= Löggulíf =

1985 Icelandic film by Þráinn Bertelsson

- Directed by: Þráinn Bertelsson
- Written by: Þráinn Bertelsson; Ari Kristinsson
- Produced by: Þráinn Bertelsson
- Starring: Eggert Þorleifsson; Karl Ágúst Úlfsson; Lilja Þórisdóttir
- Music by: Guðmundur Ingólfsson; Lárus Grímsson
- Distributed by: Nýtt Líf ehf.
- Release date: 21 December 1985
- Running time: 91 minutes
- Country: Iceland
- Language: Icelandic

Löggulíf (English: A Policeman's Life) is an Icelandic comedy film released in 1985, directed by Þráinn Bertelsson and stars Eggert Þorleifsson and Karl Ágúst Úlfsson. It is the last film in the Líf trilogy and a sequel to Nýtt líf and Dalalíf.

== Synopsis ==
Con artists Þór and Danni operate a pet services where they attempt to sell international falcon smuggler chickens disguised as falcons. After a series of coincidences, the duo ends up being enlisted into the Icelandic Police, much to the displeasure of the police chief, who is forced to set them loose on the streets without any training or preparation. There, they manage to get themselves into an incredible amount of trouble and need to deal with, among other things, a gang of elderly women, a high-speed chase through the city, and a drunk at Arnarhóll.

== Cast ==
- Karl Ágúst Úlfsson as Daníel 'Danni' Ólafsson
- Eggert Þorleifsson as Þór Magnússon
- Lilja Þórisdóttir as Sóley
- Sigurður Sigurjónsson as Kormákur 'Koggi' Reynis
- Flosi Ólafsson as Inspector Þorvarður
- Guðrún Þ. Stephensen as Laufey
- Sigurveig Jónsdóttir as Hlín
- Þórhallur Sigurðsson as Hilmar vatnsveitumaður
- Rúrik Haraldsson as Minister of Justice
- Bríet Héðinsdóttir as Minister's wife

== Production ==
The film was one of the first Icelandic films to extensively use stunt men.
