= Snævar Sölvi Sölvason =

Icelandic film director and screenwriter

- Born: 26 June 1985 (age 41)
- Education: Icelandic Film School
- Occupations: Film director Screenwriter
- Years active: 2011–present

Snævar Sölvi Sölvason (born 26 July 1985) is an Icelandic film director and screenwriter. Since 2011 he has directed three films, including the 2019 drama Eden.

== Biography ==
Snævar was raised in Bolungarvík, Iceland. He studied Financial engineering at Háskóli Íslands, where he graduated in 2010. Shortly later he wrote and directed the feature film Slay Masters which was based on his own experience from the Icelandic fishing industry. In 2012, Snævar abandoned his career in the financial industry and joined The Icelandic Film School. In 2013 he wrote and directed the comedy Albatross, starring Hansel Eagle and Pálmi Gestsson, which premiered in 2015. In 2019, he wrote and directed the drama Eden.

In 2023, he was working on the feature film Odd Fish (Icelandic: Ljósvíkingar), starring Björn Jörundur Friðbjörnsson, Arna Magnea Danks, Helgi Björnsson, Vigdís Hafliðadóttir and Pálmi Gestsson. The film premiered in September 2024.

In 2023, he directed Skaginn, a documentary series about the men's football team of Íþróttabandalag Akraness that won five national championships on a row between 1992 and 1996. In February 2024, the show was awarded the Media Award by the Football Association of Iceland.

== Filmography ==
=== Films ===
- Slay Masters (2011)
- Albatross (2015)
- Eden (2019)
- Odd Fish (2024)

=== TV shows ===
- Skaginn (2023)
