= Eggert Þorleifsson =

Icelandic actor (born 1952)

- Born: 18 July 1952 (age 72); Reykjavík, Iceland
- Occupation: Actor
- Years active: 1982–present
- Relatives: Þórhildur Þorleifsdóttir (sister)

Eggert Þorleifsson (born 18 July 1952) is an Icelandic stage and film actor. He is best known for his acting in the Líf trilogy and Með allt á hreinu.

== Personal life ==
Eggert is the younger brother of director and politician Þórhildur Þorleifsdóttir.

== Selected filmography ==
- Með allt á hreinu (1982) - Dúddi
- Nýtt Líf (1983) - Þór Magnússon
- Dalalíf (1984) - Þór Magnússon
- Skammdegi (1985) - Einar
- Löggulíf (1985) - Þór Magnússon
- Stella í orlofi (1986) - Ágúst Læjónsmaður
- Sódóma Reykjavík (1992) - Aggi Flinki
- Stuttur Frakki (1993) - Egill
- Fíaskó (2000) - Samúel
- Villiljós (2001) - Albert
- Í takt við tímann (2004) - Dúddi
- Stóra planið (2008) - Haraldur
- Kurteist fólk (2011) - Markell
- Gullregn (2020) - Anton
