= Örn Árnason =

Icelandic actor, comedian and screenwriter

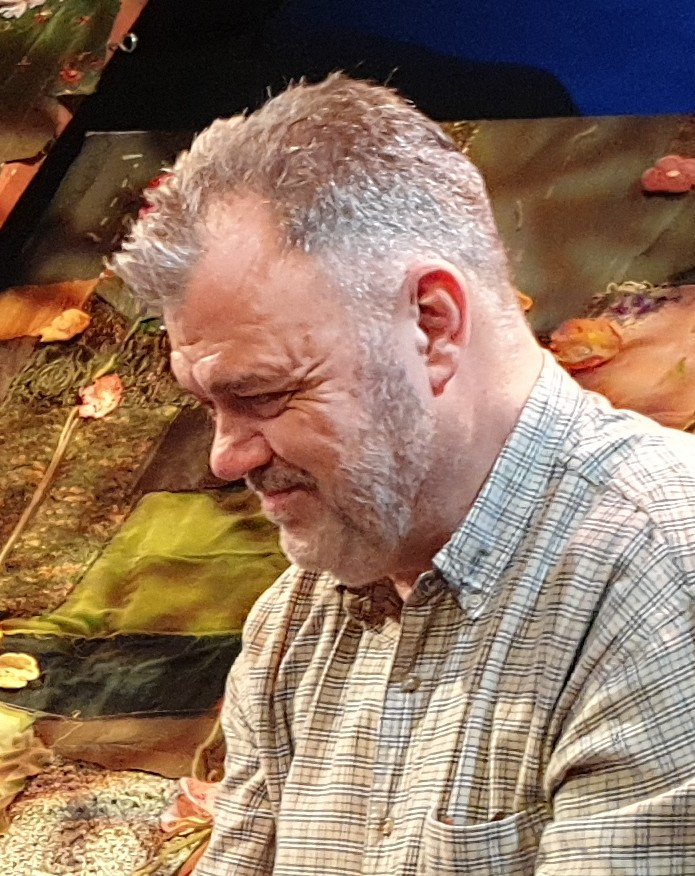
- Örn in 2025
- Born: 19 June 1959 (age 66); Reykjavík, Iceland
- Occupation: Actor
- Television: Spaugstofan

Örn Árnason (born 19 June 1959) is an Icelandic actor, comedian and screenwriter, best known as a member of the comedy group Spaugstofan. He has starred in a number of films and television series since the 1980s, as well as acting in the National Theatre of Iceland. He is noted for his satirical portrayals of public figures, including former Icelandic Prime Minister Davíð Oddsson. Örn hosted the children's morning program Með Afa on Stöð 2. He is the son of actor Árni Tryggvason.

Örn has dubbed many characters into Icelandic, in films and TV shows such as Homer Simpsons in The Simpsons, Iago in the Aladdin films and tv-series, the Owl in the Winnie the Pooh franchise and Bromley in The Swan Princess movies.

== Selected filmography ==
- Bjarnfreðarson (2009)
- LazyTown (2007)
- Stella í framboði (2002)
- Stikkfrí (1997)
- Stuttur frakki (1993)
- Karlakórinn Hekla (1992)
- Magnús (1989)
- Stella í orlofi (1986)
