= Spaugstofan =

Icelandic comedy group

- Formation: 1985
- Type: Theatre group
- Purpose: Comedy
- Location: Reykjavík, Iceland
- Members: Karl Ágúst Úlfsson; Örn Árnason; Sigurður Sigurjónsson; Pálmi Gestsson; Randver Þorláksson (1985-2007)

Spaugstofan is an Icelandic comedy group, formed in 1985, best known for their namesake weekly Saturday night sketch comedy show that has been broadcast, with breaks, and under various names, on the public television channel Sjónvarpið, and later on Stöð 2, from 1989 to 2014.

The show is the highest rated regular program on Icelandic television. Generally, the sketches satirize public events of the past week, or the exploits of recurring characters in the show.

Spaugstofan's current lineup consists of actors Örn Árnason, Karl Ágúst Úlfsson, Pálmi Gestsson and Sigurður Sigurjónsson. Randver Þorláksson was a part of the original cast but left before the 2007–2008 season. Before Randver left, the lineup had remained more or less unchanged since the group was formed. Randver's leaving the program proved very controversial in Iceland, especially as he made it clear he was not resigning of his own will, and no reason was publicly given for his departure, other than that it would make room for new guest actors in each episode..

The comedian Laddi starred with the group in its earliest years.
