= Northern Comfort (2023 film) =

Film by Hafsteinn Gunnar Sigurðsson

- Release poster
- Directed by: Hafsteinn Gunnar Sigurðsson
- Written by: Hafsteinn Gunnar Sigurðsson; Halldór Laxness Halldórsson; Tobias Munthe
- Produced by: Grimar Jonsson
- Starring: Timothy Spall; Lydia Leonard
- Cinematography: Niels Thastrum
- Edited by: Kristján Loðmfjörð
- Music by: Daníel Bjarnason
- Production companies: Netop Films; Good Chaos; One Two Films
- Distributed by: Netflix (United Kingdom)
- Release dates: 12 March 2023 (SXSW); 12 February 2024 (United Kingdom)
- Running time: 97 minutes
- Countries: Iceland; Germany; United Kingdom
- Language: English

Northern Comfort (also released as Zone(s) de Turbulence) is a 2023 comedy film directed by Hafsteinn Gunnar Sigurðsson in his English language debut. Co-written by the director with Halldór Laxness Halldórsson and Tobias Munthe, the film stars Timothy Spall and Lydia Leonard. It had its world premiere at South by Southwest in March 2023.

== Premise ==
A group of people, all suffering from fear of flying, are attending a course meant to deal with this fear. The final step of the course involves going on a "test" flight and they are left stranded in Iceland after a turbulent flight there (possibly also because of a partial engine failure on their airplane). The return flight has initially nine hours delay, so they are sent to stay in a luxurious hotel, with its own spa. With a massive storm approaching, which might cancel all flights out of Iceland, the course-takers are each trying their best to deal with their own demons.

== Cast ==
- Timothy Spall as Edward
- Lydia Leonard as Sarah
- Ella Rumpf as Coco
- Sverrir Gudnason as Alphons
- Simon Manyonda as Charles
- Björn Hlynur Haraldsson as Dries
- Rob Delaney as Ralph
- Emun Elliott as Tom
- Gina Bramhill as Liz

== Production ==
Sigurdsson told Deadline Hollywood that he was inspired to write the film about participants on a fear of flying course after he "heard about these courses because there was someone close to me that had this problem. I found it quite fascinating and wanted to use it as a vehicle or metaphor to make a film kind of an existential comedy about big themes, like fear and death and life". Sigurdsson wrote the screenplay with Halldor Laxness Halldorsson and Tobias Munthe. Producers are Grimar Jonsson via Netop Films, with Mike Goodridge of Good Chaos and Sol Bondy and Fred Burle of One Two Films as co-producers. Principal photography took place from January to March 2022. Filming locations included Mývatn, Reykjavík, the United Kingdom and France.

== Release ==
Charades handled world sales with Film4 taking the United Kingdom free TV rights, and Scanbox having pre-bought Nordic rights. Northern Comfort had its premiere at 2023 South by Southwest Film & TV Festival in Austin, Texas on 12 March 2023. The film will be available on Scanbox in Scandinavia, Weltkino in Germany and Netflix in the United Kingdom on 12 February 2024.

== Reception ==
The film received mixed reviews. On the review aggregator website Rotten Tomatoes, 20% of 5 critics' reviews are positive. Alissa Simon of Variety wrote that "Sigurðsson shows that he has the chops to work internationally should he choose to", and praised cinematographer Niels Thastum's use of “tight framing to up the claustrophobia quotient of the film's many enclosed spaces" that "should look fine on screens both big and small", adding that composer Daníel Bjarnason's "peppy score captures the characters' tension and fears". However, Brian Tallerico on rogerebert.com described the film as "a sequence of bad filmmaking decisions, amplifying characters who never once felt like they exist in the real world".
