= Under the Glacier =

1989 film

- Directed by: Guðný Halldórsdóttir
- Written by: Halldór Laxness
- Starring: Sigurður Sigurjónsson
- Release date: 25 February 1989
- Running time: 89 minutes
- Country: Iceland
- Language: Icelandic

Under the Glacier (Icelandic: Kristnihald undir Jökli) is a 1989 Icelandic drama film directed by Guðný Halldórsdóttir, based on her father Halldór Laxness's novel. The film was selected as the Icelandic entry for the Best Foreign Language Film at the 62nd Academy Awards, but was not accepted as a nominee.

== Cast ==
- Sigurður Sigurjónsson as Umbi
- Baldvin Halldórsson as Séra Jón Prímus
- Margrét Helga Jóhannsdóttir as Úa
- Kristbjörg Kjeld as Hnallflóra
- Helgi Skúlason as Godman Sý ngmann
- Þórhallur Sigurðsson as Jódínus Álfberg
- Rúrik Haraldsson as Tumi Jónsen
- Ívar DeCarsta Webster as James Butler

== See also ==
- List of submissions to the 62nd Academy Awards for Best Foreign Language Film
- List of Icelandic submissions for the Academy Award for Best Foreign Language Film
