= Magnús (film) =

1989 Icelandic film by Þráinn Bertelsson

- Directed by: Þráinn Bertelsson
- Starring: Egill Ólafsson; Laddi; Guðrún Gísladóttir
- Release date: 1989
- Running time: 90 minutes
- Country: Iceland
- Language: Icelandic

Magnús is a 1989 Icelandic film directed by Þráinn Bertelsson.

== Cast ==
- Egill Ólafsson - Magnús Bertelsson
- Laddi - Theódór Ólafsson
- Guðrún Gísladóttir - Helena Ólafsdóttir
- Jón Sigurbjörnsson - Ólafur Theódórsson
- Margrét Ákadóttir - Laufey Hrímfjörð
- María Ellingsen - Edda Magnúsdóttir
