= Albatross (2015 film) =

2015 film by Snævar Sölvi Sölvason

- Directed by: Snævar Sölvi Sölvason
- Written by: Snævar Sölvi Sölvason
- Produced by: Guðgeir Arngrímsson
- Starring: Hansel Eagle; Pálmi Gestsson; Finnbogi D. Sigurðsson; Gunnar Kristinsson
- Cinematography: Logi Ingimarsson
- Edited by: Logi Ingimarsson
- Music by: Halldór Gunnar Pálsson
- Release date: 18 June 2015
- Running time: 89 minutes
- Country: Iceland
- Languages: Icelandic; English; Portuguese; Spanish

Albatross is a 2015 Icelandic comedy drama film directed and written by Snævar Sölvi Sölvason. It stars Hansel Eagle as a young man who follows his girlfriend up to the Westfjords for a summer, prior to beginning a university course he’s not passionate about, and soon finds himself dumped and directionless. The film premiered on 18 June 2015.

The film was funded independently, with its post production financing coming through the Karolina Fund crowdfunding site.

== Cast ==
- Hansel Eagle as Tommi
- Pálmi Gestsson as Kjartan
- Finnbogi Dagur Sigurðsson as Finni
- Gunnar Kristinsson as Kiddi
- Birna Hjaltalín Pálmadóttir as Rakel
- Ársæll Níelsson as Þröstur Örn
- Guðmundur Kristjánsson as Þrándur
- Gabriela Vieira as Maria

== Plot ==
Tommi starts a summer job at a golf course in the Westfjords. The other two workers Kiddi and Finni are slackers. His girlfriend Rakel dumps him shortly after. The boss is worried about a visit from a major club and that the course is too easy so asks for obstructions to be added to some holes. The golf association tries out the course but does not like the new obstacles. They also have conflict with a conservationist because terns have occupied the driving range. The boss demand they mow the range at night, so the conservationist can't stop them. However, he is there in the evening and ends up in a fist fight with Finni. The boss also told the boys to use too much fertilizer, which backfires as the visiting golf players are not impressed with the greens. That night they go to a bar and Tommi discovers that Rakel is dating a woman football player. Tommi, Kiddi and Finni move the bird nests, so the driving range can be fixed up. The delegate from the golf association returns is satisfied how the course has been improved and they are awarded hosting a tournament.
