= María Guðmundsdóttir (actress) =

Icelandic actress (1935–2021)

- Born: 9 November 1935; Reykjavík, Iceland
- Died: 14 December 2021 (aged 86); Reykjavík, Iceland
- Occupation: Actress
- Years active: 1995–2021

María Guðmundsdóttir (9 November 1935 – 14 December 2021) was an Icelandic actress.

She started acting at the age of 60 and was known for Áramótaskaupið, Steypustöðin, Ungfrúin góða og húsið, Næturvaktin, Steindinn okkar, Stella í framboði and Perlur og Svín.

== Filmography ==
- Pearls and Swine (1997)
- Ungfrúin góða og húsið (1999)
- Stella í framboði (2002)
- Heiðin (2008)
- Dead Snow 2: Red vs. Dead (2014)

== Television ==
- Konfekt (2001)
- Steindinn okkar (2010–2012)
- Næturvaktin (2011)
- Steypustöðin (2017–2018)
- Áramótaskaupið (2019)
