= Dalalíf =

1984 Icelandic film by Þráinn Bertelsson

- Directed by: Þráinn Bertelsson
- Written by: Þráinn Bertelsson; Ari Kristinsson
- Produced by: Jón Hermannsson
- Starring: Eggert Þorleifsson; Karl Ágúst Úlfsson; Hrafnhildur Valbjörnsdóttir
- Music by: Karl Sighvatsson
- Distributed by: Nýtt Líf ehf.
- Release date: 30 September 1984
- Running time: 83 minutes
- Country: Iceland
- Language: Icelandic

Dalalíf (English: Pastoral Life) is an Icelandic comedy film released in 1984, directed by Þráinn Bertelsson and stars Eggert Þorleifsson and Karl Ágúst Úlfsson. It is the second film in the Líf trilogy and a sequel to Nýtt líf.

== Synopsis ==
Con artists Þór and Danni present themselves as experts on agriculture and hoax an unfortunate farmer into trusting them with his animals while going abroad. Obviously, he shouldn't have. When they have managed to get the "hold" of things they get the brilliant idea to have an agricultural seminar for city people on the farm.

== Cast ==
- Karl Ágúst Úlfsson as Daníel 'Danni' Ólafsson
- Eggert Þorleifsson as Þór Magnússon
- Hrafnhildur Valbjörnsdottir as Katrín
- Sigurður Sigurjónsson as JP
- Marentza Poulsen as Marit
