= Björgvin Franz Gíslason =

Icelandic actor, entertainer and children's television host

Björgvin Franz Gíslason (born 9 December 1977) is an Icelandic actor, entertainer and children's television host.

== Early life ==
Björgvin was born in Reykjavík, Iceland in 1977 to parents, actors Edda Björgvinsdóttir and Gísli Rúnar Jónsson.

== Career ==
In the late 2000s, Björgvin got the job as the children's presenter at Stundin okkar. Stundin okkar (English: Our moment) is one of the longest-running television programs in Icelandic television history. It has run at 6 PM on RÚV Sunday nights every year since Christmas 1966. In addition to hosting the show, Björgvin also published adventure books for children with themes related to the children's show. Björgvin wrote the first episodes with his mother Edda and said it was the most fun job in the world, but in 2011 he felt that it was his time to pass the torch. By that time Björgvin had won an Edda award for best children's television program.

He quit his job as TV-presenter in 2011 to move to America where his wife was studying in Wisconsin.

In 2010, he co-starred in Buddy Holly: the musical alongside 3 other actors former Stundin Okkar hosts: Gunnar Helgason, Felix Bergsson and Jóhann G. Jóhannson.

In 2016, he co-starred in his mother's one-woman show Eddan, as the long-lost son just returned from America. The show was based on his mother's life and career.

In 2022, he appeared as Hemmi Gunn in the Icelandic mini-series Blackport.

== Personal life ==
Björgvin is married to Berglind Ólafsdóttir, a marriage counselor. They started dating in 2000 and got married in 2009. They have two daughters.

Björgvin has been a fan of The Doors since he was 13 years old and fronted a tribute band at the group's event in Reykjavík in 2004.

== Filmography ==
Year	Title	Role	Notes
1986	Stella í orlofi	Sveitabörn	
2000	The Icelandic Dream	Johnny Norway	
2006	Flags of Our Fathers	Impaled Marine	

== See also ==
- List of Icelandic writers
