= María Guðmundsdóttir =

María Guðmundsdóttir may refer to:

- María Guðmundsdóttir (skier)
- María Guðmundsdóttir (filmmaker)
- María Guðmundsdóttir (actress)
