= List of shipwrecks in April 1877 =

The list of shipwrecks in April 1877 includes ships sunk, foundered, grounded, or otherwise lost during April 1877.

== 1 April ==
List of shipwrecks: 1 April 1877
Ship	State	Description
Benjamin Whitworth	United Kingdom	The steamship was run into by HMS Triumph (Royal Navy) and was severely damaged. Benjamin Whitworth was on a voyage from South Shields, County Durham to Genoa, Italy. She put in to Plymouth, Devon.
Fannie	United States	The barque was driven ashore and wrecked at Lemvig, Denmark. Her crew were rescued. She was on a voyage from New York to Kronstadt, Russia.
Isla de Cuba	Spain	The steamship was driven ashore and wrecked at Suances. All on board were rescued. She was on a voyage from Havana, Cuba to Santander.
Theresa	New Zealand	The 36-ton schooner was wrecked in Cloudy Bay.
Thistle	United Kingdom	The steamship ran aground at Newton-by-the-Sea, Northumberland. Her crew were rescued. She was on a voyage from Middlesbrough, Yorkshire to Grangemouth, Stirlingshire. She broke in two later that day and sank the next day.

== 2 April ==
List of shipwrecks: 2 April 1877
Ship	State	Description
Frank Jones	United States	The barque was driven ashore and wrecked at "Fort Strong". She was on a voyage from San Francisco, California to Manila, Spanish East Indies.
Maria José	Portugal	The ship was driven ashore at Punta Caretta, Uruguay. She was on a voyage from Pernambuco, Brazil to Montevideo, Uruguay.
Sunny Region	Canada	The barque was driven ashore and wrecked on Little Spoon Island, near Isle au Haut, Maine, United States. Her twelve crew survived; they were rescued on 6 April by the schooner Accumulation (United States). She was on a voyage from Liverpool, Lancashire, United Kingdom to Saint John, New Brunswick.

== 3 April ==
List of shipwrecks: 3 April 1877
Ship	State	Description
Bonnie Lass	New Zealand	The 39-ton schooner departed from Lyttelton Harbour for Hokitika. No further trace, presumed foundered with the loss of all four crew.
City of Berlin	United Kingdom	The ship caught fire at Trincomalee, Ceylon.
Familiens Haab	Denmark	The ship was wreclded at Thisted. Her crew were rescued. She was on a voyage from Thisted to Wilhelmshaven, Germany.
Hendrika	Netherlands	The ship was driven ashore and wrecked at Lemvig, Denmark. She was on a voyage from South Shields, County Durham to Randers, Denmark.
Monkchester	United Kingdom	The ship departed from Brisbane, South Australia for Newcastle, New South Wales or Hong Kong, China, or San Francisco, California, United States. No further trace, presumed foundered with the loss of all nineteen crew.
Roxana	United Kingdom	The barque was driven ashore and wrecked at Thisted with the loss of four of her eight crew. She was on a voyage from Blyth, Northumberland to Danzig, Germany.
Souvenir	United Kingdom	The ship ran aground at Diamond Island, Burma. She was refloated and found to be leaky.
Tagus	United Kingdom	The steamship departed from Porto, Portugal for Liverpool, Lancashire. Presumed foundered with the loss of all 27 people on board. Dead cattle that were thought to have been part of her cargo washed up at Cape Finisterre, Spain and on the coast of the Bay of Biscay.
Undine	United Kingdom	The steamship was driven ashore in the River Nene downstream of Sutton Bridge, Lincolnshire. She was on a voyage from Wisbech, Cambridgeshire to Hartlepool, County Durham.
Zelie	France	The schooner was run into by the steamship Wyvern (United Kingdom) and sank in the North Sea 3 nautical miles (5.6 km) east by north half north of the Happisburgh Lighthouse, Norfolk, United Kingdom. Her crew were rescued by Wyvern.

== 4 April ==
List of shipwrecks: 4 April 1877
Ship	State	Description
Alibi	United Kingdom	The brig was driven ashore and wrecked near Freswick, Caithness. Her crew were rescued.
Amelia C.	Italy	The barque was wrecked at Cudillero, Spain. Her crew were rescued. She was on a voyage from Newcastle upon Tyne, Northumberland, United Kingdom to Venice.
Ann and Sarah	United Kingdom	The schooner was driven into Ryde Pier, Isle of Wight and was damaged.
Avon Eaton	United Kingdom	The brig was wrecked near "Leinster". She was on a voyage from Blyth, Northumberland to "Rousby", Sweden.
Chimborazo	United Kingdom	The brig was abandoned in the Atlantic Ocean (45°54′N 28°16′W). Her nine crew were rescued by Warwick Castle (United Kingdom). Chimborazo was on a voyage from the Rio de la Hacha to Queenstown, County Cork or Falmouth, Cornwall.
Foyle	United Kingdom	The steamship was driven ashore 4 nautical miles (7.4 km) south of Maryport, Cumberland. She was on a voyage from Maryport to Swansea, Glamorgan. She was later refloated and taken in to Belfast, County Antrim, where she was repaired.
Henriette	Germany	The ship was driven ashore at Hela. She was on a voyage from Bremen to Königsberg.
Mellegdan	United Kingdom	The brig ran aground at Scotstoun Head, Aberdeenshire. She floated off and sank. Her five crew were rescued by a fishing boat. She was on a voyage from Burghead, Moray to Sunderland, County Durham.
Sumus	United Kingdom	The steamship ran aground on the Longnose Rock, Margate, Kent. She was on a voyage from Newcastle upon Tyne to Calais, France.
Terra Nova	Norway	The barque was abandoned in the Atlantic Ocean. Her crew were rescued by the barque Bondeveren (Norway). Terra Nova was on a voyage from New York, United States to Bristol, Gloucestershire, United Kingdom.

== 5 April ==
List of shipwrecks: 5 April 1877
Ship	State	Description
Aaron Eaton	United Kingdom	The brig was driven ashore near Farsund, Norway. Her crew were rescued. She was on a voyage from Blyth, Northumberland to Ronneby, Sweden.
Amykos	Sweden	The ship was driven ashore at "Hernas", near Grimstad, Norway. She was on a voyage from South Shields, County Durham to Stockholm.
Brothers	United Kingdom	The schooner was driven ashore and wrecked at St Combs, Aberdeenshire. Her crew were rescued. She was on a voyage from Middlesbrough, Yorkshire to Macduff, Aberdeenshire.
Elvira	United Kingdom	The brig was driven ashore on Samsø, Denmark. She was on a voyage from Newcastle upon Tyne, Northumberland to Korsør, Denmark. She was refloated and taken in to Aarhus, Denmark in a leaky condition.
Giulia Ravenna	Italy	The barque was driven ashore at the mouth of the River Wear. Her crew were rescued by rocket apparatus.
Iris	Canada	The ship was abandoned in the Atlantic Ocean. She was discovered off Bermuda in early July and beached.
Janet Hay	United Kingdom	The fishing boat was driven ashore 2 nautical miles (3.7 km) north of Rattray Head, Aberdeenshire. Her crew were rescued.
King Arthur	United Kingdom	The steamship ran aground at Cardiff, Glamorgan. She was on a voyage from Cardiff to Malta.
Sophia Jonkin	United Kingdom	The ship ran aground at Dundee, Forfarshire. She was on a voyage from Calcutta, India to Dundee. She was refloated and taken in to Dundee.
Unnamed	United Kingdom	The fishing boat was wrecked at Banff, Aberdeenshire with the loss of six of the nine people on board.

== 6 April ==
List of shipwrecks: 6 April 1877
Ship	State	Description
Duke of Connaught	United Kingdom	The paddle steamer ran aground at Belfast, County Antrim. She was on a voyage from Fleetwood, Lancashire to Belfast. She was refloated.
Electric	United Kingdom	The steamship ran aground at Belfast. Her passengers were taken off by the tug Shamrock (United Kingdom). Electric was on a voyage from Liverpool, Lancashire to Belfast.
Emilio	Italy	The ship departed from Baltimore, Maryland, United States for Drogheda, County Louth, United Kingdom. No further trace, reported missing.
Hannah Parr	Norway	The barque was wrecked on Sanday, Orkney Islands, United Kingdom. Her seventeen crew survived. She was on a voyage from Hull, Yorkshire, United Kingdom to Quebec City, Canada.
Jane Gwynne	United Kingdom	The schooner was driven ashore by a freshet at Aberdeen. Her four crew were rescued by the Aberdeen Lifeboat. She was on a voyage from Barmouth, Merionethshire to Aberdeen.
Ploughman	United Kingdom	The brig was driven ashore by a freshet at Aberdeen. Her eight crew were rescued by tha Aberdeen Lifeboat. Ploughmam was on a voyage from Sunderland, County Durham to Aberdeen. She was refloated on 8 April and towed in to Aberdeen.

== 7 April ==
List of shipwrecks: 7 April 1877
Ship	State	Description
Arcania	United Kingdom	The ship was driven ashore and wrecked at Seaham, County Durham. Her crew were rescued.
Cheviot	United Kingdom	The ship was wrecked east of Sutton-on-Sea, Lincolnshire.
Edward	New Zealand	The 36-ton schooner was sighted whild on a voyage from Lyttelton Harbour to Le Bon's Bay. No further trace, presumed foundered with the loss of all four crew.

== 8 April ==
List of shipwrecks: 8 April 1877
Ship	State	Description
Magnet	United Kingdom	The steamship ran aground at Liverpool, Lancashire. She was on a voyage from Belfast, County Antrim to Liverpool.
North Wind	United Kingdom	The barque was driven ashore at Pensacola, Florida, United States. She was on a voyage from Bristol, Gloucestershire to Pensacola. She was refloated.

== 9 April ==
List of shipwrecks: 9 April 1877
Ship	State	Description
Boaz	United Kingdom	The smack sank off Roddens Head, County Down with the loss of five lives. She was on a voyage from Glasgow, Renfrewshire to Dundalk, County Louth.
Britannia	United Kingdom	The tug suffered a boiler explosion and sank off the mouth of the River Rhymney with the loss of two of her crew. Survivors were rescued by a tug. She was towing the schooner Ocean (United Kingdom) from Penzance, Cornwall to Cardiff, Glamorgan.
Najaden	Norway	The ship was abandoned in the North Sea. Her crew were rescued by the steamship Samson (United Kingdom). Najaden was son a voyage from Fredrikstad to Grimsby, Lincolnshire, United Kingdom.
St. Keverne	United Kingdom	The ship ran aground in Port Hallowa Cove, Cornwall. She was refloated and towed in to Falmouth, Cornwall in a leaky condition.

== 10 April ==
List of shipwrecks: 10 April 1877
Ship	State	Description
George	United Kingdom	The Mersey Flat collided with the steamship Shandon (United Kingdom) and sank at Liverpool, Lancashire. Her crew survived.
Julianne	Germany	The ship was driven ashore at Fredrikstad, Norway. She was on a voyage from Memel to Itzehoe. She was later refloated and taken in to Fredrikstad.

== 12 April ==
List of shipwrecks: 12 April 1877
Ship	State	Description
Juliette	France	The brig was driven ashore and damaged at Tavira, Portugal. She was on a voyage from Huelva, Spain to Caen, Calvados. She was declared a total loss.

== 13 April ==
List of shipwrecks: 13 April 1877
Ship	State	Description
Etna	United Kingdom	The steamship ran aground at Ochachiv, Russia. She was on a voyage from Nicholaieff, Russia to Hartlepool, County Durham. She was refloated and taken in to Odesa, Russia to repair a leak.
Frank and Emily	United Kingdom	The barque foundered off the coast of North Carolina, United States with the loss of all but her captain. She was on a voyage from Rockport, Maine to Liverpool, Lancashire.
Leo	United States	The steamship was destroyed by fire at sea with the loss of eighteen lives. Three people were reported missing. She was on a voyage from Savannah, Georgia to Nassau, Bahamas.
Louise	United Kingdom	The steamship ran aground in the Danube downstream of Sulina, Ottoman Empire. She was later refloated.

== 14 April ==
List of shipwrecks: 14 April 1877
Ship	State	Description
Dana	United Kingdom	The steamship ran aground on the Svino Reef, off Kalmar, Sweden. She was later refloated and taken in to Oscarshamn, Sweden.
Duchess	United Kingdom	The steamship ran aground and sank in Morecambe Bay. Her crew were rescued by the schooner Jane (United Kingdom). Duchess was on a voyage from Ardrossan, Ayrshire to Morecambe Bay. She was later refloated and towed in to Fleetwood, Lancashire.
Favourite	United Kingdom	The ship was wrecked at Lerwick, Shetland Islands. Her crew were rescued.
Gazelle	United Kingdom	The barque was abandoned in the Atlantic Ocean, in position 35°22′N 73°44′W, about 120 nautical miles (220 km) east of Cape Hatteras, United States, when sinking from heavy gale damage, on a voyage from Trinidad de Cuba, Cuba to the Delaware Breakwater, United States. Her crew were rescued by the barque Perseverante (Italy).
George Brown	United Kingdom	The schooner was driven ashore and wrecked at Montrose, Forfarshire with the loss of three of her five crew. Both of the Montrose Lifeboats attended and rescued the survivors. She was on a voyage from Newcastle upon Tyne, Northumberland to Montrose.
Inch Moan	United Kingdom	The ship was wrecked at San Antonio, Chile. Her crew were rescued.
Killarney, and Sea Gull	United Kingdom	The steamships collided at Vlissingen, Zeeland, Netherlands and were both severely damaged. Killarney was on a voyage from Goole, Yorkshire to Terneuzen, Zeeland. Sea Gull was on a voyage from Akyab, Burma to Antwerp, Belgium.
Peri	(United Kingdom of Great Britain and Ireland) Jersey	The ship departed from Plymouth, Devon for Jersey. No further trace, reported missing, presumed foundered, or to have been run down and sunk with the loss of all on board.
Rotterdam	Netherlands	The steamship ran aground at Hoek van Holland, South Holland. She was on a voyage from New York, United States to Rotterdam, South Holland. She was refloated and completed her voyage.
Solo	United Kingdom	The barque ran aground 8 nautical miles (15 km) north of Tynemouth, Northumberland. She was on a voyage from Kristiansand, Norway to Sunderland, County Durham. She was refloated and completed her voyage.
Telessie	United Kingdom	The brig ran aground on the Maplin Sand, in the North Sea off the coast of Essex. She was on a voyage from Guernsey, Channel Islands to London. She was refloated with assistance and resumed her voyage.
Two Sisters	United Kingdom	The brig ran aground on the Maplin Sand. She was on a voyage from Guernsey to London. She was refloated with assistance and resumed her voyage.
Victoria	United Kingdom	The barque was driven ashore and wrecked at Sunderland. Her nine crew were rescued by the Sunderland Lifeboat John Foulston ( Royal National Lifeboat Institution). Victoria was on a voyage from Sunderland to Stockholm, Sweden.

== 15 April ==
List of shipwrecks: 15 April 1877
Ship	State	Description
Echo	United Kingdom	The tug collided with the steamship Concordia (United Kingdom) and sank in the River Thames at Horsleydown, Surrey.
Erndtt, or Ernette	Germany	The schooner ran aground on The Shingle and was abandoned. Her crew were rescued by the barque Golden Russett (United Kingdom). Erndtt was on a voyage from Hamburg to Dunkirk, Nord, France.
Mystery	United Kingdom	The smack sank at Mevagissey, Cornwall. She was later refloated.
St. Andrew	United Kingdom	The schooner was driven ashore and sank at St. Catherine's Point, Cornwall. Her five crew were rescued. She was on a voyage from Porthcawl, Glamorgan to Par, Cornwall.
White Rose	United Kingdom	The fishing trawler ran aground at Gorleston, Suffolk. She was refloated with assistance from the Gorleston Lifeboat Leicester ( Royal National Lifeboat Institution) and towed in to Great Yarmouth, Norfolk by a tug.
Zenobia	United Kingdom	The ship was wrecked in the Magdalen Islands, Nova Scotia, Canada. Her crew were rescued.

== 16 April ==
List of shipwrecks: 16 April 1877
Ship	State	Description
Andromeda	United Kingdom	The schooner was driven ashore at Dundalk, County Louth. All on board were rescued by the Blackrock Lifeboat Stodsport Sunday School ( Royal National Lifeboat Institution). Jane was on a voyage from Garston, Lancashire to Dundalk.
Barmouth	United Kingdom	The smack sank of Garth Point, Anglesey.
Cotelino, and Georgina	Spain; United Kingdom	The brig Georgina ran aground and was damaged at Dover, Kent. She was refloated and put back to Dover in a severely leaky condition. She then collided with the steamship Cotelino, severely damaging that vessel.
Eidanger	Norway	The brig was driven ashore and wrecked on the North Rock, in the Belfast Lough. She was on a voyage from Liverpool, Lancashire, United Kingdom to Porsgrund.
Elizabeth	United Kingdom	The smack was lost off Cardigan. Her three crew were rescued by the Cardigan Lifeboat John Stuart ( Royal National Lifeboat Institution).
Gilston	United Kingdom	The steamship ran aground on the Potatoe Garth, in the River Wear. She was on a voyage from Dunkirk, Nord, France to Sunderland, County Durham. She was refloated and taken in to Sunderland.
Isabella Wilson, and an unnamed vessel	United Kingdom	The schooner Isabella Wilson collided with a coal hulk in the River Thames at Gravesend, Kent. Both vessels were severely damaged.
Jane	United Kingdom	The schooner was wrecked on the Cross Sand, in the North Sea off the coast of Norfolk with the loss of all hands. She was on a voyage from Antwerp, Belgium to Newcastle upon Tyne, Northumberland.
Jane	United Kingdom	The schooner was driven ashore at Dundalk. All on board were rescued by the Blackrock Lifeboat Stodsport Sunday School ( Royal National Lifeboat Institution) and a Coastguard boat. She was on a voyage from Garston to Dundalk.
Jean	United Kingdom	The brigantine was driven ashore. She was on a voyage from Newcastle upon Tyne to Harlingen, Friesland, Netherlands. She was refloated and taken in to Grimsby, Lincolnshire.
Maglona	United Kingdom	The steamship struck the pier at Sunderland and was severely damaged. She was on a voyage from Dieppe, Seine-Inférieure, France to Sunderland.
Mary Helen	United Kingdom	The schooner sprang a leak off Ceibwr Bay and was abandoned by her crew. She was on a voyage from Glasgow, Renfrewshire to Bristol, Gloucestershire. Mary Helen was taken in to Cardigan the next day by the Cardigan Lifeboat John Stuart ( Royal National Lifeboat Institution).
Mercur	Austria-Hungary	The barque was driven ashore and wrecked at Camden Fort, County Cork, United Kingdom. She was on a voyage from New York, United States to Cork.
Mutlah	United Kingdom	The barque was wrecked on the Black Water Bank, in the Irish Sea off the coast of County Wexford with the loss of thirteen of the twenty people on board. She was on a voyage from Liverpool to Bombay, India.
Prado	United Kingdom	The ship ran aground at Penarth, Glamorgan. She was refloated.
Ramonceto	Spain	The brigantine was driven ashore and wrecked at Dungeness, Kent, United Kingdom with the loss of all hands.
St. Andrews	United Kingdom	The schooner was driven ashore at Fowey, Cornwall. She was on a voyage from Porthcawl, Glamorgan to Par, Cornwall.
St. Lawrence	Norway	The barque was driven ashore and wrecked at Cushendall, County Antrim, United Kingdom.
Unnamed	United Kingdom	The fishing vessel was wrecked near Brixham, Devon. Her crew survived.

== 17 April ==
List of shipwrecks: 17 April 1877
Ship	State	Description
Ben Avon	United Kingdom	The steamship ran aground on the Blacktail Sand, in the Thames Estuary and sank. She was on a voyage from Danzig, Germany to London. She was later refloated and towed in to London.
Blanche and Maria	Norway	The barque foundered off the Leman Lightship ( Trinity House) with the loss of all hands.
City of Venice	United Kingdom	The steamship ran aground on the North Rock, in the Belfast Lough. All on board were rescued. She was on a voyage from Calcutta, India to Glasgow, Renfrewshire. She was refloated on 25 May.
Cleotha, and Rothbury	Austria-Hungary); United Kingdom	The brigantine Cleotha collided with the steamship Rothbury 30 nautical miles (56 km) south of The Lizard, Cornwall. Five of her nine crew got aboard Rothbury. She was on a voyage from Trinidad to Havre de Grâce, Seine-Inférieure, France. She was presumed to have foundered. Rothbury was on a voyage from Huelva, Spain to Hamburg, Germany. She was severely damaged and put in to Falmouth, Cornwall in a sinking condition and was beached.
Earl of Carrick	United Kingdom	The steamship was beached at Holyhead, Anglesey and was severely damaged. She was on a voyage from Newport, Monmouthshire to Workington, Cumberland. She was refloated on 1 May.
Isabella	United Kingdom	The schooner was driven ashore and wrecked at Skerries, County Dublin. Her five crew were rescued by the Skerries Lifeboat Laura Platt ( Royal National Lifeboat Institution). Isabella was on a voyage from London to Dundalk, County Louth.
Larne	United Kingdom	The steamship ran aground and sank at Larne, County Antrim. Her crew were rescued. She was on a voyage from Glasgow, Renfrewshire to Larne. Larne was refloated on 22 May.
Lord John Russell	United Kingdom	The sloop was driven ashore in Swanage Bay. Her crew survived.
Maarten van Roussen	Netherlands	The barque ran aground at Brouwershaven, Zeeland. She was on a voyage from Rotterdam, South Holland to Java, Netherlands East Indies. She was refloated with the assistance of a tug.
Meerschaum	United Kingdom	The steamship was driven ashore at the Packerort Lighthouse, Russia. She was on a voyage from Newcastle upon Tyne, Northumberland to Reval, Russia. She was later refloated.
Ocean Packet No. 3	Netherlands	The brigantine was driven ashore near Newcastle, County Down, United Kingdom. Her seven crew were rescued by the Newcastle Lifeboat. She was on a voyage from Liverpool, Lancashire, United Kingdom to Riga, Russia.
Presto	Norway	The schooner was driven ashore at Kilmichael, County Cork, United Kingdom with the loss of three of her seven crew. Survivors were rescued by the Coastguard.
Southtown	United Kingdom	The schooner was driven ashore at Greenore, County Louth.
HMS Volta	Royal Navy	The corvette sank in the River Medway at Chatham, Kent. All on board survived. She was later refloated.
Widgeon	United Kingdom	The barque was driven ashore on Kuressaare, Russia. She was on a voyage from Malmö, Sweden to Riga.
Unnamed	Flag unknown	The steamship ran aground on the Bluetail Sand, in the Thames Estuary.

== 18 April ==
List of shipwrecks: 18 April 1877
Ship	State	Description
Fortuna	Norway	The brig was driven ashore and wrecked at Hornsea, Yorkshire, United Kingdom. Her six crew were rescued by the Hornsea Lifeboat Ellen and Margaret ( Royal National Lifeboat Institution).

== 19 April ==
List of shipwrecks: 19 April 1877
Ship	State	Description
Arizona	United Kingdom	The ship collided with the steamshipSan Martin (France) and sank in the Atlantic Ocean with the loss of twelve of her crew. Survivors were rescued by San Martin. Arizona was on a voyage from Liverpool, Lancashire to Calcutta, India.
Isabella Ridley	Flag unknown	The 233-ton wooden barque was wrecked at Timaru, New Zealand when she was washed ashore by a heavy swell. A total absence of any breeze made her unmanageable and the surf pushed her onto rocks.
Paul Feschner	Flag unknown	The ship was abandoned in the Atlantic Ocean. Her crew were rescued by the barque Leo (Norway). Paul Feschner was on a voyage from Savannah, Georgia, United States to Liverpool, Lancashire, United Kingdom.
San Pedro	Spain	The steamship was driven ashore and damaged at Arzilla, Morocco. Her crew survived. She was later refloated and towed in to Cádiz, where she arrived on 12 July.
Suez	Norway	The barque was wrecked on the Scroby Sands, Norfolk, United Kingdom with the loss of one of her thirteen crew. Survivors were rescued by the Caister Lifeboat Mark Lane ( Royal National Lifeboat Institution). Suez floated off and came ashore at Great Yarmouth, Norfolk.

== 20 April ==
List of shipwrecks: 20 April 1877
Ship	State	Description
Charlotte Parsons	United Kingdom	The sailing barge was run into by the steamship Tiara (United Kingdom) and sank. Both crew survived.
Clansman	United Kingdom	The steamship ran aground at Lochaline, Argyllshire. She was refloated and resumed her voyage.

== 21 April ==
List of shipwrecks: 21 April 1877
Ship	State	Description
Albania	United Kingdom	The steamship was driven ashore at Flamborough Head, Yorkshire. Her crew were rescued.
Amphitrite	United Kingdom	The brig was driven onto the Herd Sand, in the North Sea off the coast of County Durham. She was on a voyage from Leith, Lothian to South Shields, County Durham. She was refloated the next day with the assistance of two tugs and taken in to the River Tyne.
Hope	United Kingdom	The schooner was driven ashore at Flamborough Head. Her crew were rescued. She was on a voyage from Lowestoft, suffolk to the River Tyne.
Intrepid	United Kingdom	The fishing smack was driven ashore at Scarborough, Yorkshire. She was refloated and taken in to Scaarborough.
Rapide	United Kingdom	The ship was driven ashore and wrecked north of Maceió, Brazil. She was on a voyage from a Mexican port to Liverpool, Lancashire.

== 22 April ==
List of shipwrecks: 22 April 1877
Ship	State	Description
Abana	United Kingdom	The steamship was driven ashore at Flamborough Head, Yorkshire. She was on a voyage from a French port to Sunderland, County Durham. She was refloated.
Fredericke	United Kingdom	The barque was driven ashore and wrecked in the River Tay. Her fourteen crew were rescued by the Broughty Ferry Lifeboat. She was on a voyage from South Shields, County Durham, United Kingdom to Reval, Russia.
Hope	United Kingdom	The schooner was driven ashore and wrecked at Flamborough Head. She was on a voyage from Lowestoft, Suffolk to "Hardcastle".
Margaretta Hellechina	Netherlands	The galiot sprang a leak and was beached in Mount's Bay, where she was wrecked. Her crew were rescued. She was on a voyage from Larache, Morocco to Gloucester, United Kingdom.

== 23 April ==
List of shipwrecks: 23 April 1877
Ship	State	Description
Frena	France	The brigantine was driven ashore at Tynemouth, Northumberland, United Kingdom. She was on a voyage from South Shields, County Durham to Gravelines, Nord. She was refloated with the assistance of a tug and taken in to South Shields.

== 25 April ==
List of shipwrecks: 25 April 1877
Ship	State	Description
Ceylon	United Kingdom	The barque was abandoned at sea. Her crew were rescued.
General Trebenit	France	The ship ran aground at Bordeaux, Gironde. She was on a voyage from Guadeloupe to Bordeaux. She was later refloated.
Mary Ann and Eliza	United Kingdom	The smack ran aground and sank on the Dogger Bank, in the Irish Sea off the coast of County Wexford. She was on a voyage from Plymouth, Devon to Wexford.
Rifleman	United Kingdom	The ship caught fire in the Atlantic Ocean. She was on a voyage from Demerara, British Guiana to London. She was abandoned the next day and sank the day after. Her crew took to the boats; one boat reached Saint Kitts.

== 26 April ==
List of shipwrecks: 26 April 1877
Ship	State	Description
British Queen	United Kingdom	The steamship ran aground on the Pagensand, in the North Sea off the German coast. She was on a voyage from Hamburg, Germany to Hartlepool, County Durham. She was later refloated with assistance from the steamships Enak (Germany) and Magnet (United Kingdom) and resumed her voyage.

== 28 April ==
List of shipwrecks: 28 April 1877
Ship	State	Description
Sibyl	United Kingdom	The schooner was driven ashore and wrecked near Tacumshane, County Wexford. Her crew were rescued. She was on a voyage from Plymouth, Devon to Wexford.

== 29 April ==
List of shipwrecks: 29 April 1877
Ship	State	Description
Hendon	United Kingdom	The brig sprang a leak and was abandoned in the Atlantic Ocean 10 nautical miles (19 km) east north east of the Isles of Scilly. Her crew were rescued by Jeune Henri (France). Hendon was on a voyage from Liverpool, Lancashire to Kronstadt, Russia.
Presenske	Germany	The barque sprang a leak and foundered off Málaga, Spain. Her crew were rescued by the brigantine Lund (Denmark). Presenske was on a voyage from Torrevieja Spain to Liepāja, Courland Governorate.
Sidonia	United Kingdom	The steamship was damaged by a boiler explosion at sea. Seven of her crew sustained fatal injuries and died within 24 hours. She was on a voyage from New York to Bristol, Gloucestershire.

== 30 April ==
List of shipwrecks: 30 April 1877
Ship	State	Description
Caroline	United Kingdom	The schooner struck the Longships, Cornwall and was damaged. She was on a voyage from Saint-Valery-sur-Somme, Somme, France to Runcorn, Cheshire. She was refloated and put in to Penzance, Cornwall in a severely leaky condition.
Commerzienrathin Haupt	Germany	The brig ran aground at Berwick upon Tweed, Northumberland, United Kingdom. She was on a voyage from Fernandina Beach, Florida, United States to Berwick upon Tweed.
Fidget	United Kingdom	The smack struck the pier and sank at Great Yarmouth, Norfolk.
Jane Butcher	United Kingdom	The ship was driven ashore at Salobreña, Spain. She was on a voyage from London to Motril, Spain.
Legion of Honour	United Kingdom	The ship was wrecked at Zliten, Ottoman Tripolitania. She was on a voyage from Valencia, Spain to New York, United States.
Squirrel	United Kingdom	The steamship collided with the schooner Gipsy Queen (United Kingdom) off Nash Point, Glamorgan and was abandoned. Her crew were rescued by Gipsy Queen. Squirrel was on a voyage from Newport, Monmouthshire to Hayle, Cornwall.

== Unknown date ==
List of shipwrecks: Unknown date in April 1877
Ship	State	Description
Alfera	Italy	The brig was driven ashore west of "Rognetas".
Alletta Martha	Flag unknown	The galiot collided with the schooner Victoria (Netherlands) and was abandoned at sea. Her crew were rescued.
Annie Jones	United Kingdom	The ship was abandoned at sea before 9 April.
Assecuradeur	Germany	The ship was driven ashore in the Hampton Roads, Virginia, United States. She was on a voyage from Baltimore, Maryland, United States to Hamburg.
Brilliant	United Kingdom	The brig was driven ashore at New Romney, Kent. She was refloated.
British London	United Kingdom	The ship ran aground on the North Watcher, off Batavia, Netherlands East Indies. She was refloated and resumed her voyage.
Buck	United Kingdom	The ship was wrecked at Cape Agulhas, Cape Colony. Her crew were rescued. She was on a voyage from Java, Netherlands East Indies to Falmouth, Cornwall.
Charles E. Elmir	United States	The ship ran aground and was wrecked in the Topsail Sound. She was on a voyage from Philadelphia, Pennsylvania to Havana, Cuba.
Charm	United Kingdom	The schooner was wrecked. Her three crew were rescued by a lifeboat.
Cheviot	Canada	The brig was wrecked at "Brunnor", Bahamas. Her crew were rescued. She was on a voyage from Saint John, New Brunswick to Matanzas, Cuba.
Courier de Canada	France	The brig was driven ashore at Pensacola, Florida, United States. She was later refloated.
Don Quixote	United States	The ship ran aground on the Shoebury Sand, in the Thames Estuary. She was refloated and taken in to Yantlet, Kent.
Duguy Trouin	France	The ship was driven ashore in a hurricane and was wrecked.
Echo	United Kingdom	The ship was driven ashore and wrecked on the coast of British Honduras. She was on a voyage from Saint Thomas, Virgin Islands to the Southwest Passage.
Emilie	Germany	The schooner was run down and sunk in the North Sea. Her crew were rescued. She was on a voyage from Gothenburg, Sweden to an English port.
Ernest Marie	France	The ship was wrecked at Ingólfshöfði, Iceland. Her crew were rescued.
Galathea	Norway	The barque was driven ashore at Cape Charles, Virginia, United States. She was on a voyage from Cádiz, Spain to New York, United States.
Giovanni	Italy	The schooner was driven ashore at Gibraltar. SHe was on a voyage from Hull, Yorkshire, United Kingdom to Gibraltar. She was refloated.
Girl of the Period	United Kingdom	The ship ran aground off Yarmouth, Isle of Wight. She was on a voyage from Hamburg to Curaçao, Curaçao and Dependencies. She was refloated and put in to Falmouth in a leaky condition.
Gottfried	Sweden	The brig was driven ashore at Falsterbo. She was on a voyage from Kalmar to West Hartlepool, County Durham, United Kingdom.
G. P. Pomroy	United States	The schooner was lost with all hands in a gale whilst on a voyage from Brunswick, Georgia to Bath, Maine.
Hannah Morris	Canada	The ship was driven ashore at Pensacola. She was on a voyage from Pensacola to Hull. She was later refloated and resumed her voyage.
Hartleys	United Kingdom	The ship was driven ashore near Ventava, Courland Governorate. Her crew were rescued.
Hortense	France	The ship was driven ashore in a hurricane and was wrecked.
J. B. Lincoln	United States	The ship was driven ashore at Falmouth. She was later refloated.
Jewess	United Kingdom	The schooner was driven ashore at Wexford. She was refloated on 9 April and sailed for Dublin.
Joseph Hickman	Canada	The ship was driven ashore at Saint John, New Brunswick. She was on a voyage from Dorchester, New Brunswick to Saint John. She was refloated with assistance.
Joseph Pense	United Kingdom	The steamship ran aground at Cardiff, Glamorgan. She was on a voyage from Bristol, Gloucestershire to Cardiff.
Kate Brain	New Zealand	The 118-ton brigantine departed from Timaru for Auckland in early April. No further trace, presumed foundered with the loss of all six crew.
Langet	Norway	The barque sank at Pensacola. She was later refloated.
Le Grand Gustav	Belgium	The ship was driven ashore at Lewes, Delaware, United States. She was on a voyage from London, United Kingdom to the Delaware River. She was later refloated with assistance.
Lena Thurlow	United States	The ship sprang a leak and sank in the Mannie River. She was on a voyage from Cárdenas, Cuba to Philadelphia. She was later refloated.
Lewis	United Kingdom	The steamship was abandoned at sea. Her crew were rescued.
Lewis S. Davis	United Kingdom	The steamship was abandoned at sea. Her crew were rescued.
Lily	United Kingdom	The steamship ran aground on the Potatoe Garth, in the River Wear. She was on a voyage from London to Sunderland, County Durham. She was refloated with the assistance of four steamboats.
MacLeod	United Kingdom	The ship ran aground at Saint John, New Brunswick.
Marie	Flag unknown	The ship foundered in the North Sea off the coast of Norfolk, United Kingdom.
Marie D	France	The fishing lugger was driven ashore at "Gallowhead", on the west coast of the Isle of Lewis, Outer Hebrides, United Kingdom. Her crew survived.
Marie Térèse	France	The ship was abandoned at sea with the loss of four of her twenty crew.
Mary J. Ward	United States	The ship was abandoned in the Atlantic Ocean before 20 April.
Mary Patton	United States	The schooner was abandoned in the Atlantic Ocean before 26 April.
Medea	Austria-Hungary	The barque collided with a floating log in the Atlantic Ocean and was abandoned with the loss of two lives. Survivors were rescued by the brig Star of Peace (United Kingdom). Medea was on a voyage from Trieste to Bordeaux, Gironde, France.
Melanope	United Kingdom	The ship ran aground in the Krishna River. She was on a voyage from Melbourne, Victoria to Rangoon, Burma.
Mercator	Netherlands	The ship was wrecked on the Isla de los Estados before 13 April.
Minna Helen	Germany	The brig was driven ashore at Pensacola. She was later refloated.
Narenta	Austria-Hungary	The steamship ran aground in the River Suir. She was on a voyage from Nicholaieff, Russia to Waterford, United Kingdom. She was refloated on 22 April and taken in to Waterford.
Northwood	United States	The barque ran aground at the mouth of the Potomac River and was severely damaged. She was on a voyage from Baltimore, Maryland to San Blas.
Orconera	Germany	The steamship ran aground in the Nieuwe Waterweg. She was on a voyage from Bilbao, Spain to Rotterdam, South Holland, Netherlands. She was refloated and completed her voyage.
Orpheus	Norway	The barque was driven ashore in the Hampton Roads.
Prince George	United Kingdom	The derelict cutter was towed in to the Nieuwe Diep.
Reaper	(United Kingdom of Great Britain and Ireland) Guernsey	The ship was driven ashore in Colwell Bay.
Rogina	United Kingdom	The schooner was driven ashore near Dundalk, County Louth. Her crew were rescued. She was on a voyage from Workington, Cumberland to Drogheda, County Louth.
Rowena	United Kingdom	The steamship was driven ashore in the Danube at Sulina, Ottoman Empire. She was on a voyage from Sulina to Newcastle upon Tyne, Northumberland.
Start	United Kingdom	The fishing smack was driven ashore. She was refloated and taken in to Grimsby, Lincolnshire.
Sylvia	United Kingdom	The ship was abandoned in the Atlantic Ocean. Her crew were rescued.
Thor	Netherlands	The schooner ran aground on the Maplin Sand, in the North Sea off the coast of Essex, United Kingdom. She was refloated and towed in to Gravesend, Kent.
Zelie	France	The schooner collided with the steamship Wyvern (United Kingdom) and foundered 3 nautical miles (5.6 km) east by north half north of the Happisburgh Lighthouse, Norfolk. Her crew were rescued by Wyvern.
Unnamed	France	The steamship was wrecked with the loss of all on board. She was on a voyage from Brest to Ouessant, Finistère.
Unnamed	United Kingdom	Russo-Turkish War: The steamship struck a torpedo and sank at Kertch, Russia with the loss of all hands.
