= Eden (2019 film) =

2019 film by Snævar Sölvi Sölvason

- Directed by: Snævar Sölvi Sölvason
- Written by: Snævar Sölvi Sölvason
- Produced by: Guðgeir Arngrímsson
- Starring: Telma Huld Jóhannesdóttir; Hansel Eagle; Steinunn Ólína Þorsteinsdóttir; Arnar Jónsson
- Cinematography: Logi Ingimarsson
- Edited by: Logi Ingimarsson
- Music by: Magnús Jóhann Ragnarsson
- Release date: 10 May 2019
- Running time: 85 minutes
- Country: Iceland
- Language: Icelandic

Eden is a 2019 Icelandic drama film directed and written by Snævar Sölvi Sölvason. The film stars Telma Huld Jóhannesdóttir and Hansel Eagle as a drug dealing young couple in Reykjavik who steal narcotics from an infamous drug lord to start a new life. It premiered in Iceland on 10 May 2019.

== Cast ==
- Telma Huld Jóhannesdóttir as Lóa
- Hansel Eagle as Óliver
- Arnar Jónsson as Flugan
- Steinunn Ólína Þorsteinsdóttir as Vigga's mother
- Tinna Sverrisdóttir as Vigga
- Hjalti P. Finnsson as Tumi

== Plot ==
Óli, fleeing a police raid goes to a house and finds Lóa unconscious in the bath. He revives her, but another man in house is dead from overdose. They go to the house of Lóa's friends Gunni and Ronni, who connect them with Tumi, a drug boss. They act as drug couriers for him. One day, they visit another intermediary and find her dead. They intend to take some pharmaceutical drugs there and grab a bag, which has 1 kg of cocaine and two pistols in it. They then begin selling the cocaine themselves, hoping to make enough to quit the drug dealing business. However, Tumi's father figures out what is going on and sends some thugs, who find Gunni and Ronni. Óli and Lóa escape. Lóa and Óli go to rob Tumi to get "their" money. Tumi is accidentally shot by his own father, then Lóa shoots the father. They take the safe, but find it has only childhood drawings instead of cash.
