= Þráinn Bertelsson =

Icelandic politician

- Born: 30 November 1944 (age 81)
- Occupations: Film director, writer, politician, journalist, newspaper editor

Þráinn Bertelsson (born 30 November 1944) is an Icelandic film director, writer, politician, journalist and newspaper editor. He moved into politics during the 2008–2012 Icelandic financial crisis, and was elected a member of the Althing in 2009, initially for the Citizens' Movement. He later left the party to become an independent MP, before joining the Left-Green Movement, which he currently represents.

== Film production ==
Þráinn has written, directed and produced seven feature films. His 1981 film Jón Oddur & Jón Bjarni (English title: The Twins) won a Silver Award at the 1982 Giffoni Film Festival. His 1989 film Magnús was nominated for two European Film Awards, for best picture and best script, and received the 1990 DV Cultural Prize in Iceland.

He was a co-founder of Norðan 8 and in 1982 founded his own film company, Nýtt líf (New Life Ltd.). He served a year as chairman of The Association of Icelandic Film Directors.

== Writing ==
Þráinn has written columns for Iceland's largest newspaper, Fréttablaðið, and his autobiographical Einhvers konar ég (English: Some Kind of Me) sold more than 20,000 copies in Iceland. He has also translated several of the novels of Maj Sjöwall and Per Wahlöö. In 1987–1988, Þráinn was the editor of the newspaper Þjóðviljinn, and in 1990 of the magazine Hesturinn okkar.

His 1984 book Hundrað ára afmælið won the Children's Literature Prize of the Reykjavík Board of Education.

He has also written three darkly comic crime novels: Dauðans óvissi tími (Death's Uncertain Hour, 2004), Valkyrjur (Valkyries, 2005), and Englar dauðans (Angels of Death, 2007).

From 1992 to 1994, he was chairman of The Writer's Union of Iceland.

== Politics ==
Þráinn has been a member of the Althing since 2009, initially representing the Citizens' Movement party. On 14 August 2009 he left the party, choosing to sit as an independent. He is now sitting with the Left Green Party.

== Personal ==
He is married to Sólveig Eggertsdóttir, an artist who heads a department at the Iceland Art Academy. They have two children and live in Reykjavík.

== Filmography ==
- Jón Oddur & Jón Bjarni; English title: The Twins (1981)
- Ég mundi segja hó (TV movie) (1982)
- Nýtt líf (1983)
- Dalalíf (1984)
- Skammdegi (1985)
- Löggulíf (1985)
- Magnús (1989)
- Einkalíf (1995)
- Sigla himinfley (TV miniseries) (1996)

== Bibliography ==
- Sunnudagur (Reykjavík : Helgafell, 1970)
- Stefnumót í Dublin (Reykjavík : Helgafell, 1971)
- Kópamaros : skáldsaga um óunninn sigur (Reykjavík : Helgafell, 1972)
- Paradísarvíti : endurminningarþættir sem sjálfur hefur saman skrifað greifinn Yon d'islande, fæddur Jón Dísland, Bakka (nú Sólbakka) í Eyjafjarðarsýslu, Íslandi (Reykjavík : Helgafell, 1974)
- Svartur markaður : sakamálaleikrit í 6 þáttum, with Gunnar Gunnarsson (1978)
- Hundrað ára afmælið, illustrated by Brian Pilkington (Reykjavík : Nýtt líf, 1984)
- Það var og - : 33 útvarpsþættir (Reykjavík : Nýtt líf, 1985)
- Tungumál fuglanna (published under the pseudonym Tómas Davíðsson) (Reykjavík : Svart á hvítu, 1987)
- Magnús : kvikmyndahandrit (Reykjavík : Nýtt líf, 1990)
- Laddi (Reykjavík : Líf og saga, 1991)
- Sigla himinfley, illustrated by Snorri Freyr Hilmarsson (Reykjavík : Skjaldborg, 1992)
- Vinir og kunningjar : óvenjulegar frásagnir af venjulegu fólki (Reykjavík : Dægradvöl, 1996)
- Einhvers konar ég (Reykjavík : JPV, 2003)
  - My self & I, trans. by Hallberg Hallmundsson (Reykjavík : JPV, 2004)
  - Bertels Sohn : ein Leben in Island, trans. by Maike Hannek (München : Rogner & Bernhard, 2011)
- Dauðans óvissi tími (Reykjavík : JPV, 2004)
- Valkyrjur (Reykjavík : JPV, 2005)
  - Walküren, trans. by Tina Flecken (München : Deutscher Taschenbuch Verlag, 2008)
- Englar dauðans (Reykjavík : JPV, 2007)
  - Höllenengel, trans. by Maike Hanneck (München : Deutsche Taschenbuch-Verlag, 2010)
  - Höllenengel : ein Island-Krimi, trans. by Maike Hanneck (Köln : Lingen, 2012)
- Ég ef mig skyldi kalla : seinþroskasaga (Reykjavík : Sögur, 2008)
- Fallið : fjölskylduleyndarmál (Reykjavík : Sögur, 2011)
