= Peter Raadsig =

Danish painter

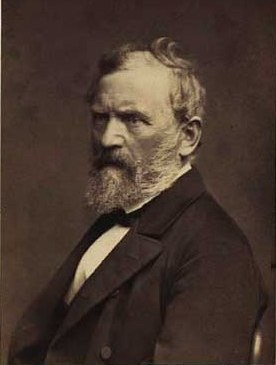
Peter Raadsig (1870s)

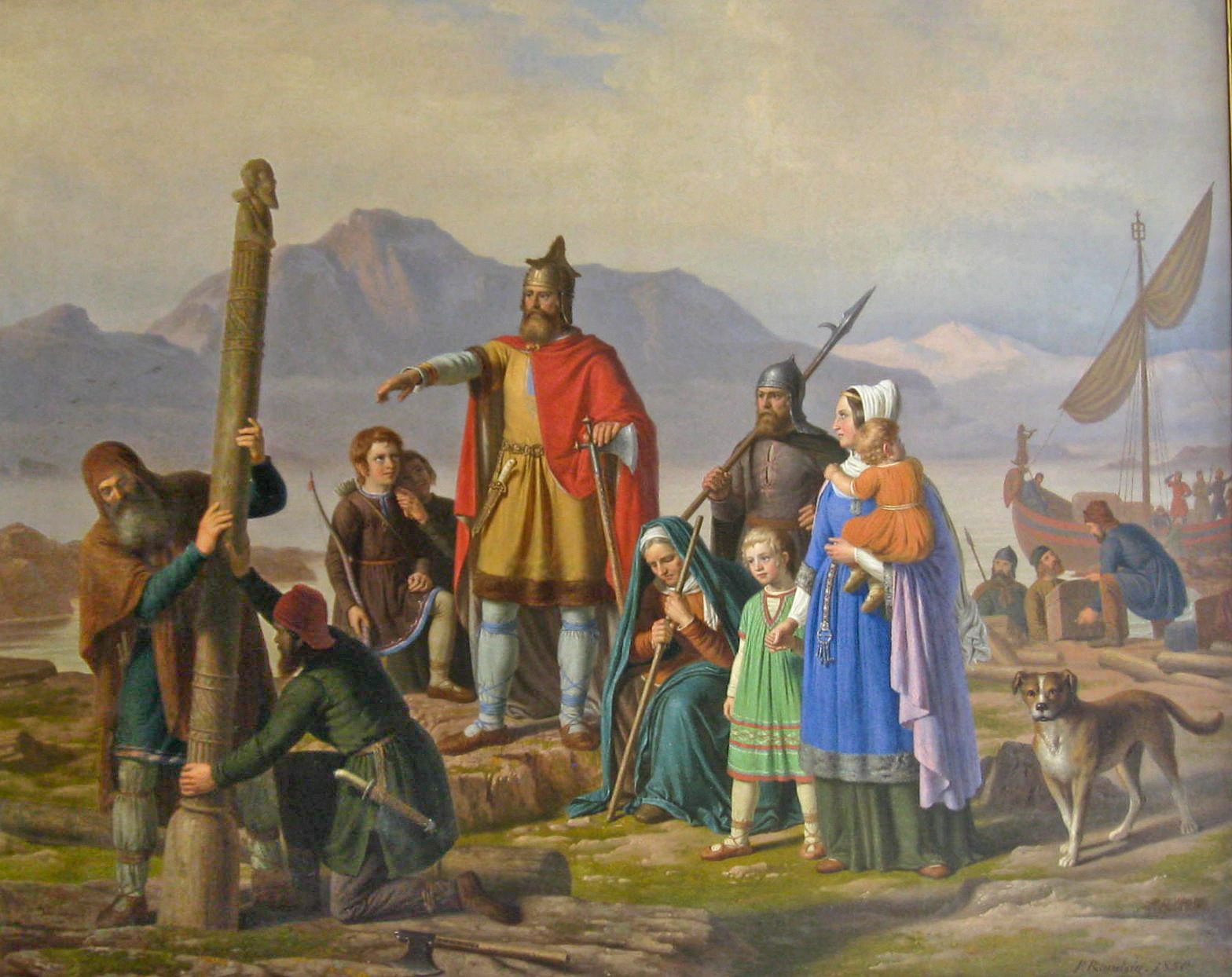
Ingolf tager Island i besiddelse (1850)

Johan Peter Raadsig (18 October 1806 – 1 July 1882) was a Danish painter, dealing principally with themes from Danish and, more broadly, Scandinavian history.

== Biography ==
Raadsig was born in Copenhagen, Denmark. He was the son of Søren Christian Raadsig and Ellen Pouline Poulsen. His father was a sailing master who died when Peter was very young. His mother remarried and he was raised in Skjoldenæsholm. After his confirmation, he was enrolled at the Royal Danish Academy of Fine Arts. While there, he was awarded several silver medals for his portraits and historical images and earned a reputation as a diligent painter. He first exhibited at the Charlottenborg Spring Exhibition in 1830. The Royal Collection acquired four of his works between 1833 and 1840.

In 1838, he applied for travel support but, despite the recommendation of the Academy, was unsuccessful. He managed to travel some at his own expense. In 1841, he went to Rome, encouraged by some praise he had received from Bertel Thorvaldsen and C.W. Eckersberg. He received no financial help, however, and had to live austerely. He managed to study in Rome (1841–45) and in Munich (1845–46). When he returned, he was able to sell two more works to the Royal Collection.

Raadsig was occupied with topics from Danish history, especially as it was perceived in contemporary literature. In 1850 Raadsig made the painting Ingolf tager Island i besiddelse, depicting Ingólfr Arnarson, the first Norse settler of Iceland, newly arrived on the site of what would become Reykjavík, commanding his high seat pillars to be erected. The painting was made at the time when nationalist sentiment was rising in Iceland, a few years after the Icelanders' ancient general assembly, the Alþingi was re-established. The painting is currently on public display at Viðeyjarstofa in Viðey (an island near Reykjavík), where a plaque explains that it was a gift to the City of Reykjavík from Eimskipafélag Íslands on the occasion of the 200th birthday of Reykjavík (1986).

He was awarded De Neuhausenske Præmier by the Royal Danish Academy of Fine Arts in Copenhagen in connection with his work Vildttyve i forhør hos en birkedommer (1857).

He never married or had children. He died in Copenhagen and was buried at Valsølille Kirkegård in Ringsted.

His work is represented in the National Museum of Denmark in Copenhagen and at museums in Aarhus and Skagen.
