= Deep Winter =

1985 film

- Directed by: Þráinn Bertelsson
- Starring: Ragnheiður Arnardóttir
- Release date: 6 April 1985
- Running time: 88 minutes
- Country: Iceland
- Language: Icelandic

Deep Winter (Icelandic: Skammdegi) is a 1985 Icelandic drama film directed by Þráinn Bertelsson. The film was selected as the Icelandic entry for the Best Foreign Language Film at the 58th Academy Awards, but was not accepted as a nominee.

== Cast ==
- Ragnheiður Arnardóttir as Elsa
- María Sigurðardóttir as Unnur
- Hallmar Sigurðsson as Magnús
- Eggert Þorleifsson as Einar
- Tómas Zoëga as Gísli
- Valur Gíslason as Stjórnarformaður
- Tómas Agnar Tómasson as Stjórnarmaður

== See also ==
- List of submissions to the 58th Academy Awards for Best Foreign Language Film
- List of Icelandic submissions for the Academy Award for Best Foreign Language Film
