= Ingólfr Arnarson =

Norse explorer (c. 849 – c. 910)

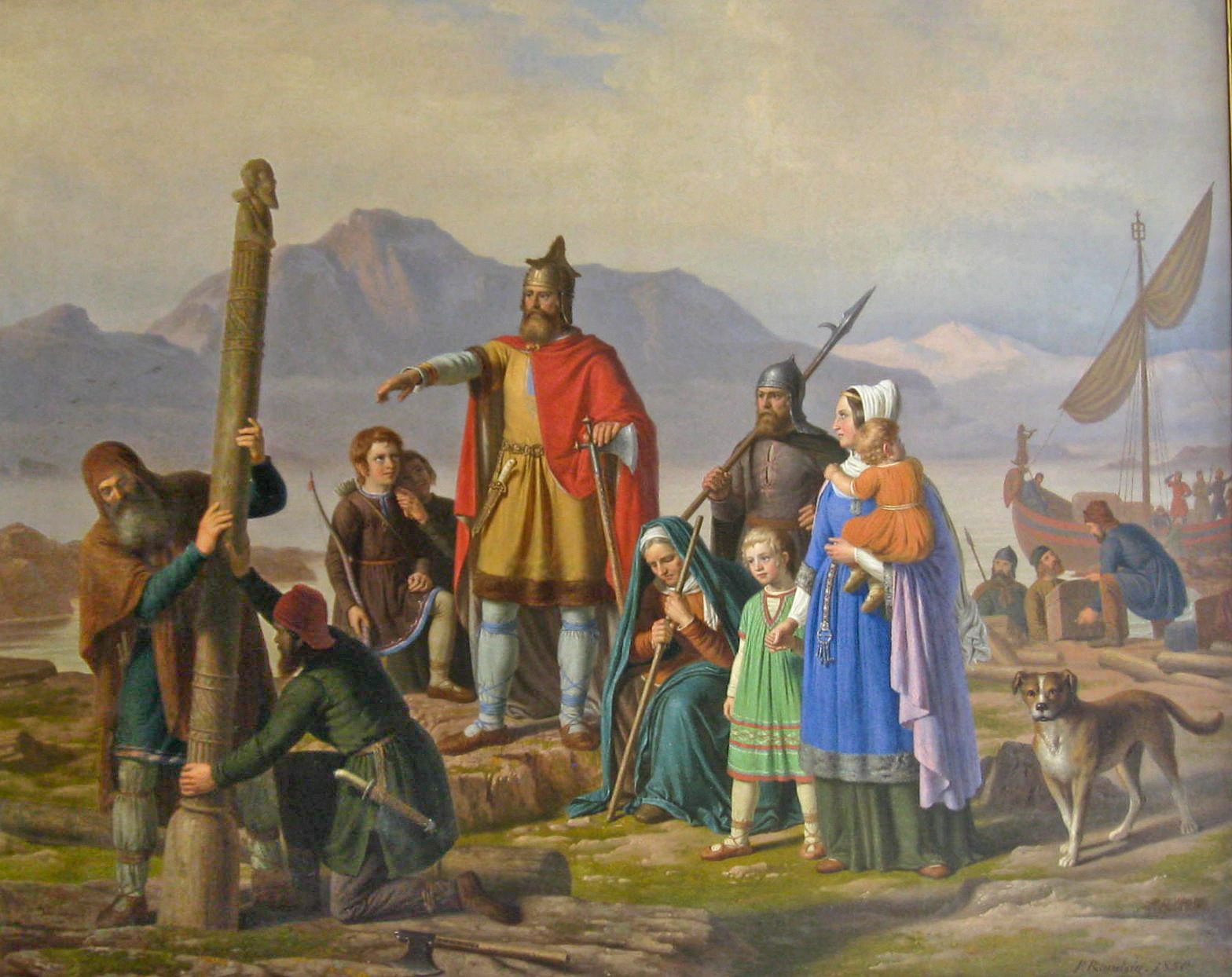
- Ingolf tager Island i besiddelse by Johan Peter Raadsig (1850)
- Born: c. 849; Rivedal, Sunnfjord, Kingdom of Fjordane
- Died: c. 910; Reykjavík, pre-Commonwealth Iceland
- Occupation: Seafarer
- Known for: First permanent Norse settler in Iceland
- Children: Þorsteinn Ingólfsson (son) Þórny Ingolfsdóttir (daughter)
- Relatives: Örn Björnólfsson (father); Hjörleifr Hróðmarsson (blood brother)

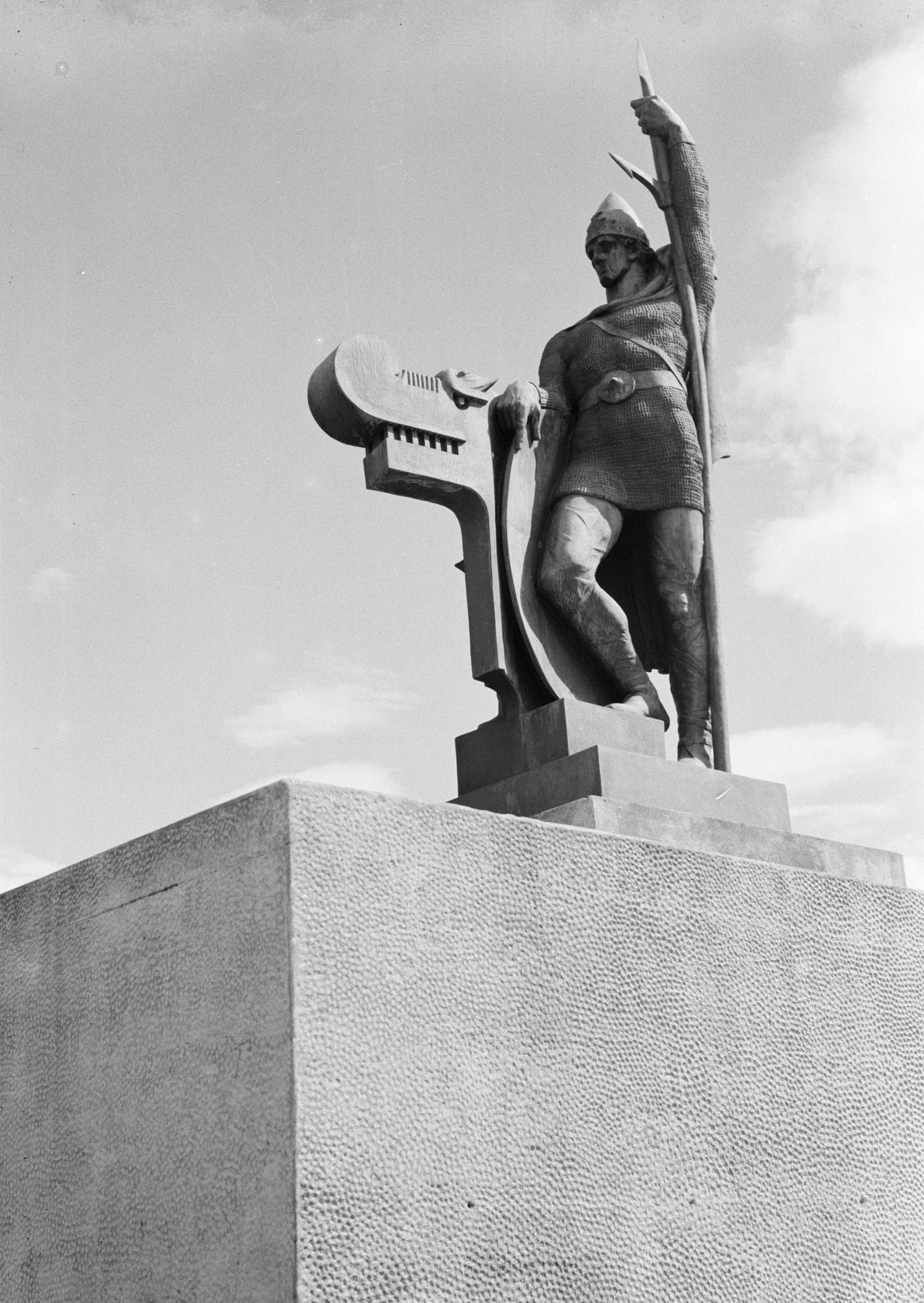
The famous statue by Einar Jónsson, up on Arnarhóll in Reykjavík

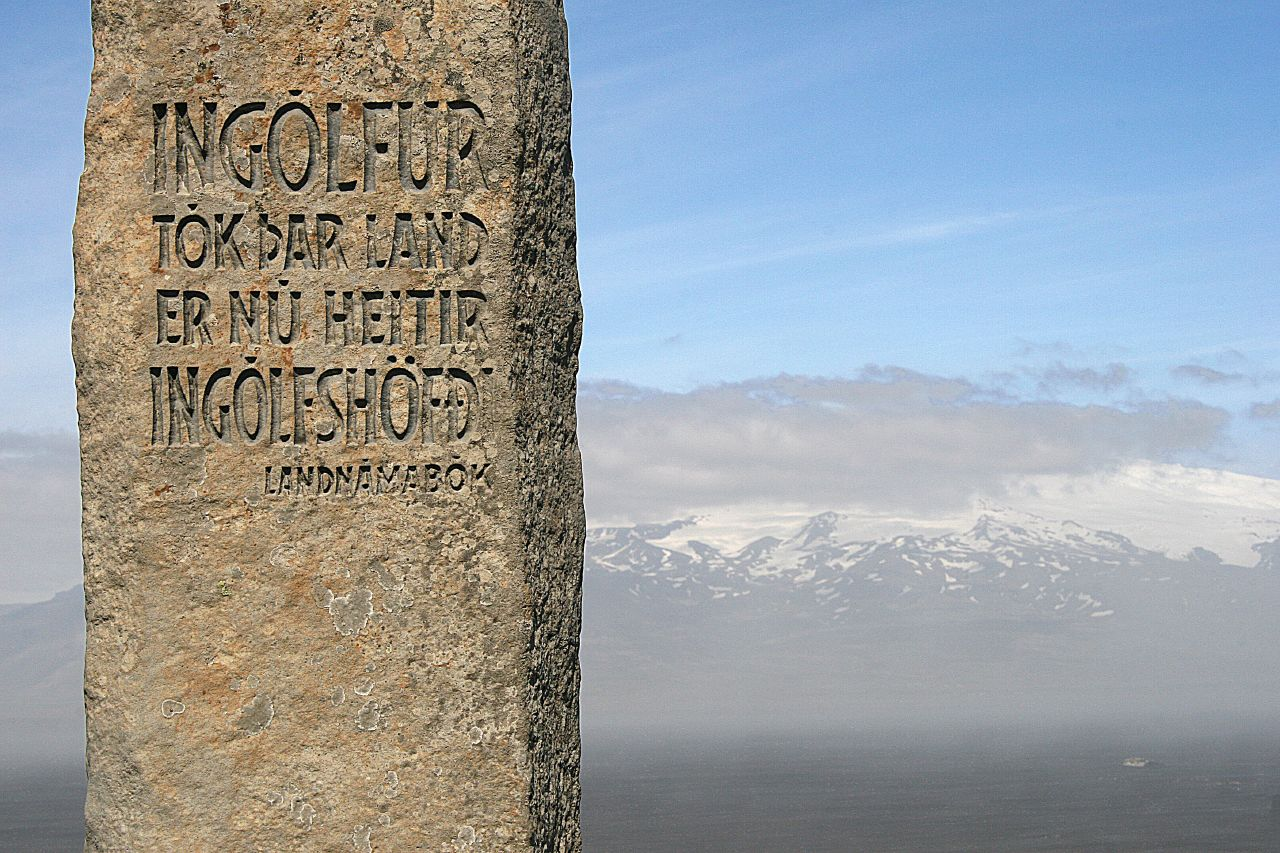
Monument at Ingólfshöfði, the site where Ingólfr is said to have passed his first winter in Iceland

Ingólfr Arnarson, in some sources named Björnólfsson, (Note: Old Norse pronunciation: [ˈiŋɡˌolvz̠ ˈɑrnˌɑrsˌson], [ˈbjɔrnˌolvsˌson]. In Modern Icelandic: Ingólfur Arnarson [ˈiŋkˌoulvʏr ˈa(r)tnˌar̥sˌsɔːn], Björnólfsson [ˈpjœ(r)tnˌoul(f)sˌsɔːn]. In Modern Norwegian: Ingolv Arnesson or Ørnsson, Norwegian pronunciation: [ˈɪ̂ŋˌgɔłv ˈɑ̂ːɳəˌsɔn] or Norwegian pronunciation: [ˈø̀ːɳˌʂɔn]) (c. 849 – c. 910) is commonly recognized as the first Icelander, when he became the first Norse settler of Iceland, together with his wife Hallveig Fróðadóttir and foster brother Hjǫrleifr Hróðmarsson. According to tradition, they settled in Reykjavík in 874.

== Biography ==
Ingólfr Arnarson was from the valley of Rivedal in Sunnfjord in western Norway. According to the Icelandic Book of Settlements, he built his homestead in and gave name to Reykjavík in 874. However, archaeological finds in Iceland suggest settlement may have started somewhat earlier. The medieval chronicler Ari Þorgilsson said Ingólfr was the first Nordic settler in Iceland, but mentioned that Irish monks had been in the country before the Norsemen. He wrote that they left because they did not want to live among the newly arrived Norse pagans. However, the existence of the Papar in Iceland remains archaeologically unproven. Excavations on Papey, a site traditionally associated with the Papar, documented ninth-century Norse settlement but found no traces of Papar.

The Book of Settlements (written two to three centuries after the settlement) contains a story about Ingólfr's arrival. The book claims he left Norway after becoming involved in a blood feud. He had heard about a new island which Garðar Svavarsson, Hrafna-Flóki and others had found in the Atlantic Ocean. With his blood brother Hjörleifr Hróðmarsson, he sailed for Iceland. When land was in sight, he threw his high seat pillars overboard and promised to settle where the gods decided to bring them ashore. Two of his slaves then searched the coasts for three years before finding the pillars in the small bay which eventually became the site of Reykjavík.

In the meantime, Hjörleifr had been murdered by his Irish slaves. Ingólfr hunted them down and killed them in the Westman Islands. The islands got their name from that event, with westmen (Old Norse: vestmenn) being a name that the Norsemen used for the Irish. Ingólfr was said to have settled a large part of southwestern Iceland, although after his settlement nothing more was known of him.

His son, Þórsteinn Ingólfsson, was a major chieftain and was said to have founded the Kjalarnesþing, the first thing, or parliament, in Iceland. It was a forerunner of the Althingi.

== Legacy ==
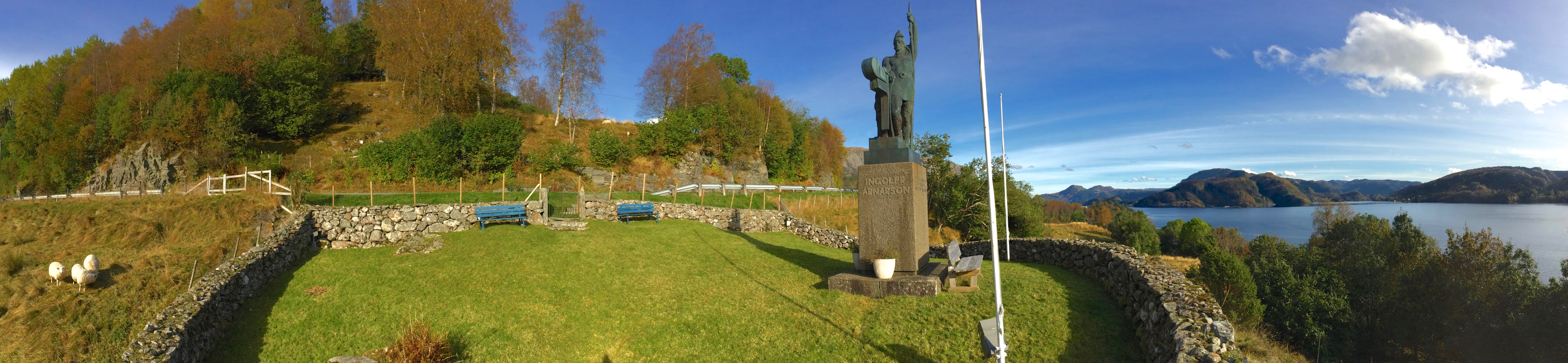
Statue of Ingólfr Arnarson at Rivedal in Sogn og Fjordane

In 1924, a statue of Ingólfr Arnarson, designed by Icelandic sculptor Einar Jónsson (1874–1954), was erected in Reykjavík. A copy of the statue was erected at Rivedal in 1961.

== See also ==
- Settlement of Iceland
- Viking expansion
