= Gísli Rúnar Jónsson =

Icelandic actor (1953–2020)

Gísli Rúnar Jónsson (20 March 1953 – 28 July 2020) was an Icelandic actor, screenwriter and director.

== Early years ==
Gísli was born in Reykjavík, Iceland in 1953 to parents Guðrún Valgerður Gísladóttir, a housewife and Jón Konráð Björnsson, a local business man. Gísli has three siblings.

== Career ==
Gísli is mostly known for his involvement with Icelandic comedies and sitcoms in the 1980s. He wrote and directed the sitcoms Heilsubælið í Gerfahverfi and Fastir liðir eins og venjulega, which become hugely successful in Iceland and have been played on reruns every few years for the last 30 years.

In 1996 Gísli hosted his own talk show called Gott kvöld með Gísla Rúnari (English: Good Evening with Gísli Rúnar) on Stöð 2.

In addition to starring in numerous plays Gísli was also a vivid screenwriter and translator of foreign plays into Icelandic. To name a few of his translations are Little Shop of Horrors, Grease and Mary Poppins.

In 2001, Gísli wrote the biography of singer Björgvin Halldórsson. In 2011 he published the book Ég drepst þar sem mér sýnist (English: I'll die wherever I feel like), a book filled with funny stories from his early days as a comedian.

== Personal life ==
Gísli was married to actress Edda Björgvinsdóttir. They met in drama school in the 1970s and were divorced in 2000, though they remained close friends. They have two sons, who like their parents both took to acting, Björgvin Franz Gíslason and Róbert Ólíver Gíslason. He had two other children from other relationships.

His son Róbert was diagnosed with Tourette syndrome as a child. Gísli, as well as his older son, Björgvin, was thought to have the disorder although he was never diagnosed by a professional.

Gísli was an alcoholic and stopped drinking in 1987.
