= Dóri DNA =

Halldór Laxness Halldórsson
- Born: 16 May 1985 (age 39)
- Other names: Dóri DNA
- Occupations: Actor; author; comedian; rapper; television personality
- Parents: Guðný Halldórsdóttir; Halldór Þorgeirsson
- Relatives: Auður Laxness (grandmother); Halldór Laxness (grandfather)

Halldór Laxness Halldórsson (born 16 May 1985), better known as Dóri DNA, is an Icelandic actor, author, comedian, rapper and television personality. He has hosted the TV-shows Skítamix on Stöð 2 and Veislan on RÚV. In 2020, he started appearing as Colonel Sanders in advertisements for KFC in Iceland. In May 2022, he released the single Því þú átt það skilið, along with Þormóður Eiríksson and Króli, and appeared as Sanders in the music video.

Halldór is the son of filmmakers Guðný Halldórsdóttir and Halldór Þorgeirsson and grandson of writer and Nobel Prize winner Halldór Laxness and writer and craftswoman Auður Laxness.

== Bibliography ==
=== TV ===
Venjulegt fólk (2018-) Afturelding (2023)

=== Films ===
Northern Comfort (2023)

=== Novels ===
- 2019: Kokkáll

=== Plays ===
- 2015: Þetta er grín, án djóks (with Saga Garðarsdóttir)
- 2019: Atómstöðin - endurlit, Þjóðleikhúsið (with Una Þorleifsdóttir)
- 2021 Þétting Hryggðar (with Una Þorleifsdóttur)

=== Poetry ===
- 2015: Hugmyndir: Andvirði hundrað milljónir
- 2017: Órar, martraðir og hlutir sem ég hugsa um þegar ég er að keyra
