= The Honour of the House =

1999 film

- Directed by: Guðný Halldórsdóttir
- Written by: Guðný Halldórsdóttir
- Starring: Tinna Gunnlaugsdóttir
- Music by: Hilmar Örn Hilmarsson
- Release date: 8 October 1999
- Running time: 103 minutes
- Country: Iceland
- Language: Icelandic

The Honour of the House (Icelandic: Ungfrúin góða og húsið) is a 1999 Icelandic film directed by Guðný Halldórsdóttir. It is based on the novel of the same name by Halldór Laxness. It was Iceland's official Best Foreign Language Film submission at the 72nd Academy Awards, but did not manage to receive a nomination.

== Cast ==
- Tinna Gunnlaugsdóttir as Þuríður
- Ragnhildur Gísladóttir as Rannveig
- Agneta Ekmanner as Prófastsfrú
- Rúrik Haraldsson as Prófastur
- Egill Ólafsson as Björn

== See also ==
- List of submissions to the 72nd Academy Awards for Best Foreign Language Film
- List of Icelandic submissions for the Academy Award for Best Foreign Language Film
