= Hallveig Fróðadóttir =

Iceland's first female settler, 874 AD

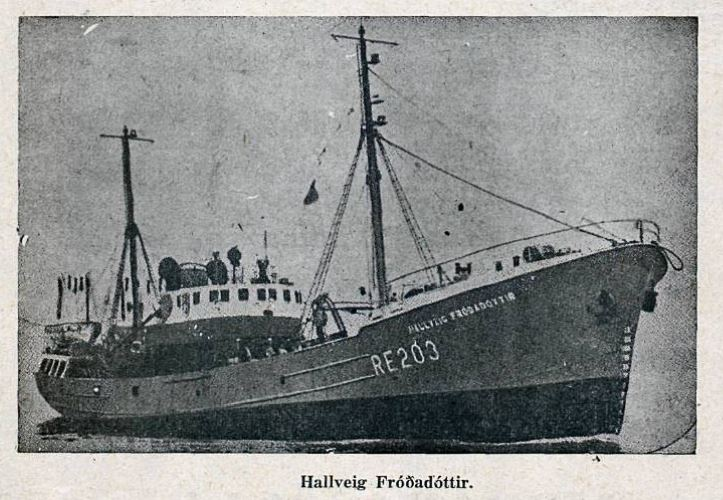
The first Icelandic diesel tug was named after Hallveig Fróðadóttir in 1948.

Hallveig Fróðadóttir (fl. 870s) is traditionally considered Iceland's first female settler. She was married to Íngolfr Arnarson, the first settler of Iceland and founder of Reykjavík.

According to Landnámabók, she was the daughter of Fróði and the sister of Loft the Old. She and Íngolfr had a son, Þorsteinn, who established an early thing at Kjalarnes. Through him, she was the grandmother of the lawspeaker Þorkell máni Þorsteinsson. Another child, Þórnýja, is mentioned in the late Kjalnesinga saga.

She gives her name to Iceland’s first diesel tug and to the women’s centre Hallveigarstaðir in Reyjavík.
