= Ahead of Time (film) =

2004 Icelandic film by Ágúst Guðmundsson

- Directed by: Ágúst Guðmundsson
- Produced by: Jakob Frímann Magnússon
- Cinematography: Víðir Sigurðsson; Ingi R. Ingason
- Edited by: Sævar Guðmundsson
- Music by: Stuðmenn
- Production company: Bjarmaland
- Release date: 26 December 2004
- Running time: 95 minutes
- Country: Iceland
- Language: Icelandic

Ahead of Time (Icelandic: Í takt við tímann) is a 2004 Icelandic musical comedy film directed by Ágúst Guðmundsson. It is about the comeback of the band Stuðmenn, known from Ágúst Guðmundsson's 1982 film On Top.

== Cast ==
- Gísli Marteinn Baldursson as himself
- Helga Braga Jónsdóttir as Urður
- Andrea Gylfadóttir as Verðandi
- Ragnhildur Gísladóttir as Harpa Sjöfn Hermundardóttir
- Jakob Magnússon as Frímann Flygering
- Stefan B. Onundarson as Band member
- Hrönn Steingrímsdóttir as Skuld
- Stuðmenn
- Tómas M. Tómasson as Skafti Sævarsson
- Þórður Árnason as Baldvin Roy Pálmason
- Egill Ólafsson as Kristinn Styrkársson Proppé
- Höskuldur Ólafsson as Kári Már Hörpuson
- Ásgeir Óskarsson as Hafþór Ægisson
- Eggert Þorleifsson as Dúddi

== Reception ==
Variety's Robert Koehler wrote:

This half-cracked cousin of Abba may be worthy of an extended video, but at feature length, goofball exercise gets lost in the Icelandic snow. ... Nearly every scene here is punctuated by a musical number, some recalling Jacques Demy, others resembling Europeanized MTV videos, and all trying extremely hard to be funny. This effort to be humorous makes Ahead of Time play like a wildly overextended joke on the theme of the folly of old rockers trying once again to get their groove on.
