= Steinunn Ólína Þorsteinsdóttir =

Icelandic actress, television show host, producer, and writer

- Born: 2 July 1969 (age 57); Reykjavík, Iceland
- Education: Drama Centre London
- Occupation: Actress
- Years active: 1990–present
- Spouse: Stefán Karl Stefánsson (m. 2002; died 2018)
- Children: 4

Steinunn Ólína Þorsteinsdóttir (born 2 July 1969) is an Icelandic actress, TV show host, producer and writer.

== Biography ==
=== Early life ===
Ólína grew up in Reykjavík with her mother, actress Bríet Héðinsdóttir, and her father Þorsteinn Þorsteinsson, a writer and translator of dramatic literature. She first found fame with a starring stage role at the age of fifteen. At seventeen, she moved to London, England to study drama at the Drama Centre London, from which she graduated in 1990. She subsequently moved back to Iceland to re-launch a career on the stage and television as a mature artist, making her debut at the National Theatre of Iceland in the role of Solveig in Henrik Ibsen's Peer Gynt.

=== National Theatre and elsewhere ===
Eventually, Ólína was hired as a contracted star player at the National Theatre of Iceland, where she spent the next fourteen years appearing in over 50 productions and portraying a range of leading characters in contemporary and classical plays. Her many significant roles at the National included Eliza Doolittle in My Fair Lady by Lerner and Loewe and Hodel in Fiddler on the Roof. She also contributed to several stage productions of comedy and farce, such as Ray Cooney's Two for One and in Michael Frayn's Noises Off as the misfortunate actress Dotty Otley. She has interpreted many classical characters such as Irena, in Chekhov's Three Sisters, Aglaja in a dramatization of The Idiot by Dostoyevsky and Queen Margaret in Shakespeare's Richard III for which she garnered the prestigious “Grima awards” (The Mask) in 2004.

Ólína has been featured in numerous high-profile stage productions with several different acting companies, tackling leading roles in plays by masters of the absurd such as in Eugène Ionesco's The Lesson, her portrayal of Roxie Hart in Chicago by Kander and Ebb as a guest star with the Reykjavík Theatre Ensemble.

=== Television and film work ===
Ólína produced, wrote, directed and hosted her own live talk show, Over My Dead Body with Steinunn Ólína, on the Icelandic State Broadcasting Television Channel 1. She has also contributed to other television shows as a comedian and writer, such as the RUV-TV's "New Year's Eve Comedy Hour Variety Show", the most preeminent annual event on national television in Iceland, to which she has rendered her services on several occasions. Ólína has also appeared in a handful of television plays, sitcoms and feature films, including Beowulf & Grendel in 2005. In 2019, she appeared in the Icelandic drama film Eden.

=== Personal life ===
She became a novelist with the publishing of her semi-autobiographical novella Parental Guidance, which was a number one bestseller in Iceland in 2006. In 2004, she moved to the United States where she resided in Los Angeles with her husband Stefán Karl Stefánsson and four children. Her husband died on 21 August 2018.
