= Guðný Halldórsdóttir =

Icelandic film director

- Born: 23 January 1954 (age 72); Iceland
- Occupations: Film director Screenwriter
- Years active: 1983–present
- Parents: Halldór Laxness (father); Auður Laxness (mother)
- Relatives: Dóri DNA (son)
- Awards: Edda Award for Best Director

Guðný Halldórsdóttir (born 23 January 1954) is an Icelandic film director and screenwriter. She has directed eight films since 1984, including Under the Glacier and The Honour of the House. She wrote the screenplay for 1986 comedy Stella í orlofi (Stella on Vacation) and directed its 2002 sequel, Stella í framboði (Stella running for Office). Her 2007 film The Quiet Storm was entered into the 30th Moscow International Film Festival. Her father was writer and 1955 Nobel Prize winner Halldór Laxness, while her mother was writer and textile designer Auður Laxness. Her son is rapper, actor and comedian Halldór Laxness Halldórsson, better known as Dóri DNA.

== Selected filmography ==
- Stella í orlofi (Stella on Vacation) (1986)
- Under the Glacier (1989)
- The Honour of the House (1999)
- Stella í framboði (Stella running for Office) (2002)
- The Quiet Storm (2007)
