= Karl Ágúst Úlfsson =

Icelandic film actor

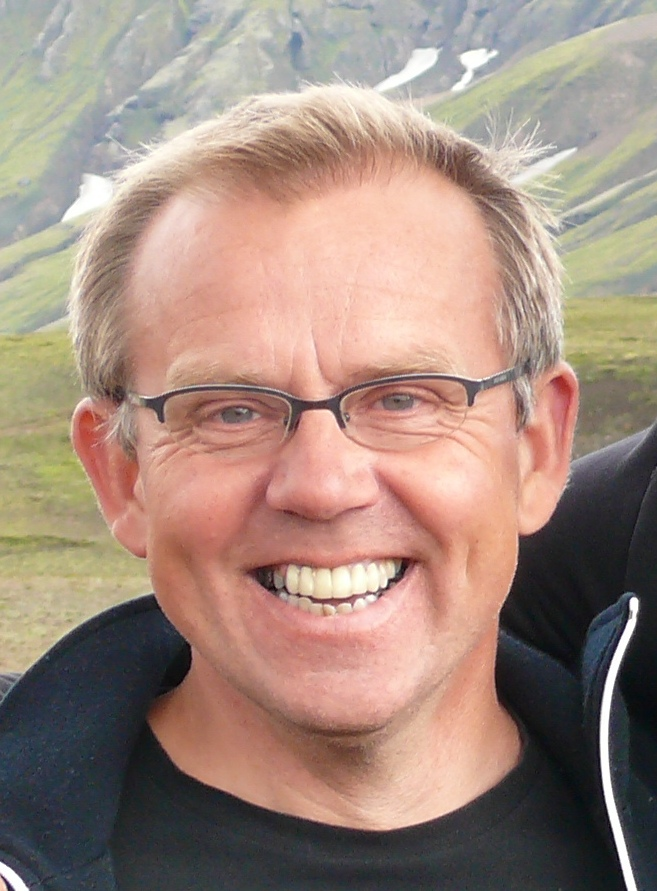
- Born: 4 November 1957 (age 68); Iceland
- Occupations: Actor, director, writer
- Years active: 1978–present
- Known for: Spaugstofan; Líf trilogy
- Spouse: Ásdís Olsen

Karl Ágúst Úlfsson (born 4 November 1957) is an Icelandic director, actor and writer. He is best known for his acting in the Líf trilogy and with the comedy group Spaugstofan.

Karl has dubbed many characters into Icelandic, in films and TV shows such as Pumbaa and Rafiki in The Lion King movies, the Timon and Pumbaa tv-series, and The Lion Guard and Hamm in Toy Story, Karl is also the icelandic voice of Goofy.

== Selected filmography ==
- Nýtt Líf (1983) - Daníel Ólafsson
- Dalalíf (1984) - Daníel Ólafsson
- Löggulíf (1985) - Daníel Ólafsson
- Harry & Heimir: Morð eru til alls fyrst (2014) - Harry
