= Odd Fish =

2023 film by Snævar Sölvi Sölvason

- Ljósvíkingar
- Directed by: Snævar Sölvi Sölvason
- Written by: Snævar Sölvi Sölvason
- Produced by: Júlíus Kemp; Ingvar Þórðarson
- Starring: Björn Jörundur Friðbjörnsson; Arna Magnea Danks; Helgi Björnsson; Vigdís Hafliðadóttir; Pálmi Gestsson
- Cinematography: Birgit Guðjónsdóttir
- Music by: Mugison
- Production company: The Icelandic Film Company
- Release date: September 3, 2024
- Country: Iceland
- Language: Icelandic

Odd Fish (Icelandic: Ljósvíkingar) is a 2024 Icelandic drama film directed and written by Snævar Sölvi Sölvason. The film stars Björn Jörundur Friðbjörnsson and Arna Magnea Danks as two childhood friends who get a long-awaited opportunity to found and run a seafood restaurant together. When one of them comes out of the closet as a trans woman, their friendship gets tested. The film premiered on 3 September 2024.

== Cast ==
- Björn Jörundur Friðbjörnsson
- Arna Magnea Danks
- Sólveig Arnarsdóttir
- Ólafía Hrönn Jónsdóttir
- Helgi Björnsson
- Vigdís Hafliðadóttir
- Pálmi Gestsson

== Plot ==
Hjalti and Bjössi run a seafood restaurant near the arctic circle. Hjalti also runs the local museum and has a gay son. The restaurant closes for the winter, and Bjössi's father dies shortly after. Plans for Northern Lights tourism offer the chance for the restaurant to operate in winter. Bjössi comes out as trans Birna at a meeting of the town's men . Hjalti asks Birna if this is a joke. The women who work at the restaurant are more accepting. Hjalti's marriage is failing, and he still has difficulty dealing with Birna. His mind is not on the first night with the Danish tour company, but it is a triumph and he apologises to Birna. Hjalti goes to Reykjavík to spend Christmas with his family and learns about the bullying his gay son endured in the small town. A year later Hjalti returns with his wife to the restaurant, which Birna is successfully running.

== Reception ==
The film has received generally favourable reviews from critics. Kolbeinn Rastrick from RÚV praised the film, stating "It's heartwarming and funny even though it doesn't dig too deep, and it's refreshing to see a movie that gives queerness space to exist in the joy and not just the sadness."

Ásdís Ásgeirsdóttir from Morgunblaðið gave the film three and a half stars, saying "Ljósvíkingar is therefore overall a successful and humane film that paints a believable picture of the relationship between childhood friends at a turning point. This is a heartwarming film that Icelandic viewers should not miss."
