= Gljúfrasteinn =

Gljúfrasteinn (2023) Photo Hreinn Guðlaugsson

Gljúfrasteinn (Icelandic pronunciation: [ˈklju(v)raˌsteitn̥]) is a writer's home museum, which was the former home of Halldór Kiljan Laxness, a 1955 Nobel Prize for Literature winner. It is located in Mosfellsbær, east of Reykjavík, Iceland. The name of the house is derived from a large stone in the vicinity called Gljúfrasteinn, about which Halldór wrote the short story "Steinninn minn helgi" at the age of 19.

The house was built in 1945 by Halldór and his wife Auður Sveinsdóttir. The architect was Ágúst Pálsson and the interior designer was Birta Fróðadóttir. Gljúfrasteinn is built on the banks of the river Kaldakvísl and is situated close to Laxness's childhood home, Laxnes.

Halldór Laxness was a prominent figure in Icelandic society and his status only increased after he won the Nobel Prize in 1955. Laxness's home became a cultural hub in Iceland where important foreign guests were brought for official as well as unofficial visits. International musicians would frequently give concerts in his living room.

Paintings by some of the most celebrated 20th century Icelandic artists adorn the walls of Gljúfrasteinn. Visitors can view works by artists such as Svavar Guðnason, Nína Tryggvadóttir, Louisa Matthíasdóttir, Jóhannes Kjarval, Karl Kvaran, Ásmundur Sveinsson, as well as works by the Danish painter Asger Jorn and the Norwegian painter Jakob Weidemann.

In 2002, Laxness's widow, Auður, sold the house to the Icelandic state. In September 2004, it was opened for the public as a museum. Visitors can take a guided tour through the house, and the museum hosts concerts during the summer.
