= Edda Björgvinsdóttir =

Icelandic actress and comedian

- Born: 13 September 1952 (age 73); Reykjavík, Iceland
- Occupation: Actress
- Television: Heilsubælið í Gervahverfi; Áramótaskaupið
- Spouse: Gísli Rúnar Jónsson (divorced)
- Children: Björgvin Franz Gíslason; Róbert Ólíver Gíslason

Guðbjörg Edda Björgvinsdóttir (born 13 September 1952), better known as Edda Björgvinsdóttir, is an Icelandic actress, comedian, writer, director and motivational speaker. She is best known for playing the title role of the 1986 comedy classic Stella í orlofi, for playing various characters in the 1986 sitcom Heilsubælið í Gervahverfi, as well as for her work in the annual comedy special Áramótaskaupið, and for numerous other comedic roles in film, television and on stage.

== Early years and education ==
Edda was born in Reykjavík, Iceland in 1952. When she was about two years old her family moved to the countryside, where her father was the headmaster of a boarding school for troubled boys. She graduated from Menntaskólinn við Hamrahlíð in 1972. She studied philosophy at the University of Iceland in 1973 and radiologic technology at the Polytechnic School of Reykjavík in 1974. She then studied drama for one year at the United Drama School (Leiklistarskóli leikhúsanna) from 1974-1975 and continued her studies at the Icelandic State Drama School and The Icelandic Academy of Arts in Reykjavík, graduating with distinction in 1978 with a Bachelor of Arts degree in Performing Arts. In 2013 Edda graduated with master's degree in cultural management from Bifröst University.

== Career ==
Shortly after graduation, Edda made her debut at the National Theatre of Iceland in Reykjavík, in Jökull Jakobssons's drama The Shoemaker's Son and the Baker's Daughter (1978). She was praised by critics and audiences alike as one of the most individual and versatile actresses of her generation. She later appeared in comedic and dramatic roles, allowing for a broad career.

Edda had a short spell as a leading actress in serious dramas at the beginning of her career on stage and television, as well as being a featured lead in several motion pictures. The demand for her services as a comedienne increased considerably during the first two years of her career, eventually turning her into a full-time leading force on the comedy circuit in Iceland. Among the highlights of her film career are the comedy Stella í orlofi (1986) where she portrays a jilted yet irrepressibly optimistic wife, and Under the Tree (2017), a dark comedy drama. In 2025 she was the lead actress in the comedy TV series Felix og Klara, where she starred opposite comedian Jón Gnarr portraying an elderly couple.

== Personal life ==
Edda was married to actor and comedian Gísli Rúnar Jónsson. They met in drama school and were divorced in 2000, yet remained best of friends until his death. They had two sons, actors Björgvin Franz Gíslason and Róbert Ólíver Gíslason. Edda has two daughters from previous relationships, Eva Dögg and Margrét Ýrr. In 2018, she was awarded the Knight's Cross of the Order of the Falcon by the President of Iceland for her contribution to acting.

== Selected filmography ==
- When the Raven Flies (1984)
- Heilsubælið í Gervahverfi (1986)
- Stella í orlofi (1986)
- Karlakórinn Hekla (1992)
- The Sacred Mound (1993)
- Dramarama (2001)
- Stella í framboði (2002)
- Under the Tree (2017)
- Amma Hófí (2020)
- Felix and Klara (2025)
