= Sigurður Sigurjónsson =

Icelandic actor, comedian and screenwriter

- Occupations: Actor; comedian; screenwriter
- Years active: 1975–present
- Television: Spaugstofan

Sigurður Sigurjónsson, commonly referred to as Siggi Sigurjóns, is an Icelandic actor, comedian and screenwriter, best known as a member of the comedy group Spaugstofan. He has starred in a number of films and television series since the late 1970s, as well as acting in the National Theatre of Iceland. He is famous for his recurring characters in the Spaugstofan television series, including Ragnar Reykás and Kristján Ólafsson. Sigurður has starred in many seasons of the annual television special Áramótaskaupið. He is also one of the leading Icelandic voice actors and has dubbed numerous animated features. In March 2015, Sigurjóns appeared in the music video for "Crystals," the lead single from the Of Monsters and Men album "Beneath the Skin".

== Selected filmography ==
- A White, White Day (2019)
- Black Mirror (Episode: "Crocodile") (2017)
- Under the Tree (2017)
- Rams (2015)
- "Crystals" (2015) (Music video by Of Monsters and Men)
- Afinn (2014)
- Harry og Heimir: Morð eru til alls fyrst (2014)
- Borgríki 2 (2014)
- Borgríki (2011)
- Stella í framboði (2002)
- TaleSpin (1997)
- Anastasia (1997) (Icelandic voice of Bartok)
- Djöflaeyjan (1996)
- The Swan Princess (1996) (Icelandic voice of Puffin)
- The Lion King (1994) (Icelandic voice of Zazu)
- Bíódagar (1994)
- Skýjahöllin (1994)
- Karlakórinn Hekla (1992)
- Kristnihald undir Jökli (1989)
- Karlakórinn Hekla (1992)
- Stella í orlofi (1986)
- Second Dance (1983)
- Land og synir (1980)
