= Stella í framboði =

- Directed by: Guðný Halldórsdóttir
- Written by: Guðný Halldórsdóttir
- Starring: Edda Björgvinsdóttir; Laddi; Rúrik Haraldsson
- Edited by: Elísabet Ronaldsdóttir
- Music by: Ragnhildur Gísladóttir
- Release date: December 26, 2002
- Country: Iceland
- Language: Icelandic

Stella í framboði (English: Stella running for Office) is a 2002 Icelandic comedy film written and directed by Guðný Halldórsdóttir. It is a sequel to the 1986 comedy Stella í orlofi and stars Edda Björgvinsdóttir as Stella.
