= Simon Manyonda =

British actor (born 1986)

- Manyonda in 2020
- Born: 1986 (age 39–40); London, England
- Education: LAMDA
- Occupation: Actor
- Years active: 2009–present

Simon Manyonda (born 1986) is a British actor.

== Early life ==
Manyonda was born in Lambeth, London, the eldest son of a GP of medicine and a gynaecologist and obstetrician. He is of South African and Zimbabwean descent. Manyonda is the elder brother of two siblings.

== Filmography ==
=== Film ===
| Year | Title | Role | Notes |
|---|---|---|---|
| 2014 | King Lear | Oswald | |
| 2017 | The Current War | Lewis Latimer | |
| 2018 | In Fabric | Neal the Deal | |
| 2019 | Undergods | Reed Luther | |
| 2020 | The Witches | Sous Chef | |
| 2023 | Northern Comfort | Charles | |
| 2023 | Rye Lane | Nathan | |

=== Television ===
| Year | Title | Role | Notes |
|---|---|---|---|
| 2012 | Whitechapel | DO Sean Pinchin | 2 episodes |
| 2012 | Julius Caesar | Lucius | TV film. Made by the Royal Shakespeare Company for the BBC. |
| 2014 | Holby City | Tommy Bevan | 1 episode |
| 2015 | Suspects | Lewis | 1 episode |
| 2015 | Doctor Who | Kabel | Face the Raven |
| 2016 | Neil Gaiman’s Likely Stories | Gordon / Dr. N. Owen | TV miniseries. 3 episodes |
| 2017 | Uncle | Luca | 1 episode |
| 2017 | Level Up Norge | Cren | 1 episode |
| 2018 | Shakespeare & Hathaway: Private Investigators | Moses Abiola | 1 episode |
| 2018 | King Lear | Duke of Burgundy | TV film. Made by the Royal Shakespeare Company for the BBC. |
| 2019 | The Bay | D.S. Alexander Stewart | TV miniseries. 12 episodes. |
| 2019 | His Dark Materials | Benjamin De Ruyter | 3 episodes |
| 2020 | Pennyworth | Lucius Fox | Regular role (season 2) |
| 2022 | Van der Valk | Vito Vinke | Series 2, Episode 2 |

=== Stage ===
| Year | Title | Role | Notes |
|---|---|---|---|
| 2010 | Antony and Cleopatra | Messenger/Seleucus | Liverpool Playhouse |
| 2010 | Welcome to Thebes | Haemon | Royal National Theatre |
| 2011 | Obama – The Mamba: President of the Slums | George Obama | Leeds Playhouse |
| 2011 | Greenland (2011 play) | Adeel/Nigel | Lyttelton Theatre of the Royal National Theatre |
| 2012 | A Midsummer Night's Dream | Demetrius | Lyric Theatre (Hammersmith) |
| 2012 | All Night I Dream Of Being Good | Upstart | The Yard |
| 2012 | Julius Caesar | Lucius | Royal Shakespeare Company (also taped as a TV film for the BBC) |
| 2013 | A Midsummer Night's Dreaming | Demetrius | Brooklyn Academy of Music |
| 2013 | Red Peppers | George Peppers | Old Red Lion Theatre |
| 2014 | King Lear | Oswald | Olivier Theatre of the Royal National Theatre |
| 2014 | Wildefire | Chris | Hampstead Theatre |
| 2015 | Light Shining in Buckinghamshire | John Wildman / Second JP | Lyttelton Theatre of the Royal National Theatre |
| 2015 | Romeo & Juliet | Mercutio | Crucible Theatre |
| 2016 | Giving | Michael | Hampstead Theatre |
| 2016 | King Lear | Edmund | The Old Vic |
| 2017–2018 | Barber Shop Chronicles | Tanaka / Fiifi | West Yorkshire Playhouse and Dorfman Theatre of the Royal National Theatre |
| 2018 | The Way of the World | Petulant | Donmar Warehouse |
| 2019 | Alys, Always by Lucinda Coxon | Oliver | Bridge Theatre |
| 2019 | Actually by Anna Ziegler | Tom | Trafalgar Studios |
| 2020 | Far Away by Caryl Churchill | Todd | Donmar Warehouse |

=== Shorts ===
| Year | Title | Role | Notes |
|---|---|---|---|
| 2009 | How It's Done | That Guy | |
| 2014 | Off the Page: Groove is in the Heart | Jon | |
| 2018 | Alex's Dream | Lost Man | |

=== Audio ===
| Year | Title | Role | Notes |
|---|---|---|---|
| 2015 | Beasts of No Nation | Narrator | HarperAudio |
| 2022 | East of Eden | Narrator | Penguin Books |

=== Video games ===
| Year | Title | Role(s) | Notes |
|---|---|---|---|
| 2017 | Horizon Zero Dawn | Cren / Havash / Mournful Namman / Relentless Shivin | |

== Awards ==
Manyonda earned an Ian Charleson Award Commendation for his 2012 portrayal of Lucius in Julius Caesar at the Royal Shakespeare Company.
