= Hjörleifr Hróðmarsson =

Early settler of Iceland in the 9th century

Hjǫrleifr Hróðmarsson (Old Norse: [ˈhjɔrˌlɛivz̠ ˈhroːðˌmɑrsˌson]; Modern Icelandic: Hjörleifur Hróðmarsson [ˈçœrˌleiːvʏr ˈr̥ouðˌmar̥sˌsɔːn]; Modern Norwegian: Leif Rodmarsson) was an early settler in Iceland. The story of the early settlement of Iceland is told in the compilation known as Landnámabók.

Hjörleifr was the blood brother of Ingólfr Arnarson, the first settler of Iceland in the late 9th century. While raiding in Ireland, he found an underground passage and killed a man to take his sword. From this event his original name Leifr was lengthened to Hjǫrleifr (Old Norse hjǫrr: 'sword'). Hjörleifr settled on land on the mountain Hjörleifshöfði (east of Vík) which was named after him. He was later murdered by his thralls, many of whom were Irish or Scottish. The fugitive slaves were killed by Ingólfr Arnarson, thereby saving all the women who were held captive by the slaves.

== See also ==
- List of slave owners
