= Arnarhóll =

Hill in Iceland

Coordinates: 64.1479°N 21.9340°W

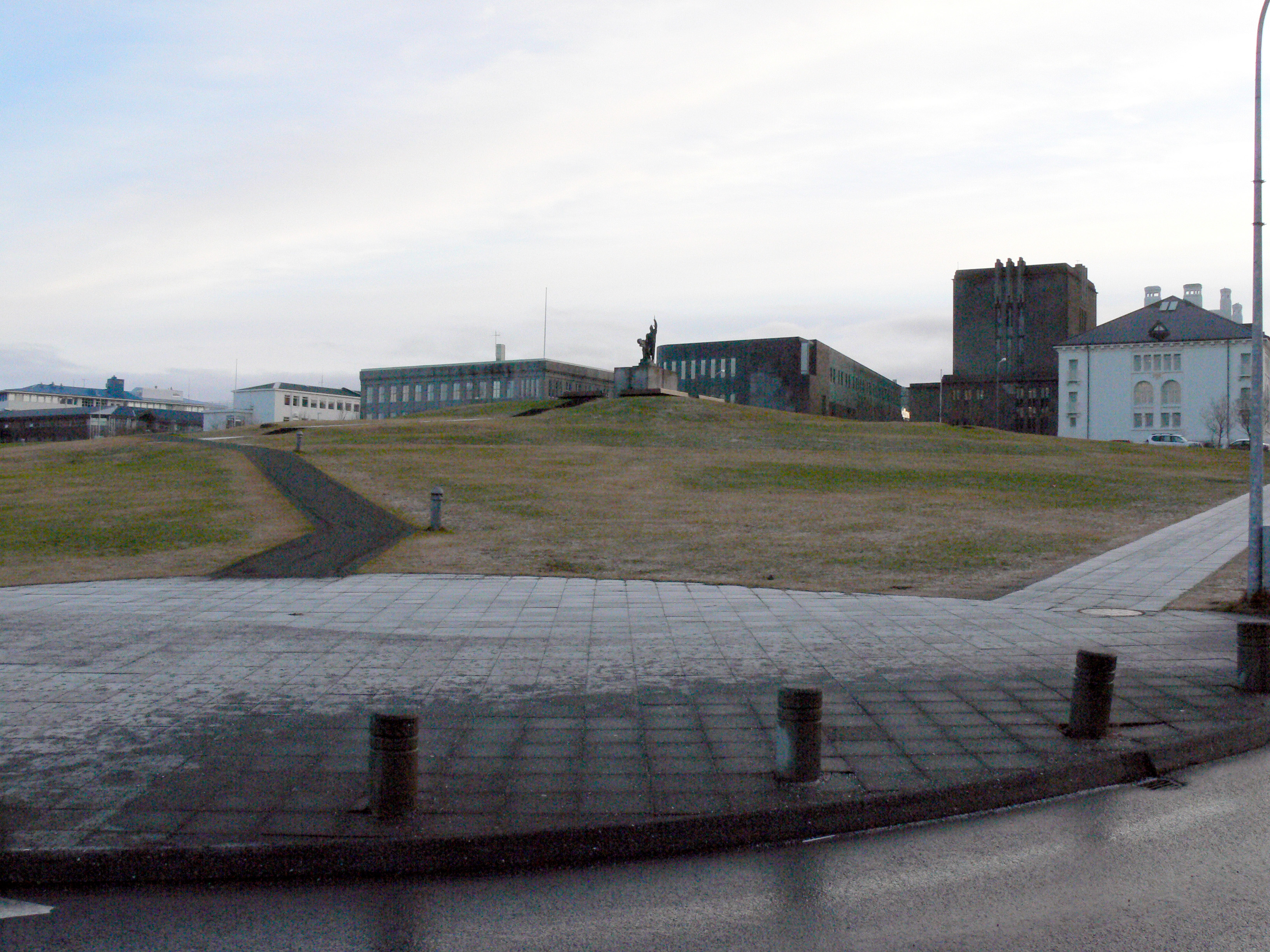
Arnarhóll

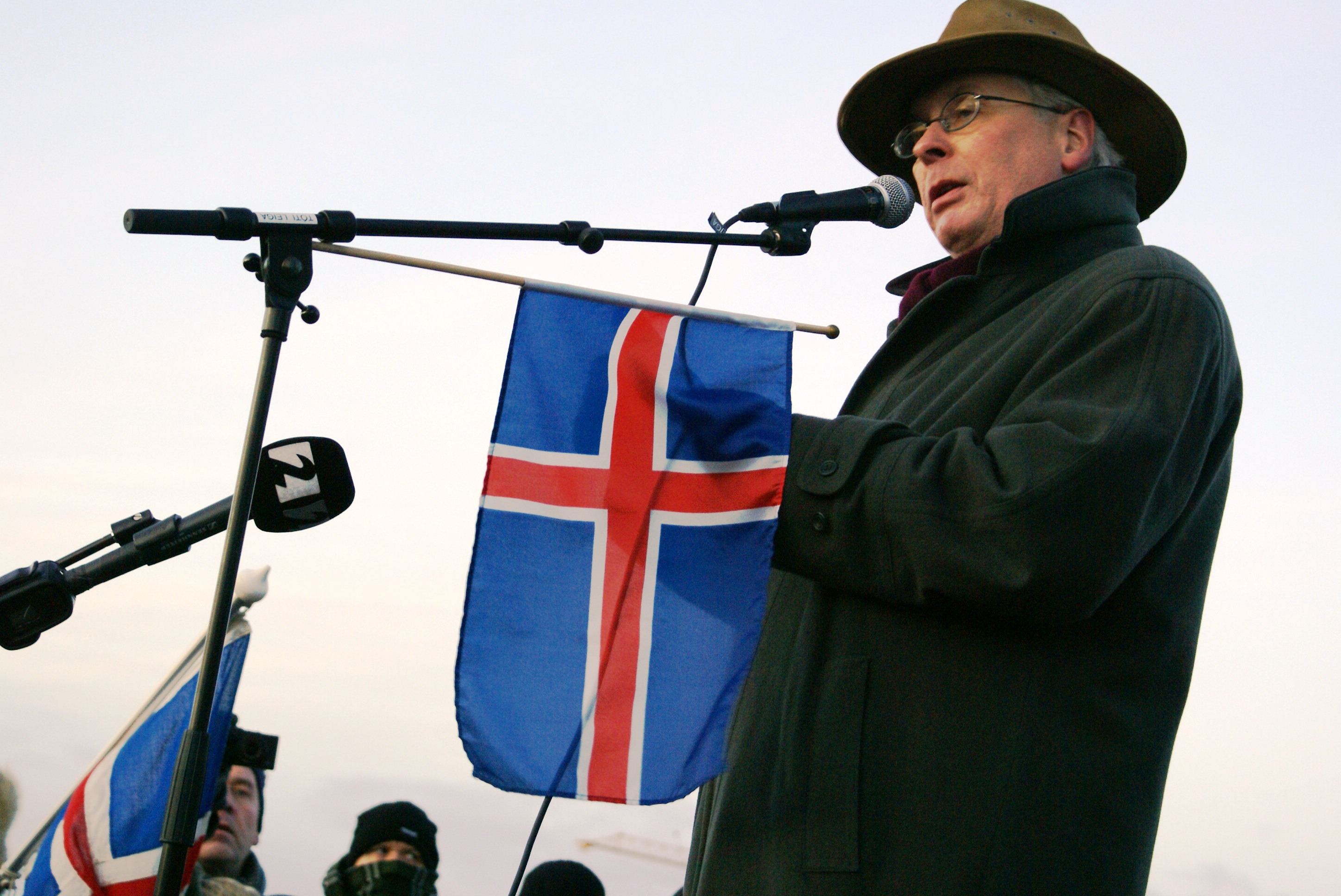
Speech at Arnárhóll in 2008 during Iceland's Kitchenware Revolution

Arnarhóll (Icelandic pronunciation: [ˈa(r)tnarˌhoutl̥]) is a hill next to the centre of Reykjavík, Iceland's capital city. It is named after Iceland's first settler, Ingólfur Arnarson. Icelandic ministries are situated near it and events take place on it.

== Description ==
Arnarhóll is a hill next to the centre of Reykjavík, Iceland's capital city. Many ministries are arranged on or around this hill, including the Ministry of Education and the Ministry of Justice. The Þjóðleikhús—Iceland's most famous theatre is just around the corner.

== Name ==
The hill is named after Iceland's bequeathed first settler, Ingólfur Arnarson. It is said that his slaves found the columns of his high seat at the foot of the hill, a good omen for vikings to install a settlement there. Ingólfur Arnarson started his first settlement at this place, after having passed two other winters in Iceland, the first one at Ingólfshöfði and the third one at Ingólfsfjall (now in the vicinity of Hveragerði) where Ingólfur was also buried according to Landnámabók.

== Importance ==
The site has a special importance for the people of Iceland. On Independence Day (17th of June), speeches are held up there or at its foot, which was also done during the so-called Kitchenware Revolution in 2008–2009.

Until some years ago, the final concert of Culture Night in mid-August was always held at its foot.
