= Arnar Jónsson (actor) =

Icelandic actor (born 1943)

- Born: 21 January 1943 (age 83); Akureyri, Iceland
- Spouse: Þórhildur Þorleifsdóttir

Arnar Jónsson (born 21 January 1943) is an Icelandic actor. He has played more leading roles in theaters than any other Icelandic actor. He starred in the film Outlaw and also in 17 other leading roles and about 200 other roles in theater.

== Personal life ==
Arnar was born in Akureyri. He is married to Þórhildur Þorleifsdóttir. He likes golf (he plays in competition) and also brought up 5 children. His daughter Sólveig Arnarsdóttir is also an actress.

== Filmography ==
Year	Title	Role	Notes
1966	Áramótaskaup 1966		
1978	Áramótaskaup 1978		
1981	Útlaginn	Gísli Súrsson	
1983	Á hjara veraldar		
1984	Atómstöðin	Gunnar	
1985	Fastir liðir: eins og venjulega	Halldór	
1992	Aladdin	Jafar	Icelandic version
1992	Ævintýri á Norðurslóðum	Föður	
1992	Karlakórinn Hekla	Kórfélagi	
1997	Maria	Jónas	
1998	Herbergi 6		
1998	Dansinn	Djákni	
2001	Mávahlátur	Sýslumaður	
2004	Njálssaga	Geir goði	
2004	Shrek 2	King Harold	Icelandic version
2006	Ørnen: En krimi-odyssé	Eggert	
2009	Bjarnfreðarson	Sævar	
2009	Up	Charles F. Muntz	Icelandic version
2015	Virgin Mountain	Rolf	
2017	Bokeh	Nils	
2019	Eden	Flugan	
