= Þórhildur Þorleifsdóttir =

Icelandic director, actress, dancer, choreographer, and politician

- Born: 25 March 1945 (age 81); Ísafjörður, Iceland
- Occupations: Actor, director, politician
- Spouse: Arnar Jónsson
- Relatives: Sólveig Arnarsdóttir (daughter); Eggert Þorleifsson (brother)

Þórhildur Þorleifsdóttir (born 25 March 1945) is an Icelandic theater, opera, film and television director, actress, dancer, choreographer and politician. She was the artistic director of the Reykjavík City Theatre from 1996 to 2000. She was a member of Alþingi from 1987 to 1991, representing The Women's List.

== Personal life ==
Þórhildur was born in Ísafjörður. She is married to Icelandic actor Arnar Jónsson. Their daughter is the Icelandic actress Sólveig Arnarsdóttir.

Þórhildur is the older sister of actor Eggert Þorleifsson.
