= Vigdís Hafliðadóttir =

Icelandic actress and human right activist (born 1970)

- Born: 1995 (age 29–30)
- Occupations: Actress; musician; comedian

Vigdís Hafliðadóttir (born 1995) is an Icelandic musician, comedian and actress. She was one of the writers and actors of the 2022 Áramótaskaup, the annual Icelandic television comedy special, broadcast on New Year's Eve by the state public service broadcaster RÚV. In 2023, she was slated to appear in the Icelandic drama Odd Fish.
