= Arna Magnea Danks =

Icelandic actress and human right activist (born 1970)

- Born: October 31, 1970 (age 55); Reykjavík, Iceland
- Occupations: Actress; fight/stunt director; teacher
- Years active: 2000s–present

Arna Magnea Danks (born 31 October 1970) is an Icelandic actress, fight/stunt director, and human rights activist. In 2023, she was cast as the lead in the Icelandic drama Odd Fish.
