= Auður Laxness =

Icelandic writer and craftswoman

- Born: 20 July 1918; Eyrarbakki, Danish Iceland
- Died: 29 October 2012 (aged 94); Reykjavík, Iceland
- Education: University of Iceland
- Occupations: Writer, craftswoman
- Spouse: Halldór Laxness
- Children: Two

Auður Sveinsdóttir Laxness (20 July 1918 – 29 October 2012) was an Icelandic writer and craftswoman, credited with influencing the design and popularity of the Icelandic Lopapeysa sweater during the mid-20th century. Her husband was Icelandic Nobel Literature laureate Halldór Laxness, and Auður worked as his secretary and writing collaborator for many years. In 2002, Auður received the Grand Cross of the Order of the Falcon for her contributions to Icelandic culture.

== Early life and marriage ==
Auður was born in the Icelandic village of Eyrarbakki on 20 July 1918, to Halldóra Kristín Jónsdóttir and Sveinn Guðmundsson. Her father was a blacksmith and when she was seven years old they moved to Vesturbær, the west-end of Reykjavík. She attended the University of Iceland and passed an examination at the Reykjavik University of Technology to become an X-ray technician. She began working as an X-ray specialist at the National University Hospital of Iceland in the late 1930s and would work there for twelve years. In 1937, she met the writer Halldór Laxness at her work. While she was working, she also enrolled in courses at the Icelandic Arts and Crafts School.

In 1945, Auður married Laxness and the following year she graduated and passed her examinations in handicrafts. The couple had two daughters, Sigríður and Guðný, and they lived in a house called Gljúfrasteinn, located in Mosfellsbær. Auður supported her husband's writing as his secretary and "close collaborator" up until his death in 1998.

== Writing, politics, and handicrafts ==
In 1944, Auður was among the founders of Melkorka, an Icelandic women's magazine. The magazine ran from 1944 to 1962, publishing both fiction and nonfiction on women's culture and politics. Auður was active in social affairs and women's rights campaigns during her lifetime.

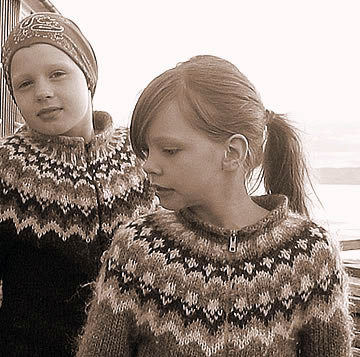
Two Icelandic girls wearing traditional Lopapeysa sweaters

Auður held a position on the editorial board of crafts magazine Hugur og hönd, producing articles on traditional Icelandic handicrafts such as weaving and knitting. Outside of her writing, Auður also designed her own knitting patterns for Icelandic wool, taught at Varmárskóli Elementary School in Mosfellsbær for two years and worked briefly at the National Museum of Iceland.

=== Lopapeysa sweater pattern ===
In an interview with media in 1998, Auður claimed to be the originator of the famed Icelandic Lopapeysa sweater pattern. Although the true extent of her contributions has been disputed, historians generally believe that Auður did influence the final knitting pattern, possibly through her development of a "circular pattern over the shoulder" inspired by a book on Inca culture. Another theory suggests that Auður brought back a version of the sweater after a trip to Greenland and replicated it herself during the late 1940s, inspired by old Icelandic patterns and imported embroidery techniques.

== Death ==
After spending her final years at a home for the elderly in Reykjavík, Auður died aged 94 on 29 October 2012.

== See also ==
- List of Icelandic writers
- Icelandic literature
