= Nýtt líf =

1983 Icelandic film by Þráinn Bertelsson

Nýtt Líf
- Directed by: Þráinn Bertelsson
- Written by: Þráinn Bertelsson
- Produced by: Jón Hermannsson
- Starring: Eggert Þorleifsson; Karl Ágúst Úlfsson
- Cinematography: Ari Kristinsson
- Edited by: Ari Kristinsson
- Music by: various
- Distributed by: Nýtt Líf ehf.
- Release date: 4 September 1983
- Running time: 87 min
- Language: Icelandic

Nýtt Líf (English: New Life) is an Icelandic film directed by Þráinn Bertelsson and released in 1983. The film is a comedy shot in the Westman Islands and stars Eggert Þorleifsson and Karl Ágúst Úlfsson, among others. The music features several musicians including the band Tappi Tíkarrass (of which Björk was a member), which contributed the songs "Sperglar" and "Kukl" (a.k.a. "Seiður").

== Synopsis ==
The film is the first of three about the misadventures of two friends, Þór and Danni. Two friends working at a restaurant get fired from their jobs and after seeing an advertisement for the fishing industry of the Westman Islands, decide to go there and make some money. The islands become a perfect setting for many funny and strange situations, especially after word gets around that the two are spies from the Ministry of Fisheries.

== Cast ==
Karl Ágúst Úlfsson: Daníel Ólafsson.
Eggert Þorleifsson: Þór Magnússon.
Runólfur Dagbjartsson: Víglundur, work manager.
Eiríkur Sigurgeirsson: Axel, best employee.
Sveinn Tómasson: Ási, the shipper.
Guðrún Kolbeinsdóttir: María Víglundsdóttir.
Elva Ósk Ólafsdóttir: Miss Snæfells and Hnappadalssýsla.
Ingveldur Gyða Kristinsdóttir: Silja, Axels' girlfriend.
Magnús S. Magnússon: Sigurður mayonese.
Frímann Lúðvíksson: Júlli, the house keeper.
Hlynur Ólafsson: Alli, guest at the ball at Alþýðuhúsið.
Guðlaug Bjarnadóttir: Magga, Þór's ex-wife.
Tappi Tíkarrass (Björk Guðmundsdóttir - vocals. Jakob Smári Magnússon - bass. Eyjólfur Jóhannsson - guitar. Guðmundur Þór Gunnarsson).

== Reception ==
The film was the fourth highest-grossing film in Iceland in 1983 and the second highest-grossing local film after On Top.
