= On Top (film) =

1982 Icelandic film by Ágúst Guðmundsson

Með allt á hreinu (On Top)
- Directed by: Ágúst Guðmundsson
- Starring: Egill Ólafsson; Ragnhildur Gísladóttir; Valgeir Guðjónsson; Eggert Þorleifsson
- Release date: 1982
- Country: Iceland
- Language: Icelandic

On Top (Icelandic: Með allt á hreinu) is an Icelandic musical comedy from 1982, directed by Icelandic director Ágúst Guðmundsson. The film, which still enjoys widespread popularity in Iceland, tells the story of two bands (one all-male and one all-female) that go on a tour together and then become engaged in a rivalry.

The cast is composed members of the pop bands Stuðmenn (also the name of the band in the film) and Grýlurnar (Gærurnar in the film), and the film is largely based on performances by the two bands. According to Valgeir Guðjónsson the L.A. Times film critic reviewed the movie and started the review by saying "On Top features a bunch of Icelandic fruitcakes wearing strange clothes"

In 2026, a musical theatre version of the movie will be performed.

== Cast ==
- Egill Ólafsson
- Ragnhildur Gísladóttir
- Valgeir Guðjónsson
- Eggert Þorleifsson
- Jakob Frímann Magnússon
- Anna Björnsdóttir

== Reception ==
The film was the highest-grossing film in Iceland in 1983.
