= Ingólfshöfði =

Cape in Iceland

Coordinates: 63.80°N 16.64°W

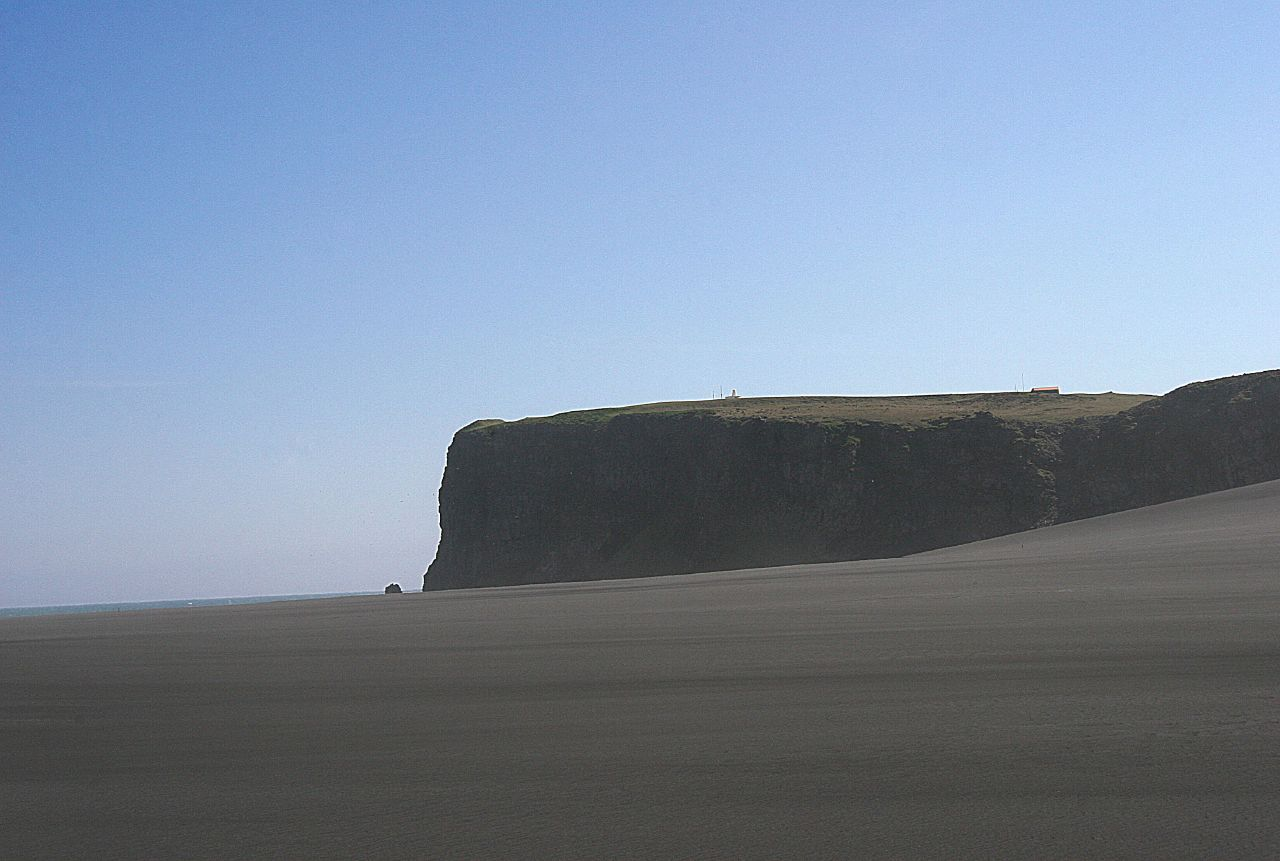
Ingolfshöfdi, Iceland

Ingólfshöfði (Icelandic pronunciation: [ˈiŋkoul(f)sˌhœvðɪ]) is a small headland and private nature reserve on the south coast of Iceland. It is believed to be the location where Ingólfur Arnarson originally landed in Iceland in or around 874 CE, and where he stayed the first winter and it is named after him as a result. Ingólfshöfði reaches a maximum elevation of 76 meters (249 ft).
