= Rúrik Theodór Haraldsson =

Icelandic actor

- Born: Rúrik Theodór Haraldsson; 20 July 1924; Vestmannaeyjar, Iceland
- Died: 23 January 2003 (aged 77); Reykjavík, Iceland
- Occupation: Actor

Rúrik Theodór Haraldsson (14 January 1926 – 23 January 2003) was an Icelandic actor, musician and voice actor.

Rurik studied acting in London at the Royal Central School of Speech and Drama between 1947 and 1950.

Rurik was active as musician as trumpeter in the Vestmannaeyjars trumpet chorus and he was later active in the band Bjarna Böðvarssonar between 1945 and 1946.

Rurik was as actor active both on stage and on television; he did over 150 roles at the National Theatre of Iceland. Rurik appeared on television in various productions, including In the Shadow of the Raven, Under the Glacier and Stella for Office. Rurik also worked as a voice actor in a couple of Icelandic dubs of Disney movies, such as Aladdin, The Jungle Book, and Sleeping Beauty.

Rurik married Anna Sæbjörnsdóttir in 1952 and was married to her until her death in 1998. They had six children together.

== Selected filmography ==
Sources:

- 1988: In the Shadow of the Raven
- 1989: Under the Glacier
- 1991: Children of Nature
- 1992: The Men's Choir
- 1993: Aladdin (voice in Icelandic dub)
- 1994: Movie Days
- 1999: The Honor of the House
- 2000: The Jungle Book (voice in Icelandic dub) (Note: Icelandic dub from 2000)
- 2002: Sleeping Beauty (voice in Icelandic dub) (Note: Icelandic dub from 2002)
- 2002: Stella for Office
