= Pálmi Gestsson =

Icelandic actor (born 1957)

- Born: 2 October 1957
- Occupation: Actor

Pálmi Gestsson (born 2 October 1957) is an Icelandic actor and voice actor. He is known for the long-running Icelandic sketch group Spaugstofan which he co-created. Among his voice acting is the Icelandic voice of Shere Khan in The Jungle Book.

== Early life ==
Pálmi was born in 1957 in Bolungarvík, the Westfjords, Iceland.

== Career ==
Pálmi graduated from the Icelandic Drama School in 1982. He has been working with the National Theatre of Iceland since 1983.

== Personal life ==
Pálmi is a nature lover and once walked up 52 mountains (1 per week) in a year in Iceland. He likes hunting birds and especially reindeer which is one of his favorite foods.

He is married to Sigurlaug Halldórsdóttir, a stewardess, and has 4 children.

== Selected filmography ==
=== Movies and TV-series ===
- Bíódagar (1994) as Truck Driver
- Benjamín Dúfa (1995) as Andrés's father
- Einglar Alheimsins (2000) as Vilhjálmur
- Njálssaga (2003) as Þráinn
- Afinn (2014) as Lárus
- Þrestir (2015) as Diddi
- Ófærð (2015-2016) (TV-series) as Hrafn Eysteinsson
- Agnes Joy (2019)
- Odd Fish (2023)

=== Icelandic dubbing ===
- Tom and Jerry: The Movie (1992) as Ferdinand
- The Swan Princess (1996) as Rothbart
- TaleSpin (1997) as Baloo
- Aristocats (2000) as Scat Cat
- The Jungle Book (2000) as Shere Khan
- Harry Potter and the Philosopher's Stone (2001) as Vernon Dursley
- Stuart Little 2 (2002) as The Evil Falcon
- Garfield (2004) as Happy Chapman
