= Stella í orlofi =

- Directed by: Þórhildur Þorleifsdóttir
- Written by: Guðný Halldórsdóttir
- Starring: Edda Björgvinsdóttir; Gestur Einar Jónasson; Laddi
- Edited by: Kristín Pálsdóttir; Valdís Óskarsdóttir (additional editor)
- Music by: Valgeir Guðjónsson
- Release date: October 18, 1986
- Country: Iceland
- Language: Icelandic

Stella í orlofi (English: Stella on Vacation) is a 1986 Icelandic comedy film directed by Þórhildur Þorleifsdóttir and written by Guðný Halldórsdóttir. It has enjoyed enduring popularity in Iceland, and was followed up with the sequel Stella í framboði in 2002.
