= Ragga Gísla =

Icelandic actress and musician

- Born: Guðmunda Ragnhildur Gísladóttir; October 7, 1956 (age 69); Iceland
- Occupations: Singer, composer, actress

Guðmunda Ragnhildur Gísladóttir, known as Ragga Gisla (born 7 October 1956), is an Icelandic actress and musician. She led the band Grýlurnar which appeared in a popular comedy film in the 1980s. She was knighted for her contribution to music.

== Life ==
Gísla was born in Iceland in 1956.

In 1981 she was in a band called Brimkló but she was not happy with the credit she was receiving. She decided to start a new group called Grýlurnar, which means "Icicles". This was a nickname they had heard the musician Pétur Kristjánsson use to refer to girls.

Dozens of girls replied to an advert for members of the new band, but those chosen were the guitarist Inga Rún Pálmadóttir, the drummer Linda Björk Hreiðarsdóttir and Herdísi Hallvarðsdóttir on bass. Gisla would play keyboards and be the band's lead.

Grýlurnar was to become one of the most well known girl bands. They released an eponymous album in 1981 ("the first Icelandic women's rock album") and in 1982 Gisla was voted as the best singer in the de facto national awards. The band appeared on TV is several Nordic countries, and they released a second album of original music.

The band starred in a popular Icelandic comedy film, On Top, under a similar name. Gisla was one of the stars. The film concerned the adventures of two bands touring Iceland.

The band lasted two years. Their best known song, "Sisi", was included in a number of compilations.

In 2004 Ágúst Guðmundsson made a sequel to his first film, called Ahead of Time. This was a comedy about a band planning a comeback.

In 2006, Gisla was one of the singers chosen as "European Divas" to appear at the annual Frostroses concert in Rekyavik. The others included Sissel Kyrkjebø, Eivør Pálsdóttir from the Faroe Islands, Petula Clark and Patricia Bardon from Ireland. The concert was televised and there was an album of the songs.

In 2008 Gisla graduated with a degree in composition from the Iceland Academy of the Arts, and in 2013 she gained a master's degree.

In 2012 she was one of eleven people who were made knights of the Falcon by the country's president.

During the semi-finals for the Iceland in the Eurovision Song Contest 2023, she was one of the entertainers who supplemented the singing by the contestants. The others were Unnsteinn Manuel Stefánsson, Guðlaug Sóley Höskuldsdóttir, and Sveinbjörn Thorarensen.

Reykjavík's 28th annual Culture Night was on August 19, 2023. Gisla closed the concert with GDRN, Valdimar and Mugison.
