= Laddi =

Icelandic comedian and actor (born 1947)

- Born: Þórhallur Sigurðsson; 20 January 1947 (age 79); Hafnarfjörður, Iceland
- Other name: Laddi
- Occupations: Comedian; actor; voice actor; entertainer
- Years active: 1970–present

Þórhallur Sigurðsson (born 20 January 1947), best known as Laddi, is an Icelandic comedian, actor, voice actor and entertainer known for comedy music and comedy acting. Laddi has dubbed many characters into Icelandic, in films and TV shows like The Smurfs and feature films like Aladdin.

He started off in a comedy duo with his brother Haraldur Sigurðsson, they were known as "Halli og Laddi" - Halli and Laddi.

He was in the music video "Triumph of a Heart" with Björk.

== Selected filmography ==
=== Movies ===
- 1971: Hvað býr í blýhólknum
- 1980: The Fishing Trip
- 1983: Who Is... ? - Sveinn
- 1984: Golden Sands - Band Leader
- 1985: Cool Jazz and Coconuts - Karl
- 1985: A Policeman's Life - Hilmar vatnsveitumaður
- 1986: Stella on Holiday - Salomon
- 1989: Under the Glacier - Jódínus Álfberg
- 1989: Magnús - Theódór Ólafsson
- 1992: Ingaló - Landsambandsmaður 2
- 1992: The Men's Choir - Jón
- 1995: Privacy - Sigurður aðstoðarvarðstjóri
- 2000: The Icelandic Dream - Shop Owner
- 2000: Ikíngut - Þjónn Sýslumanns
- 2001: Regína - Jordan
- 2002: Stella for Office - Salomon
- 2008: Black Angels - Geir
- 2009: Jóhannes - Jóhannes
- 2009: Mr. Bjarnfreðarson - Skólastjóri
- 2011: Stormland - Keli
- 2011: Our Own Oslo - Havel
- 2011: Ravens, Buttercups and Myrrh - Kiddi
- 2012: Black's Game - Shop Owner
- 2013: Spook's and Spirits - Ófeigur
- 2013: The Secret Life of Walter Mitty - Trawler Captain
- 2014: Harry & Heimir: The First Time It Is Murder - Símon
- 2020: Grandma Hófí

=== TV-Series ===
- 1976-2020: The New Year's Lampoon
- 1977: Under the Same Roof
- 1986: Heilsubælið - Various characters
- 2010: Hæ gosi
- 2020: My Funeral - Benedikt

=== Icelandic dubbing ===
Sources:

- 1981: The Smurfs - All voices
- 1992: Tom & Jerry: The Movie - Lickboot
- 1993: Aladdin - Genie
- 1994: Rock-A-Doodle - Grand Duke, Pinky and Stuey
- 1994: Thumbelina - Jacquimo
- 1994: The Lion King - Timon
- 1995: Lady and the Tramp - Beaver
- 1997: Hercules - Pain and Hermes
- 1997: Space Jam - Bill Murray
- 1998: The Pinchcliffe Grand Prix - Ben Redic Fy Fazan
- 1998: A Bug's Life - Molt and Cornelius
- 1998: Mulan - Mushu
- 1999: Toy Story 2 - Wheezy and Emperor Zurg
- 1999: Asterix and Obelix vs. Caesar - Asterix
- 2000: Help! I'm a Fish - Professor F.O. McKrill
- 2001: Atlantis: The Lost Empire - Cookie
- 2001: Shrek - Donkey
- 2002: Lilo & Stitch - Pleakley
- 2002: Treasure Planet - B.E.N.
- 2003: Finding Nemo - Gurgle
- 2003: Brother Bear - Rutt
- 2004: Home on the Range - Lucky Jack
- 2005: Robots - Fender
- 2005: Madagascar - King Julien
- 2006: Cars - Mater
- 2009: The Princess and the Frog - Ray
- 2010: Toy Story 3 - Lotso
- 2012: Wreck-It Ralph - King Candy
- 2013: Frozen - Duke of Weselton
- 2016: Ice Age: Collision Course - Teddy
- 2016: Zootopia - Duke Weaselton
- 2017: Coco - Tío Oscar and Tío Felipe
- 2018: Incredibles 2 - Gus Burns/Reflux
- 2023: The Super Mario Bros. Movie - Cranky Kong
