= Nuestra Belleza México 1999 =

6th edition of Nuestra Belleza México beauty pageant

- Date: September 12, 1999
- Presenters: Marco Antonio Regil, Lupita Jones
- Venue: Lienzo Charro "Cuna de la Charrería", Pachuca, Hidalgo, Mexico
- Broadcaster: Televisa
- Entrants: 32
- Placements: 10
- Winner: Leticia Murray; Sonora

Nuestra Belleza México 1999, the 6th Nuestra Belleza México beauty pageant, was held at Lienzo Charro "Cuna de la Charrería" in Pachuca, Hidalgo, Mexico on September 12, 1999. Thirty-two contestants of the Mexican Republic competed for the national title, which was won by Leticia Murray from Sonora, who later competed at Miss Universe 2000 in Cyprus. Murray was crowned by outgoing Nuestra Belleza México titleholder Silvia Salgado. She is the second blonde and only Sonorense to win this title.

The Nuestra Belleza Mundo México title was won by Danette Velasco from Distrito Federal, who later competed at Miss World 1999 in the United Kingdom. Velasco was crowned by outgoing Nuestra Belleza Mundo México titleholder Vilma Zamora. She was the first Capitalina to win this title.

This year the Nuestra Belleza México Organization obtained the Miss International pageant franchise and Lynette Delgado from Sinaloa won the Nuestra Belleza Internacional México title (Miss Dorian Grey). She would have competed in Miss International 1999 in Japan but she resigned the title days after. She was the first Sinaloense to win this title. Graciela Soto from Morelos was her replacement in the Miss International 1999 pageant, becoming the first Morelense to win this title.

Leticia Murray from Sonora was designated by the Nuestra Belleza México Organization as Nuestra Belleza Internacional México 2000 and competed in Miss International 2000 in Japan where she was a Semi-finalist in the Top 15. She was the first Sonorense to win this Title.

== Results ==
=== Placements ===
Final results	Contestant
Nuestra Belleza México 1999	Sonora – Leticia Murray
Nuestra Belleza Mundo México 1999	(Mexico City) Distrito Federal – Danette Velasco
Suplente/1st Runner-up (Nuestra Belleza Internacional México 1999)	Sinaloa – Lynette Delgado (Resigned)
2nd Runner-up (After successor as Nuestra Belleza Internacional México 1999)	Morelos – Graciela Soto (Successor)
3rd Runner-up	Tamaulipas – Rosa María Aragón
Top 10	Aguascalientes – Yvette Roque; Baja California Sur – Clara Sández; (Chihuahua (state)) Chihuahua – Mónica Enríquez; Guanajuato – María Espinosa; Nuevo León – Vanessa Valle

=== Order of announcements ===
==== Top 10 ====
1. Aguascalientes
2. Baja California Sur
3. Chihuahua
4. Distrito Federal
5. Guanajuato
6. Morelos
7. Nuevo León
8. Sinaloa
9. Sonora
10. Tamaulipas

==== Top 5 ====
1. Distrito Federal
2. Morelos
3. Sinaloa
4. Sonora
5. Tamaulipas

=== Special awards ===
Award	Contestant
Miss Photogenic	Sinaloa – Lynette Delgado
Miss Personality	Sinaloa – Lynette Delgado
Miss Dorian Grey	Sinaloa – Lynette Delgado
Best Hair	Tamaulipas – Rosa María Aragón
Skin Hinds	Tamaulipas – Rosa María Aragón
Best National Costume	Campeche – Jocelyn Selem Trueba; "Teocintle, Diosa del maíz"

== National costume competition ==
In this competition the contestants are not evaluated, only the costumes. It is a competition showing the country's wealth embodied in the colorful and fascinating costumes made by Mexican designers that combine the past and present of Mexico.

This event elects which costume will represent Mexico in the Miss Universe contest the next year. Some costumes are also selected to represent Mexico in other beauty contests.

The winning costume designer receives the "Aguja Diamante Award".

Final results	Contestant
Winner	Campeche – "Teocentli, El Maíz"
Top 10	Baja California – "Coyoehauxtli"; Chiapas – "Diosa Prehispánica"; Guanajuato – "Xochiquetzalli"; Jalisco – "Charra de Gala Cachiruleado"; Nayarit – "Rurabe"; Oaxaca – "Flor de Piña"; Quintana Roo – "Princesa Caribeña"; Tabasco – "Mariposa Monarca"; Tamaulipas – "Regina"

- Aguascalientes – "Catrina"
- Baja California – "Coyoehauxtli"
- Baja California Sur – "Reina Calafia"
- Campeche – "Teocentli, El Maíz" (Best National Costume in Miss Universe 2000)
- Coahuila – "Kikapú"
- Colima – "Princesa Azteca"
- Chiapas – "Diosa Prehispánica"
- Chihuahua – "Frutos de la Tierra"
- (Mexico City) Distrito Federal – "Princesa Maya"
- Durango – "Durango Mágico"
- (State of Mexico) Estado de México – "Quihuicolo"
- Guanajuato – "Xochiquetzalli"
- Guerrero – "Pai-Pai"
- Hidalgo – "La Mujer del Valle"
- Jalisco – "Charra de Gala Cachiruleado"
- Michoacán – "Ceremonial de Michoacán"
- Morelos – "La Hermosa Doncella de Xóchitl"
- Nayarit – "Rurabe"
- Nuevo León – "Paz Mexicana"
- Oaxaca – "Flor de Piña"
- Puebla – "China Poblana de Gala"
- Querétaro – "Aldeano"
- Quintana Roo – "Princesa Caribeña"
- San Luis Potosí – "Orígenes de Grandeza"
- Sinaloa – "Realeza Mexicana"
- Sonora – "Raíces Sonorenses"
- Tabasco – "Mariposa Monarca"
- Tamaulipas – "Regina"
- Tlaxcala – "Huapango"
- Yucatán – "Sinfonía Marina"
- Veracruz – "Princesa Maya"
- Zacatecas – "Zacatecas Tierra Fértil"

== Judges ==
- Joss-Claude – Stylist
- Montserrat Olivier – Actress, TV Presenter & Model
- Rodolfo Cavalcani – Employer
- Beatríz Calles – Designer
- Juan José Origel – Journalist & TV Host
- Maxine Woodside – Journalist
- Luz María Zetina – Nuestra Belleza México 1994 & Actress
- Nicole Roxin – Photographer
- Gabriel Soto – El Modelo México 1996, Actor & Singer

== Contestants ==
State	Contestant	Age	Height (m)
Aguascalientes	Yvette Jasmine Roque Ruvalcaba	23	1.74
Baja California	Astrid Rosalia Chávez Ramírez	21	1.73
Baja California Sur	Clara Sández Avilés	21	1.80
Campeche	Jocelyn Selem Trueba	20	1.70
Colima	Marcela Bueno Reyes	21	1.68
Chiapas	Mabell Ortíz Gómez	20	1.70
(Chihuahua (state)) Chihuahua	Mónica Enríquez Rodríguez	20	1.73
(Mexico City) Distrito Federal	Danette Velasco Bataller	21	1.78
Durango	Verónica Selene Garza Gamero	20	1.77
(State of Mexico) Estado de México	Itzanami Bermúdez Sánchez	22	1.70
Guanajuato	María Esther Espinoza Martínez	20	1.74
Guerrero	Alejandra López Duchesneau	21	1.72
(Hidalgo (state)) Hidalgo	Monserrat Jaime Flores	20	1.68
Jalisco	María Pía Marín Gutiérrez	21	1.73
Michoacán	María Elena Duarte Ramírez	23	1.76
Morelos	Graciela Soto Cámara	22	1.78
Nayarit	Bertha Guadalupe Tirado Espinoza	20	1.72
Nuevo León	Vannessa María Valle Yves	21	1.74
Oaxaca	Elsa Aguilar del Puerto	20	1.71
Puebla	Aurora Lemini Hernández	20	1.69
Querétaro	Ericka Thomas Minutti	22	1.72
Quintana Roo	Valeria De Anda González	23	1.72
San Luis Potosí	Ana María Iglesias Nuñez	21	1.69
Sinaloa	Lynette Delgado Gastélum	22	1.73
Sonora	Leticia Judith Murray Acedo	20	1.80
Tabasco	Ana Marina Valenzuela Riveroll	20	1.69
Tamaulipas	Rosa María Aragón Herrera	22	1.73
Tlaxcala	Ricarda Ramírez Mejía	20	1.74
Veracruz	Karla Delgado Hernández	20	1.72
[[Yucatán|]] Yucatán	Katty Mirlé Risueño Coello	20	1.80
Zacatecas	Sayra Guadalupe Llamas Mojarro	20	1.74

== Significance ==
- Sonora won the Nuestra Belleza México title for the first time.
- This year the crown of Nuestra Belleza México suffers his second change, this new model would continue until 2005.
- Distrito Federal won the Nuestra Belleza Mundo México title for the first time.
- Sinaloa was the Suplente/1st Runner-up and won the Nuestra Belleza Internacional México title for the first time.
- For the first time a Titleholder resigned to the title (Lynette Delgado, Nuestra Belleza Internacional México 1999).
- Morelos was appointed as Nuestra Belleza Internacional México after the resignation of Lynette Delgado from Sinaloa.
- This year, the organization welcomed the entry into a new millennium with the second Official Anthem of the pageant, which was interpreted by the 32 participants at the opening of the contest; also this year the organization made a special event called "Nuestra Belleza México Milenio".
- For the first time an Afro-Mexican competed in the Nuestra Belleza México pageant (Elsa Aguilar from Oaxaca).
- Jalisco wasn't called to the semi-finals after it had been doing since 1994.
- Baja California Sur was called to the semi-finals for the first time.
- Distrito Federal and Nuevo León placed for sixth consecutive year.
- Guanajuato placed for third consecutive year.
- Chihuahua placed for second consecutive year.
- Aguascalientes, Morelos, Sinaloa and Tamaulipas returned to making calls to the semi-finals after two years (1997) while Sonora after three years (1996).
- States that were called to the semi-finals last year and this year failed to qualify were Coahuila, Jalisco, Nayarit, Puebla, Quintana Roo, Tabasco and Yucatán.
- Marco Antonio Regil hosted the pageant for second consecutive time with Lupita Jones.
- Sinaloa won Miss Photogenic, Miss Personality and Miss Dorian Grey awards for the first time.
- Tamaulipas won the Best Hair Award for the first time and the Skin Hinds award for second time after three years (1996).
- Campeche won the Best Regional Costume for the first time.
- The host delegate, Monserrat Jaime from Hidalgo, failed to place in the semi-finals.
- Baja California Sur (Clara Sández), Sonora (Leticia Murray) and Yucatán (Katty Risueño) are the higher delegates in this edition (1.78 m).
- Campeche Jocelyn Selem), Colima (Marcela Bueno), Estado de México (Itzanami Bermudez), Hidalgo (Monserrat Jaime), Puebla (Aurora Lamini), Quintana Roo (Valeria de Anda), San Luis Potosí (Ana María Iglesias) and Tabasco (Ana Marina Valenzuela) are the lower delegates in this edition (1.68 m).

== Contestant notes ==
- (Mexico City) Distrito Federal – Danette Velasco represented the country in Miss World 1999 held at Olympia Hall in London, England on December 4, 1999, but she didn't place.
- Morelos – Graciela Soto was selected by Lupita Jones to represent Mexico in Miss International 1999 held at the U-Port Hall, Tokyo, Japan on December 14, 1999, but She didn't place. After having won the franchise of that competition to the contest brother Señorita México although it only lasted two years (1999 & 2000).
- Oaxaca – Elsa Aguilar is sister of Ángeles Aguilar Nuestra Belleza Oaxaca 2008, as well as the daughter of Agustin Aguilar Roca, who was Mr. Oaxaca in 1972, as well as Ángeles del Puerto Muñoz, who represented Oaxaca in Señorita Mexico in 1968. She is the State Sub-Director of Nuestra Belleza Oaxaca. Aguilar was the first Afro-Mexican to compete in the Nuestra Belleza México pageant.
- Sinaloa – Lynette Delgado won the right to represent Mexico in Miss International 1999 but she resigned to the title. Much has been said that it was a nerve that Lynette remain as Suplente/1st Runner-up, being that she was considered the most beautiful of the 5 finalists to go to one of the two major pageants, so Lynette renounced the title and she was replaced by the 2nd Runner-up Graciela Soto.
- Sonora – Leticia Murray competed in Miss Universe 2000 held at Eleftheria Stadium in Nicosia, Cyprus and won two awards: Best National Costume and Clairol Style, although she failed to place in the semifinals. She was also selected to compete in Miss International 2000 held at the Koseinenkin Hall in Tokyo, Japan on October 14, 2000, where she was called to the semi-finalists.
- Tamaulipas – Rosa María Aragón is sister of Mónica Aragón, Nuestra Belleza Tamaulipas 2001.
- Quintana Roo – Valeria De Anda competed in Miss Costa Maya International 2000.

=== Crossovers ===
Contestants who had competed or will compete at other beauty pageants:

Miss Universe

- 2000: Sonora: Leticia Murray

Miss World

- 1999: (Mexico City) Distrito Federal: Danette Velasco

Miss International

- 1999: Morelos: Graciela Soto
- 2000: Sonora: Leticia Murray (Top 15)

Miss Costa Maya International

- 2000: Quintana Roo: Valeria De Anda
