= Mexicana Universal Sonora =

Beauty contest

- Formation: 1994 (as Nuestra Belleza Sonora); 2017 (as Mexicana Universal Sonora)
- Type: Beauty pageant
- Headquarters: Hermosillo
- Location: Mexico
- Local coordinator: Héctor Huerta

Mexicana Universal Sonora (until 2016 called Nuestra Belleza Sonora) is a state-level contest in the state of Sonora, Mexico, which selects the state representative for the national contest Mexicana Universal (formerly called Nuestra Belleza México), thus aspiring to represent the country internationally on one of the platforms offered.

The state organization has achieved the following results since 1994:

- Winner: 3 (1999, 2014, 2021)
- 1st Runner-up: 3 (1995, 2013, 2015)
- 2nd Runner-up: 4 (2000, 2001, 2002, 2015)
- Top 10/11/12: 9 (2001, 2002, 2003, 2007, 2009, 2010, 2011, 2016, 2019)
- Top 15/16: 4 (1994, 1996, 2006, 2022)
- Top 20/21: 3 (2001, 2003, 2004)
- Unplaced: 17 (1997, 1998, 2002, 2005, 2010, 2012 2017, 2018, 2023)
- Absences: (2025)

== National Queens ==
- Irma Miranda - Mexicana Universal 2022
- Yamelin Ramírez - Nuestra Belleza Mundo México 2014
- Vanessa López - Reina Hispanoamericana México 2014 (Designated)
- Cecilia Montaño - Miss Continente Americano México 2011 (Designated)
- Melissa Estrella - Reina Hispanoamericana México 2007 (Designated)
- Erika Honstein - Nuestra Belleza Mundo México 2003
- Carmen Félix - Reina del Café México 2003 (Designated)
- Leticia Murray - Nuestra Belleza Internacional México 2000 (Designated)
- Leticia Murray - Nuestra Belleza México 1999

== International Queens ==
- Vanessa López - Virreina Hispanoamericana 2014

== Titleholders ==
The following are the names of the annual winners of Mexicana Universal Sonora, listed in ascending order, as well as their results during the national Mexicana Universal pageant. State queens who represented the country in a current or past franchise of the national organization are also highlighted in a specific color.

Current Franchises:

- Competed at Miss Grand International.
- Competed at Miss International.
- Competed at Miss Charm.
- Competed at Reina Hispanoamericana.
- Competed at Miss Orb International.
- Competed at Nuestra Latinoamericana Universal.

Former Franchises:

- Competed at Miss Universe.
- Competed at Miss World.
- Competed at Miss Continente Americano.
- Competed at Miss Costa Maya International.
- Competed at Miss Atlántico Internacional.
- Competed at Miss Verano Viña del Mar.
- Competed at Reina Internacional del Café.
- Competed at Reina Internacional de las Flores.
- Competed at Señorita Continente Americano.
- Competed at Nuestra Belleza Internacional.

Year	Titleholder	Hometown	Placement	Special Award	Notes
2025	No candidate was sent				
2024	In 2024, due to changes in the dates of the national pageant, the election of the state queens was postponed for one year.				
2023	Gabriela Valverde Muñoz; Resigned from her state title due to the postponement of the national pageant.	Hermosillo	Did not Compete	-	-
2023	Andrea Cebreros Yocupicio (Assumed)	Huatabampo	-	-	Competed at Mexicana Universal Sonora 2022; Mexicana Universal Navojoa 2022; Reina Turismo Sonora 2017; Top 10 at Rostro de México 2015; Miss Grand Sonora 2015
2022	Mariela Alemar Morales Alcaraz (Resigned)	Puerto Peñasco	Did not Compete	-	-
2022	Coralia Vega Jiménez (Assumed)	Ciudad Obregón	Top 16	-	1st Runner-up at Mexicana Universal Sonora 2022
2021	Irma Cristina Miranda Valenzuela	Ciudad Obregón	Mexicana Universal	-	Competed at Miss Universe 2022; 1st Runner-up at Nuestra Belleza México 2016; Nuestra Belleza Sonora 2015; Nuestra Belleza Cajeme 2015
2020	In 2020, due to the contingency of COVID-19 there was a lag in the year of the state contest				
2019	Karla Idolina Ochoa Gutiérrez	Hermosillo	Top 10	-	Mexicana Universal Hermosillo 2019
2018	Marcela Castillo Orduño	Hermosillo	-	-	Teen Globe México 2017; Teen Globe Sonora 2017
2017	Brenda Janeth Vargas Romero	Hermosillo	-	-	Mexicana Universal Hermosillo 2017
Until 2016 the Title was Nuestra Belleza Sonora
2016	María José Antillón Mayorga	Ciudad Obregón	Top 10	Personality Fraiche	Miss Earth Sonora 2018; Nuestra Belleza Cajeme 2016
2015	Irma Cristina Miranda Valenzuela	Ciudad Obregón	1st Runner-up	Miss Sports	Competed at Miss Universe 2022; Mexicana Universal 2022; Mexicana Universal Sonora 2021; Nuestra Belleza Cajeme 2015
2014	Yamelin Ramírez Cota	Navojoa	Nuestra Belleza Mundo México	-	Competed at Miss World 2015; Yareli Ramírez's sister, Miss Supranational México 2010
2013	Vanessa López Quijada	Nogales	1st Runner-up	-	Top 12 at Miss Supranational 2023; Miss México Supranational 2023; Top 8 at Miss México Elite 2023; Miss Sonora 2021; Competed at Miss F1 México 2015; Nuestra Belleza Nogales 2013; Virreina Hispanoamericana 2014; Reina Hispanoamericana México 2014; 1st Runner-up at Nuestra Belleza Mundo México 2013
2012	Gabriela Saldívar Preciado	Ciudad Obregón	-	-	Nuestra Belleza Cajeme 2012
2011	Laura Palacio Núñez	Puerto Peñasco	Top 10	-	Nuestra Belleza Puerto Peñasco 2011; Miss Earth Sonora 2011; Elizabeth Palacio's sister, Nuestra Belleza Sonora 2002
2010	Erika Bernal López	Hermosillo	-	-	-
2009	Lorena Camargo Miranda	Ciudad Obregón	Top 10	-	Nuestra Belleza Cajeme 2009
2008	Blanca Cecilia Montaño Moreno	Hermosillo	2nd Runner-up	-	1st Runner-up at Miss Continente Americano 2011; Miss Continente Americano México 2011
2007	Carla Denise Cardona González	Cananea	Top 10	Steps to Fame	-
2006	Melissa Estrella Pérez	Nogales	Top 15	-	Competed at Reina Hispanoamericana 2007; Reina Hispanoamericana 2007
2005	Jazmín Hurtado Parker	Hermosillo	-	-	-
2004	Carolina Karam Báez	Huatabampo	Top 20	Miss Congeniality	-
2003	Laura Almada Ibarra	Navojoa	Top 20	-	-
2002	Elizabeth Palacio Núñez	Puerto Peñasco	-	-	Laura Palacio's sister, Nuestra Belleza Sonora 2011
2001	Erika Peña Ramírez	Hermosillo	Top 10	-	Queen Maya World 2001; Qeen Mayan World México 2001; Top 21 at Nuestra Belleza Mundo México 2001
2000	Ana Lourdes Astiazarán Nieves	Hermosillo	2nd Runner-up	Miss Photogenic; Edoardos Model	Top 20 at Nuestra Belleza Mundo México 2000
1999	Leticia Judith Murray Acedo	Hermosillo	Nuestra Belleza México	-	Top 15 at Miss International 2000; Nuestra Belleza Internacional México 2000; Competed at Miss Universe 2000
1998	Lina Mercedes Samaniego Jiménez	Agua Prieta	-	-	-
1997	Ana Laura Bernal Camarena	Ciudad Obregón	-	-	-
1996	Mirna Irene Miranda Torres	Nogales	Top 16	-	-
1995	Lourdes Guadalupe Portela Peñúñuri	Ciudad Obregón	1st Runner-up	-	-
1994	Abigaíl Kuñasich Gamero	Hermosillo	Top 16	-	-

== Designated Contestants ==
Starting in 2000, states were allowed to have more than one candidate, as some states were not sending candidates for various reasons. The following contestants from Sonora were invited to compete in the national pageant alongside the reigning queen, and in some cases, they achieved even better results.

Year	Titleholder	Hometown	Placement	Special Award	Notes
2019	Nathalia Martínez Vázquez	Guaymas	-	-	1st Runner-up at Mexicana Universal Sonora 2019
2014	Tania Ung Ortiz	Hermosillo	Did not Compete	-	1st Runner-up at Nuestra Belleza Sonora 2014
2013	Clarisa Lucía Sandoval Valenzuela	Navojoa	-	-	Competed at Miss F1 México 2015; 1st Runner-up at Nuestra Belleza Sonora 2013; Nuestra Belleza Navojoa 2013
2011	Paulina Burrola Morales	Hermosillo	Top 10	-	Competed at Nuestra Belleza Sonora 2011
2010	Jessica María Lerma Palomares	Huatabampo	Top 10	Miss Top Model	2nd Runner-up at Reina Mundial del Banano 2014; Reina del Banano México 2014; 1st Runner-up at Nuestra Belleza Sonora 2010
2009	Gabriela Bórquez Lacy	Ciudad Obregón	-	-	1st Runner-up at Nuestra Belleza Sonora 2009
2008	Stephanie Diaz Castro	Cananea	-	-	1st Runner-up at Nuestra Belleza Sonora 2008
2007	Lydia Bernal Liñán	Hermosillo	-	-	Runner-up at Nuestra Belleza Sonora 2007
2007	Nilza Domínguez Aguayo	Hermosillo	-	-	Runner-up at Nuestra Belleza Sonora 2007
2005	Ana Patricia González Montes	Navojoa	-	-	Nuestra Belleza Latina 2010; 1st Runner-up at Nuestra Belleza Sonora 2005; Nuestra Belleza Navojoa 2005
2004	Alexia Vázquez Verduzco	Hermosillo	-	-	1st Runner-up at Nuestra Belleza Sonora 2004
2003	Amanda Castillo López	Hermosillo	Top 10	-	1st Runner-up at Nuestra Belleza Sonora 2003
2002	Erika Lizeth Honstein García	Hermosillo	2nd Runner-up	-	2nd Runner-up at Miss Mesoamérica International 2003; Miss Mesoamérica México 2003; Competed at Miss World 2003; Nuestra Belleza Mundo México 2003; Runner-up at Nuestra Belleza Sonora 2002
2002	María del Carmen Félix Espinoza	Hermosillo	Top 12	-	Competed in Reinado Internacional del Café 2003; Reina del Café México 2003; Runner-up at Nuestra Belleza Sonora 2002
2001	Carmen Valera Leyva	Ciudad Obregón	2nd Runner-up	-	Top 21 at Nuetsra Belleza Mundo México 2001; Runner-up at Nuestra Belleza Sonora 2001
2001	Lizeth Pérez Rodarte	Guaymas	Top 20	-	Top 21 at Nuetsra Belleza Mundo México 2001; Runner-up at Nuestra Belleza Sonora 2001
2000	Karla Jazmín Arias Amarillas	Ciudad Obregón	-	-	-
2000	Rubi López Ureña	Nogales	-	-	-

== See also ==
- Miss Sonora
