= Lynette Delgado =

Mexican model

- Born: Lynette Delgado Gastelúm; Sinaloa
- Other name: Lynette Delgado
- Beauty pageant titleholder
- Title: Nuestra Belleza Int'l México 1999 (Resigned)
- Major competitions: Nuestra Belleza México 1999 (1st runner-up) (Nuestra Belleza Int'l México 1999) (Resigned); Miss International 1999 (Did not Compete)

Lynette Delgado is a Mexican model who represented her State in Nuestra Belleza México 1999.

== Nuestra Belleza Mexico ==
Born in Sinaloa and raised in Los Mochis, Delgado competed against thirty-two other contestants for the national beauty title of Mexico, Nuestra Belleza México, held in Pachuca, Hidalgo in September 1999.

== Miss International 1999 ==
Despite not winning her country's national title, she was chosen to represent Mexico in the 1999 Miss International pageant, held on 14 December 1999 at Tokyo's U-Port Hall, after winning the Miss Dorian Grey Title. But she resigned to the title. Much has been said that it was a nerve that Lynette remain as Suplente/1st Runner-up, being that she was considered the most beautiful of the 5 finalists to go to one of the two major pageants, so Lynette renounced the title and she was replaced by the 2nd Runner-up Graciela Soto.

Awards and achievements
Preceded by	Nuestra Belleza Internacional México; 1999	Succeeded by Graciela Soto
