= Sirry Steffen =

Icelandic actress (1938–2020)

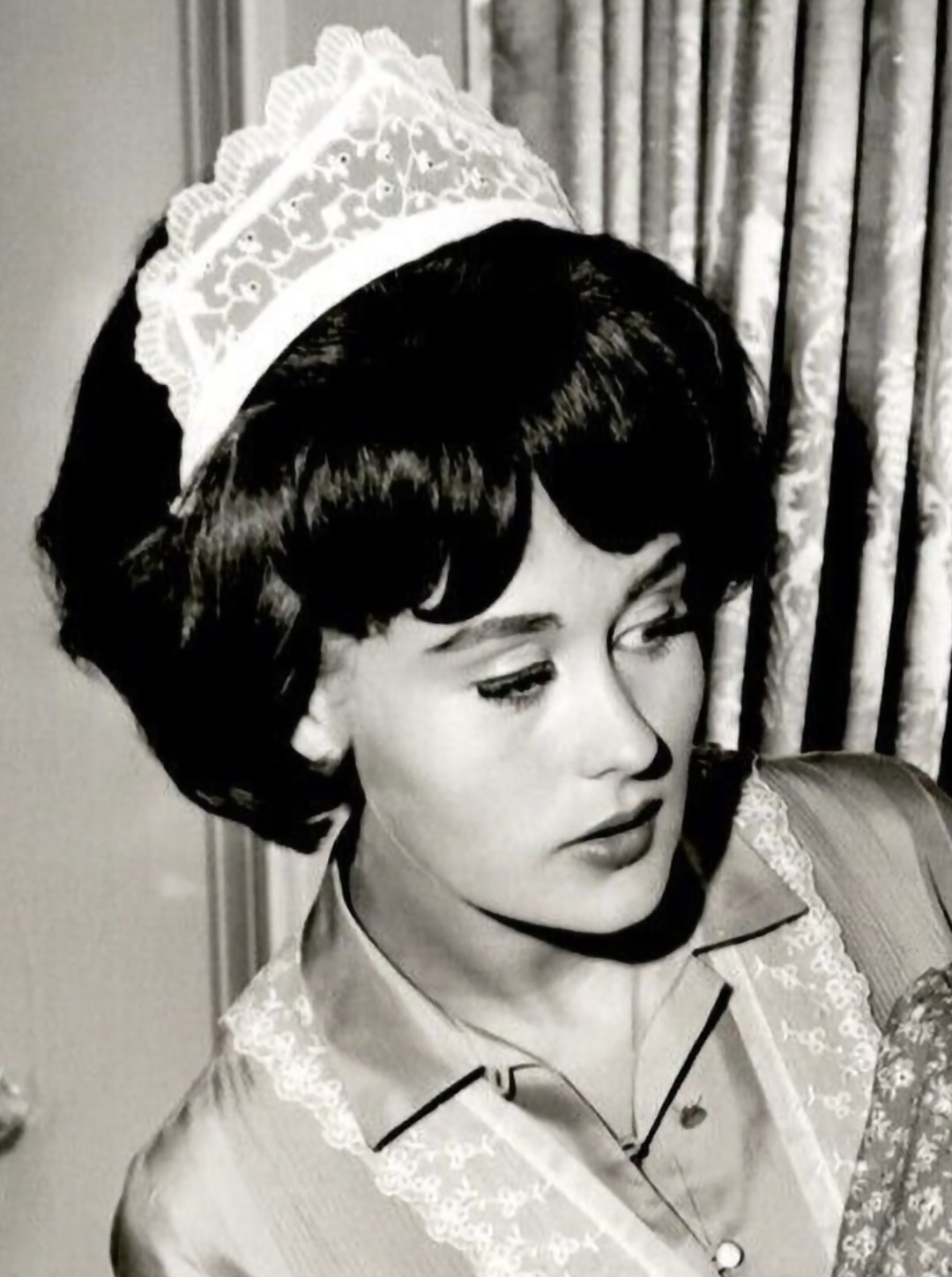
- Steffen in The Beverly Hillbillies, 1962
- Born: Sigríður Geirsdóttir; 29 May 1938; Iceland
- Died: 1 February 2020 (aged 81); Selfoss, Iceland
- Occupations: Actress, television personality
- Years active: 1959–1982

Sigríður Geirsdóttir (anglicized as Sigridur Geirsdottir; 29 May 1938 – 1 February 2020) was an Icelandic actress, model and beauty pageant titleholder who was crowned Miss Iceland 1959. She also appeared in American television series and movies as Sirry Steffen in the 1960s.

== Pageant career ==
She won the Miss Iceland contest in 1959. In August 1960, she competed against fifty-one other national winners in the very first Miss International 1960 contest, held at the Veteran's Memorial Coliseum in Long Beach, California. She received the title Miss Photogenic, and finished as 2nd runner-up, behind 1st runner-up Miss India, and winner Miss Colombia (now the Philippines' prestigious Binibining Pilipinas national director Stella Márquez-Araneta).

== Television career ==
Her best known role was as Mrs. Drysdale's maid Marie, in three 1962 episodes of The Beverly Hillbillies.

Her first television role was as Miss Iceland in the 1960 private-eye series Michael Shayne, starring Richard Denning, in the episode Death Selects the Winner, broadcast December 23, 1960.

She appeared as "French Girl" in The Old Magic episode of The Tom Ewell Show, broadcast March 14, 1961.

== Film career ==
In Hollywood, her first film role was a minor one in the 1962 film Hitler, starring Richard Basehart in the title role. She had a major role in the 1963 horror film The Crawling Hand, as Marta Farnstrom, the Swedish exchange-student girlfriend of the young man possessed by "The Crawling Hand". In promotional materials for the film, she was billed as "Introducing The 'Sex Iceberg' Sirry Steffen."

She had an uncredited role as "Party Girl" in the 1964 film Bedtime Story, starring Marlon Brando and David Niven.

In 1982, she had a major role credited to her Icelandic name in the film Okkar á milli: Í hita og þunga dagsins (Inter Nos), a change-of-pace film created by Iceland's famous Viking-film director Hrafn Gunnlaugsson about a man's mid-life crisis.

Year	Title	Role	Notes
1962	Hitler	Anna	
1963	The Crawling Hand	Marta Farnstrom	
1964	Bedtime Story	Party Girl	Uncredited
1982	Okkar á milli: Í hita og þunga dagsins (Inter Nos)		Final film role

== Personal life ==
Sigriður Geirsdóttir was born May 29, 1938, in Iceland. After finishing Menntaskólinn í Reykjavík (Reykjavík Junior College) in 1958, she studied French and Swedish at The University of Iceland (Háskóli Islands), also in Reykjavík, after which she became Miss Iceland (Ungfrú Ísland]. In 1960, she competed in the Miss International competition, and traveled the world as part of the entourage representing the pageant. She moved to California in the last few months of 1960 to embark on her television and film career, but moved back to Iceland in the mid-1960s. She was married twice. Her first husband was Þorkell Valdimarsson; they divorced. Her second husband was Stefán Bjarnason. She re-entered the film world with her 1982 role in the Icelandic film mentioned above. She lived for the rest of her life in Iceland.
