= Miss Sonora =

Beauty pageant in Sonora, Mexico

- Formation: 2016
- Type: Beauty pageant
- Headquarters: Mexico City
- Location: Mexico
- Local Coordinator: Clara Félix

Miss Sonora is a state-level contest in the state of Sonora, Mexico, which selects the state representative for the national contest Miss México, thus aspiring to represent the country internationally on one of the platforms offered.

The state organization has achieved the following results since 2016:

- Winner: 1 (2021)
- Top 5/6: 1 (2019)
- Top 10/11: 1 (2016)
- Top 16: 3 (2017, 2018, 2023)
- Unplaced: 1 (2025)

== National Queens ==
- Vanessa López - Miss México Supranational 2023
- Ayram Ortiz - Miss México Continentes Unidos 2022 (Designated)
- Norhely Celaya - Miss México Top Model of the World 2017 (Designated)

== Titleholders ==
The following are the names of the annual winners of Miss Sonora, listed in ascending order, as well as their results during the national Miss México pageant. State queens who represented the country in a current or past franchise of the national organization are also highlighted in a specific color.

Current Franchises:

- Competed at Miss World.
- Competed at Miss Supranational.
- Competed at Miss Cosmo.
- Competed at Miss Elite.
- Competed at Top Model of the World.
- Competed at Reina Internacional del Café.
- Competed at Reina Mundial del Banano.
- Competed at Miss Continentes Unidos.
- Competed at Miss Global City.

Former Franchises:

- Competed at Miss Grand International.
- Competed at Miss Costa Maya International.

| Year | Titleholder | Hometown | Placement | Special Award | Notes |
|---|---|---|---|---|---|
| 2026 | Danna Gabriela Martínez Gómez | Ciudad Obregón | TBD | | |
| 2025 | Dalia Ramos Velderrain | Navojoa | - | - | - |
| 2024 | In 2024, due to changes in the dates of the national pageant, the election of the state queens was postponed for one year. | | | | |
| 2023 | Angélica Willem | San Luis Río Colorado | Top 16 | - | 1st Runner-up at Miss Sonora 2019 |
| 2022 | In 2022, due to changes in the dates of the national pageant, the election of the state queens was postponed for one year. | | | | |
| 2021 | Vanessa López Quijada | Nogales | Miss México Supranational | Miss Beach Beauty | Top 12 at Miss Supranational 2023; Top 8 at Miss México Elite 2023; Competed at Miss F1 México 2015; Virreina Hispanoamericana 2014; Reina Hispanoamericana México 2014; 1st Runner-up at Nuestra Belleza México 2013; 1st Runner-up at Nuestra Belleza Mundo México 2013; Nuestra Belleza Sonora 2013 |
| 2020 | In 2020, due to the contingency of COVID-19 there was a lag in the year of the state contest | | | | |
| 2019 | Ayram Guadalupe Ortiz Alonso | Caborca | Top 6 | Dances of Mexico | 5th Runner-up at Miss Continentes Unidos 2022; Miss México Continentes Unidos 2022 |
| 2018 | Paulina Martínez Rivera | Navojoa | Top 16 | - | 2nd Runner-up at Nuestra Belleza Sonora 2012 |
| 2017 | Daniela Ochoa Torres | Ciudad Obregón | Top 16 | - | - |
| 2016 | Norhely Celaya Bracamontes | Hermosillo | Top 10 | - | 2nd Runner-up at Top Model of the World 2017; Miss México Top Model of the World 2017; Top 15 at Miss México Grand 2017; Miss Grand Sonora 2015; Competed at Nuestra Belleza Sonora 2011; Competed at Nuestra Belleza Sonora 2009 |

== See also ==
- Mexicana Universal Sonora
