= Stella Araneta =

Colombian pageant director and beauty queen (born 1939)

Stella Márquez Araneta
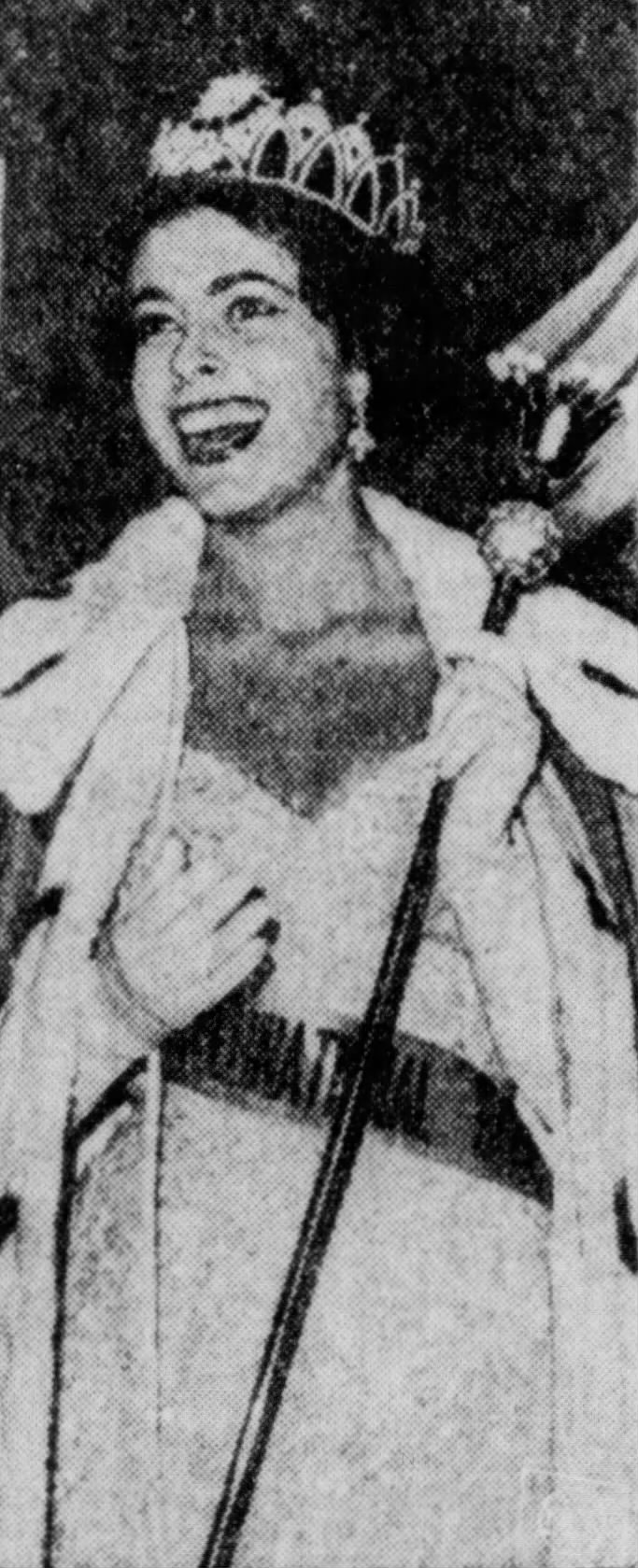
- Márquez in 1960
- Born: María Stella Márquez Zawadski; May 4, 1939 (age 87); Tumaco, Nariño, Colombia
- Citizenship: Colombia (by birthplace); Philippines (naturalized)
- Occupations: National Director; 1964 — (current); Chargé d'affaires
- Height: 1.70 m (5 ft 7 in)
- Spouse: Jorge León Araneta (m. 1962)
- Beauty pageant titleholder
- Title: Miss Colombia 1959; Miss International 1960
- Hair color: Brown
- Eye color: Brown
- Major competitions: Miss Colombia 1959; (Winner); Miss Universe 1960; (Top 15); Miss International 1960; (Winner)

María Stella Márquez de Araneta (née Márquez Zawadski; born May 4, 1939) also known as Stella Marquez—Araneta, is a Colombian pageant director and beauty queen. She grew up in Tumaco, Cali, Bogotá, New York City and Los Angeles, and moved back to Colombia, where she became a pageant titleholder. As Miss Colombia, she was crowned as the first Miss International in 1960. She was the first Colombian to win the Miss International title and also won before she was followed by Paulina Gálvez in 1999.

Araneta was the former National Director of the Miss Universe and current director for Miss International franchises in the Philippines, and founded the Binibining Pilipinas organization. She has served as chair of the Binibining Pilipinas Charities Incorporated for fifty years.

== Early life ==
Araneta was born in Tumaco, Nariño, Colombia to Arturo Eduardo Márquez Acevedo of Spanish descent, and Stella Zawadski Navia of Polish descent. She moved to the United States in 1954. She has two younger sisters. At the time, she was a high school student at Marymount School of New York in Manhattan. Initially, her father, a Senator and a Civil Engineer, decided to take her out of the school to Colombia on a promise of temporary vacation. As a young student, Araneta classified herself as a Gringa, noting that she was completely unable to relate to the Colombian culture, including its national dance, the cumbia.

After high school, Araneta enrolled in Marymount College, Tarrytown, New York to continue her major both in psychology and the French language. In 1957, she won an honorary prize as a beauty model for Pan American Airlines, though not necessarily a pageant contest. She also represented as Miss Honduras on a local Los Angeles pageant due to its lack of national entry. During that time, she was sent by the nuns from her school as one of the "court princesses" for the 1957 homecoming event in Loyola Marymount University as a gesture of solidarity among affiliated Catholic schools for women.

== Miss Colombia ==
During her stay in Colombia, Araneta learned the value of social work and became acquainted with the local Roman Catholic Church there to fund charities. The first charity she helped manage was named "Banquet of the Millionaires" through the assistance of a famed Catholic priest, Father Rafael García Herreros (1909–1992). Araneta was chosen as the representative of her country in 1958 by winning three local titles, Miss Tumaco, Miss Nariño and Miss Queen of Spain. Her victory under the department state of Nariño was notable for not having sent a candidate in twelve years while her travel visa permit to stay in Colombia was limited to two months.

During her national competition, she used the Colombian national costume as a Sibundoy Indian princess, wearing a gold headband and a Ruana shawl as a veil. After winning Miss Colombia in 1959, she was personally congratulated and photographed with former Colombian president, Alberto Lleras Camargo.

During the Miss Universe 1960 competition, the swimsuit assigned to her during her national competition was a one piece blue cerulean swimsuit with golden cleavage ornamentation (the other contestants were assigned yellow and pink). Ultimately, she competed and won the title for Señorita Colombia, gaining her access to become the national Colombian representative in Miss Universe 1960 (Top 15 Placement) at 6th-Runner up, then to Miss International 1960 (winner placement) of which she won against Miss India, Iona Pinto of Maharashtra.

== Miss International ==
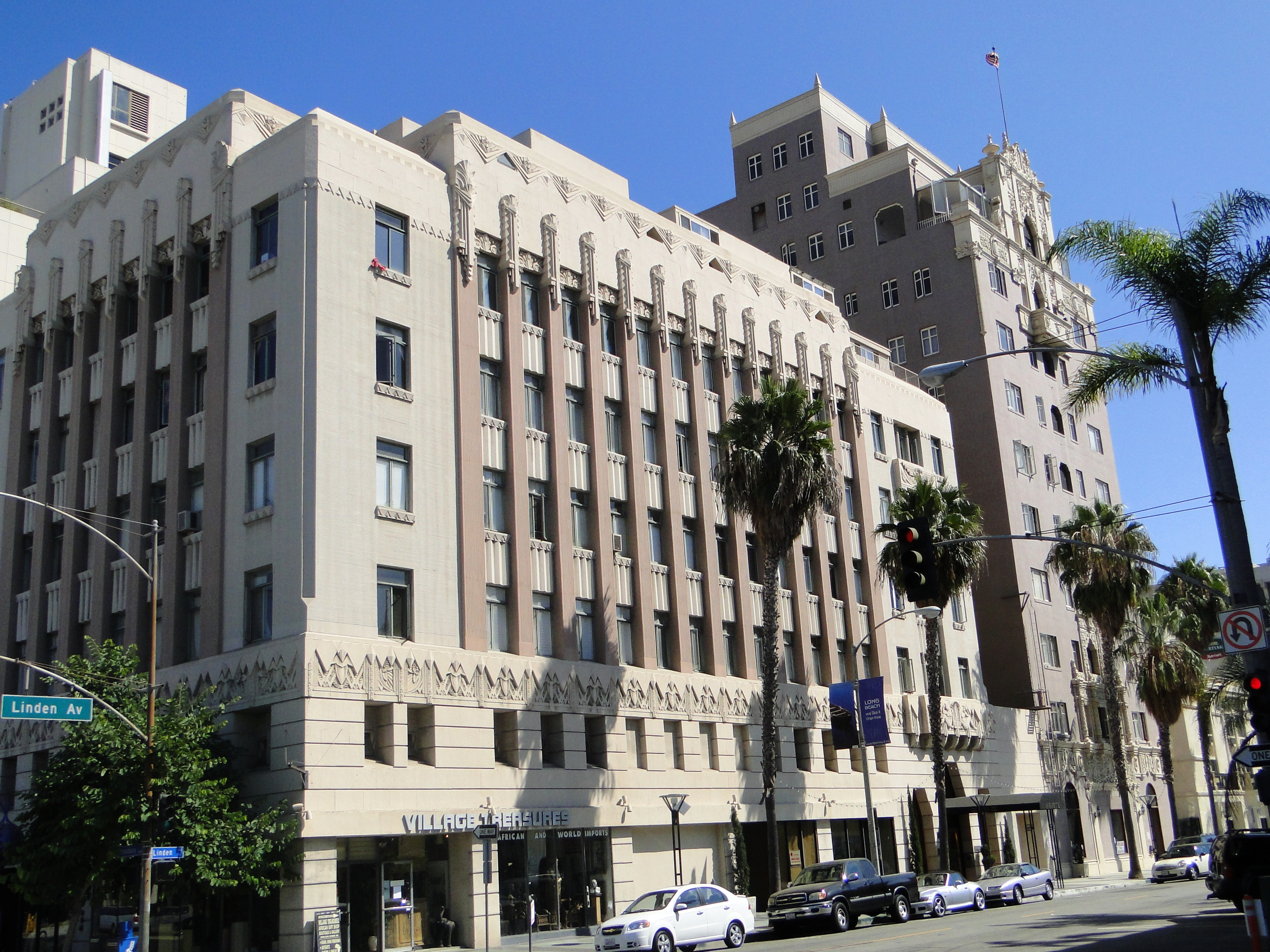
The historic Lafayette Hotel, where Marquez won the first Miss International title in 1960, in Long Beach. Since 1969, it has served as a luxury condominium building.

She became Miss Colombia in 1959, and competed in the Miss Universe 1960 pageant held in Miami Beach, Florida placing as a top 15 semi-finalist, at 6th—runner up placement.

Accordingly, Colombia sent her again as a national representative through the financial patronage of Max Factor cosmetics. As part of the promotional entourage group, she was given a tour with Conrad Hilton Sr. at the new renovation of the Beverly Hilton hotel. Hilton Sr. himself, jokingly asked Araneta if she would consider marrying his firstborn son and hotel heir Conrad Hilton Jr. in case he divorces again from Patricia McClintock, which consequently occurred in 1965.

At age 23, she competed in the first Miss International pageant held in Long Beach, California in 1960, becoming the first Miss International, and also the first Latin American titleholder in that line of pageants. During the press presentation at the former Lafayette Hotel, Araneta openly declared that she preferred to wear a figure-tight swimsuit that would showcase the pageant body she worked hard to achieve, rather than the loose playsuits sponsored by the pageant organizers. She won the first evening gown competition out of the three rounds at the pageant. Her measurements for the swimsuit competition, which paved the way for her victory, were recorded at 95—62—95 and exactly 170 centimeters tall. Ultimately, she won the title and received the following grand total prizes:

- Cashier's check of US$10,000, sponsored by the mayor and the Port of Long Beach.
- An 18K karat yellow gold floral ring valued at US$3,500
- A Japanese diamond encrusted wristwatch valued at US$300
- The Miss International pageant trophy, sash and crown

Accordingly, after winning Miss International 1960, the president of Marymount College, Irish Mother Superior Brendan Mairé McQuillan PhD, sent a formal letter to Araneta requesting her to choose a different school due to her active participation in pageantry, namely the swimsuit competition, deemed taboo at the time.

After her championship, Araneta decided to her use her fame to work and was hired as a tourist promoter for a European tour package company, as well as an endorser for the New Year's Day 1961 Rose Bowl and 72nd Tournament of Roses parade in Pasadena, California. The parade float was titled "Lovely to Look At" and featured Araneta on top of large 17-foot tall fountain with surrounding nine basins of spraying water. And in 1961, she crowned her successor Stam van Baer of the Netherlands as her successor, after reigning as Miss International 1960, for an entire year.

In the 48th edition of Miss International 2008, Araneta participated as one of the designated panel of judges during the pageant competition held in Macau, China.

== Miss Philippines ==
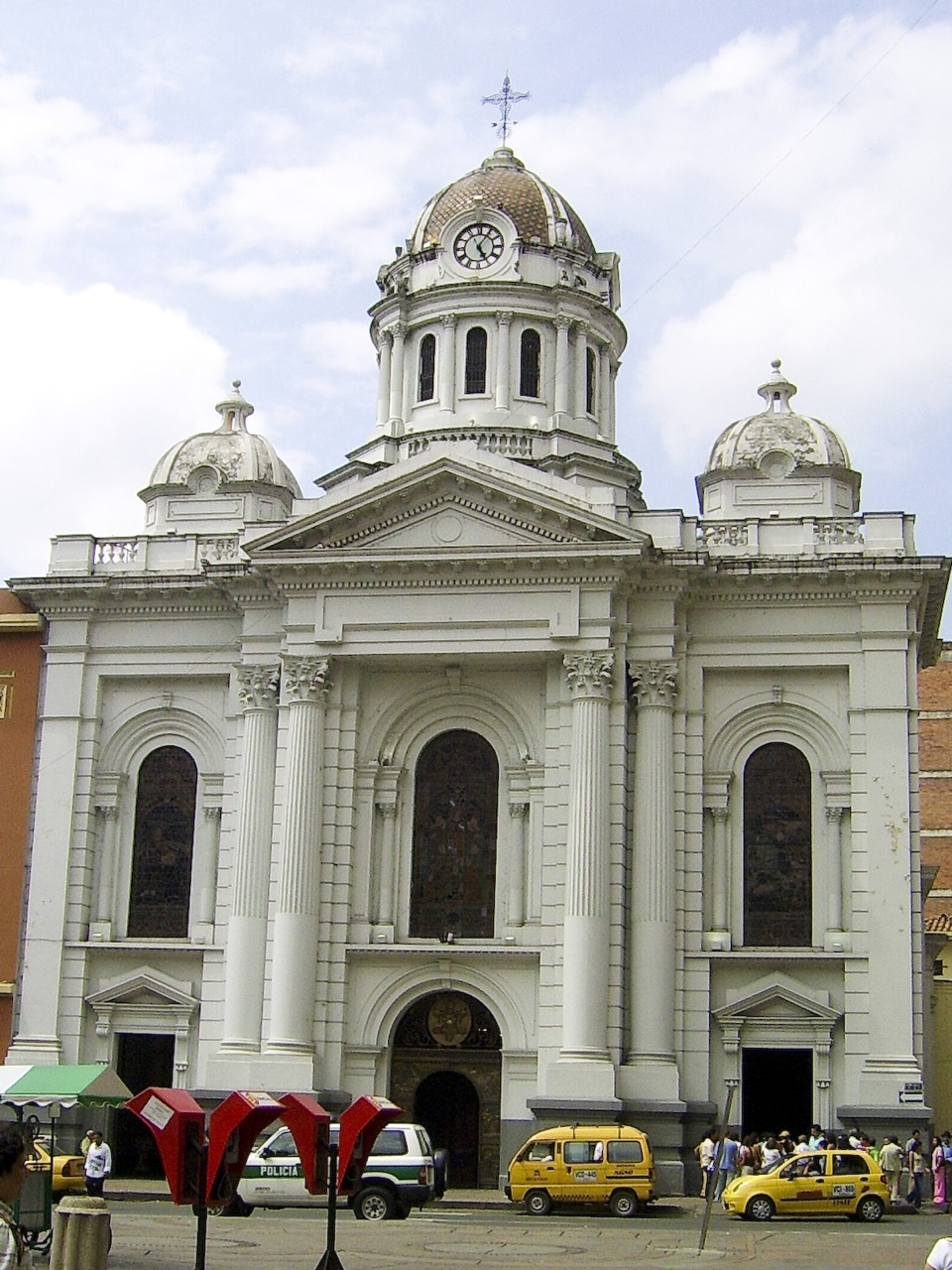
The Metropolitan Cathedral of Saint Peter in Santiago de Cali, Colombia, where Stella and Jorge Araneta celebrated their wedding on September 8, 1962.

She married Jorge León Araneta, a prominent Filipino businessman, at the Metropolitan Cathedral of Saint Peter in Santiago de Cali, Colombia. Their grand wedding reception was held in Hotel Alferez Real, a well-known hotel in the city which was demolished in 1972. When Araneta first arrived in Manila, she found that the country was similar to Hispanic cities and expected a more oriental culture similar to neighboring territories like British Hong Kong and Japan. She toured many parts of the Philippines.

On her 28th birthday in June 1967, she was assigned by her father-in-law J. Amado Araneta as the organizer of Binibining Pilipinas (English: Miss Philippines), which sends its winners to the Miss Universe and Miss International competitions.

== Personal life ==
Araneta is of Spanish and Polish heritage. She collects premium emeralds, a gemstone highly valued in her native Colombia. She is a traveler, along with her husband.

== Other awards ==
In 2013, Araneta was inducted to the Eastwood City Walk of Fame in Quezon City, Philippines.

Awards and achievements
First	Miss International; 1960	Succeeded by (Netherlands) Stanny van Baer
First	Miss Colombia International; 1960	Succeeded by Wilma Kohlgruber
Preceded by Olga Pumarejo	Miss Colombia Universe; 1960	Succeeded by Patricia Whitman
Preceded by Luz Marina Zuluaga	Miss Colombia; 1959	Succeeded by Sonia Heidman
