= Paulina Gálvez =

Paulina Gálvez may refer to:

- Paulina Gálvez (actress) (born 1969), Spanish actress
- Paulina Gálvez (Miss International), Colombian pageant winner
