= Donna Martell =

American actress (born 1927)

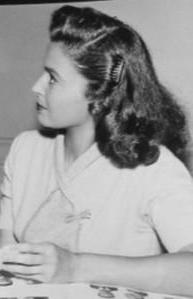
- Martell in The Lineup
- Born: December 24, 1927 (age 98); Los Angeles, California, U.S.
- Education: Los Angeles City College
- Occupation: Actress
- Years active: 1947–1963, 1983
- Spouse: Gene Corso (1953–1996) (his death)
- Children: 3

Donna Martell (born December 24, 1927) is an American former actress who appeared in film and television during the Golden Age Era in the 1950s and 1960s.

== Early years ==
Born on December 24, 1927, in Los Angeles, California, to Louis and Margaret de Maria, Martell was active in athletics in high school and attended Los Angeles City College.

== Career ==
Martell began her film career in 1947, when she was cast in the Republic Pictures western Apache Rose, starring Roy Rogers and Dale Evans. She continued making appearances throughout the late 1940s, signing a contract with Universal Studios. In 1951, Columbia Pictures signed her to appear in The Hills of Utah.

By the time the 1950s arrived, Martell's career shifted towards television. She portrayed Marie DiPaolo in The Bob Cummings Show and appeared in shows such as Shotgun Slade, Cavalcade of America, The Range Rider, Bat Masterson and Cheyenne.

Martell was also in Project Moonbase (also known as Project Moon Base), a 1953 black-and-white science-fiction film directed by Richard Talmadge. The film is unusual for its time in both attempting to portray space travel in a "realistic" manner, and for depicting a future in which women hold positions of authority and responsibility equal to men. In the script, Martell's character Briteis (nickname "bright-eyes") is a colonel who has made the first orbital flight around the Earth four years earlier and outranks her fellow male astronaut, a major. Colonel Briteis' given name is never stated.

Martell's acting career officially ended in 1963, but made a brief comeback in the 1983 TV movie Grace Kelly, playing the part of Mrs. Edie Austin, a friend of the Kelly family who, along with her husband Russell Austin, was instrumental in advancing the real-life relationship between Grace Kelly and Prince Rainier III of Monaco.

== Personal life ==
Martell married professional baseball player Gene Edgar Corso on June 27, 1953. The couple had three children. Corso pre-deceased his wife in 1996.

== Awards ==
Martell was presented with one of the 2002 Golden Boot Awards for her contributions to western television and cinema.

== Filmography ==
Year	Title	Role	Notes
1947	Apache Rose	Rosa Vega	
1947	Twilight on the Rio Grande	1st telephone operator	Uncredited
1947	Robin Hood of Monterey	Lolita	
1947	The Lost Moment	Pretty Girl	Uncredited
1947	Secret Beyond the Door	Young Mexican girl	Uncredited
1948	The Woman from Tangier	Flo-Flo	
1948	The Saxon Charm	Flower girl	Uncredited
1948	Mexican Hayride	Girl	Uncredited
1949	Illegal Entry	Maria	
1949	Abbott and Costello Meet the Killer, Boris Karloff	Betty Crandall	
1950	I Was a Shoplifter	Sales clerk	Uncredited
1950	Peggy	Contestant	
1950	Kim	Haikun	Uncredited
1951	The Hills of Utah	Nola French	
1951	Elephant Stampede	Lola	
1952	Last Train from Bombay	Nawob's daughter	
1952	The Golden Hawk	Emilie Savonez	
1953	Project Moonbase	Colonel Briteis	
1953	Give a Girl a Break	Janet Hallson	
1954	The Egyptian	Lady in waiting	Uncredited
1955	Ten Wanted Men	Maria Segura	
1955	Love Is a Many-Splendored Thing	Suchen	
1955	Last of the Desperados	Felice	
1957	Hell on Devil's Island	Giselle Renault	
1957	House of Numbers	Lois	Uncredited

== Television ==
- The Adventures of Kit Carson (1952–1953) five characters in seven episodes
- Death Valley Days (1952) "She Burns Green" – Rosie Winters; (1955) "The Valencia Cake" – Charlita
- The Lineup (1955) "Girl Safecrackers"
- G.E. Summer Originals (1956) "Blizzard Bound"
- The West Point Story (1957) two different episodes
- The Lineup (1958) "The Pawn Ticket Case"
- Cheyenne (1960) as Maria, in television episode "Home Is the Brave" – Maria Prescott
- 77 Sunset Strip (1961) "Hot Tomale Caper", Two-part episode – Maria Rodriguez
- Tales of Wells Fargo (1961, Episode: "John Jones") – Zita Lopez
- Hawaiian Eye (1962) "Pursuit of a Lady – Maria Orello
- Bonanza (1963) "Toy Soldier" Esther Callahan
