= Paulina Gálvez (Miss International) =

Colombian beauty queen

- Born: Paulina Margarita Gálvez Pineda; April 23, 1980 (age 46); Antiguo Cuscatlán, La Libertad, El Salvador
- Beauty pageant titleholder
- Title: Miss Nariño 1998; Miss International Colombia 1998; Miss International 1999
- Major competitions: Miss Colombia 1998 (1st Runner-Up); Miss International 1999 (Winner)

Paulina Margarita Gálvez Pineda (April 23, 1980) is a Salvadoran-Colombian model and beauty queen. She became the second representative from her country to win the Miss International pageant in 1999 in Tokyo, Japan, where she was also adjudged as Miss Photogenic. She won after Stella Araneta in 1960 and before Jeymmy Vargas in 2004.

== Early life ==
Paulina Gálvez was born in Antiguo Cuscatlán, El Salvador on April 23, 1980, to a Colombian parents from Pasto, Nariño.

== Pageantry ==
=== Señorita Nariño 1998 ===
Gálvez was declared Miss Nariño, for Miss Colombia 1998.

=== Señorita Colombia 1998 ===
She participated, representing Nariño, in Miss Colombia 1998. At the end of the gala, she ended up as Miss Colombia International / first runner up of the contest, and got the opportunity to compete in Miss International as a participant in Colombia.

=== Miss International 1999 ===
Gálvez represented her country and won Miss International 1999 on 14 December 1999 in U-Port Hall, Tokyo, Japan. Gálvez became the second Colombian to win the title.

Awards and achievements
Preceded by (Panama) Lía Borrero	Miss International; 1999	Succeeded by (Venezuela) Vivian Urdaneta
