= The Slime People =

1963 film by Robert Hutton

- Theatrical release poster
- Directed by: Robert Hutton
- Written by: Blair Robertson; Vance Skarstedt
- Produced by: Joseph F. Robertson
- Starring: Robert Hutton; Les Tremayne; Robert Burton
- Cinematography: William Troiano
- Edited by: Don Henderson
- Music by: Lou Frohman
- Distributed by: Donald J. Hansen Enterprises
- Release date: 1963
- Running time: 76 minutes
- Country: United States
- Language: English
- Budget: $56,000 (estimated)

The Slime People is a 1963 horror film directed by Robert Hutton, who also starred in the film. The film was featured on the first season of the television show Mystery Science Theater 3000, as well as the 1986 syndicated series The Canned Film Festival.

The film was infamous for its extensive use of fog machines, with the fog becoming so thick towards the end that it is virtually impossible to see any of the actors.

== Plot ==
The film concerns a race of subterranean reptile-men (dubbed "slime people", due to their slime-covered skin) who create a wall of "solidified fog" around Los Angeles using a strange organic-looking machine and proceed to invade the city after they are driven out of their subterranean homes by underground atomic tests. A pilot (portrayed by Hutton) lands in Los Angeles after some flight difficulties and finds the city almost deserted. He later encounters other survivors, including a Marine separated from his unit, and a scientist and his two daughters, and the group try their best to halt the further invasion of the slime people who are attempting to use the fog to not only isolate the city but also to lower the surface temperature enough to let them function at all hours of the day. Eventually, near the end of the film, the survivors find that while the slime people are otherwise immune to conventional weapons due to their body's ability to quickly seal wounds, the creatures can be killed with their own spear weapons as they are hollow and prevent the wounds they inflict from closing properly. They also realize the reason the plane from the beginning of the film was able to land was due to the chemical making the fog reacting with the salt from the ocean water thus preventing the section near the sea from solidifying. With these facts in mind, the survivors then attempt to escape the city using several buckets of a saltwater solution to try and make a hole through the fog wall, however, when this fails due to them not having enough of the solution the group instead opts to destroy the machine generating the fog. With the machine destroyed, the fog quickly disperses allowing the military to enter the city and causing the slime people to die off from the rapid rise in temperature.

== Cast ==
- Robert Hutton as Tom Gregory
- Les Tremayne as Norman Tolliver
- Robert Burton as Prof. Galbraith
- Susan Hart as Lisa Galbraith
- William Boyce as Cal Johnson
- Judee Morton as Bonnie Galbraith
- John Close as Vince Williams

== Production ==
Filming began in January 1962 at the KTTV television studio. The film ran out of money after nine days of shooting; the cast completed the film without pay. Additional sequences were shot at San Fernando airport (closed 1985) in San Fernando, California, in Mandeville Canyon (showing damage after a wildfire) and in Agoura Hills, California.

Joseph F. Robertson recalled that the filmmakers originally intended to feature dwarves as giant voles, who would serve as the advance guard of the invasion, but the sequence was so bad it was cut from the released film.

Robertson stated that the film was shot for around $80,000 and featured eight costumes worn by stuntmen, each costume costing $600. Vance Skarstedt was the original screenwriter, but his script was rewritten by Robertson's wife Blair.

In an interview with Hutton, he said that neither he nor the stuntmen were paid for their work in the film, and that the slime people costumes cost over half of the film's budget.

Richard Arlen was the original choice to play Prof. Galbraith, but Robert Burton took the role. Burton died of cancer shortly after filming. The Slime People was the only film directed by Hutton, who later wrote the script for the 1975 horror/drama film Persecution.

== Release ==
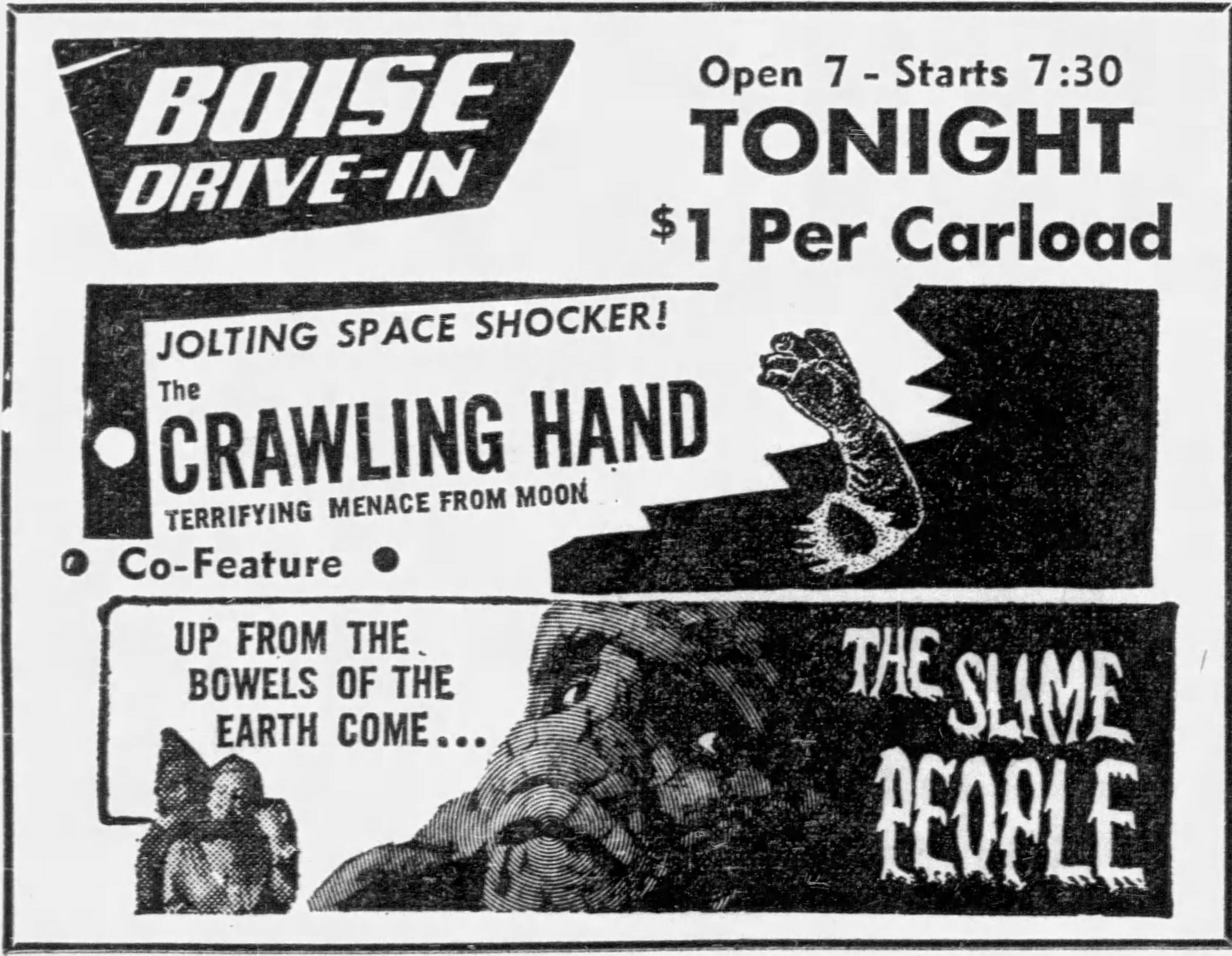
Drive-in advertisement from 1963 for The Slime People and co-feature, The Crawling Hand.

=== Home media ===
The film was first released on VHS by Video Gems in 1981, and later by Rhino Home Video in 1989 and again on February 20, 1996.

It was released on DVD in 2001, first by Tapeworm on January 16, 2001, as a double feature with Creature (1985), and then by Rhino on August 14. It was later released on DVD by VCI Video as a part of its two-disk Creepy Creature Double Feature collection alongside The Crawling Hand (1963).

== Reception ==
Author and film critic Leonard Maltin awarded the film a BOMB, his lowest rating, stating that the film "talks itself to death". On his website Fantastic Movie Musings and Ramblings, Dave Sindelar criticized the film's inconsistent tone, repetitive soundtrack, and lack of visibility due to the overabundance of fog. TV Guide gave the film a negative review, awarding it 1 out of 4 stars. Allmovie also panned The Slime People, calling it "cheap" and "inept", and further stated that the film only worked in short spurts. Graeme Clark from The Spinning Image awarded the film 4/10 stars, writing, "One thing you can say about The Slime People is that the money is all there up on the screen. It's just a pity there wasn't very much of it, because the cash evidently went on making the costumes for the titular monsters and the rest went on post-production mist effects." Reviewing VCI Video's release of the film, Glenn Erickson from DVD Talk called it "a prime example of a no-budget monster show hoping to find a place on a drive-in double bill".

The Terror Trap awarded the film 3/4 stars, writing, "Quick and quirky, it’s among the last in the great double-bill creature feature era".
