= Leticia Murray =

Beauty pageant competitor

- Born: Leticia Judith Murray Acedo; June 28, 1979 (age 47); Hermosillo, Sonora, Mexico
- Other name: Letty Murray
- Height: 1.78 m (5 ft 10 in)
- Beauty pageant titleholder
- Hair color: Light brown
- Major competitions: Nuestra Belleza Sonora 1999 (Winner); Nuestra Belleza México 1999 (Winner); Miss Universe 2000 (Unplaced) (Best National Costume); Miss International 2000 (Top 15)

Leticia Judith Murray Acedo (born June 28, 1979) is a Mexican actress and beauty pageant titleholder who represented her country in Miss Universe 2000 and Miss International 2000.

== Nuestra Belleza Mexico ==
Murray competed in 1999 as the delegate from Sonora in her country's national beauty pageant, Nuestra Belleza México, after winning her state pageant on June 4, 1999.

A few months later, on 10 September 1999, in Pachuca, Hidalgo, she gained the right to represent Mexico in Miss Universe 2000 after being crowned Nuestra Belleza México 1999.

== Miss Universe 2000 ==
As the official representative of her country to the 2000 Miss Universe pageant, broadcast live on May 12, 2000, from Nicosia, Cyprus, Murray obtained the Best National Costume and Clairol Herbal Essences Style awards.

== Miss International 2000 ==
Murray also represented her country in Miss International 2000 and became one of the Top 15 semifinalists.

Awards and achievements
Preceded by (Morelos) Graciela Soto	Nuestra Belleza Int'l México; 2000	Succeeded by (Quintana Roo) Lilián Villanueva
Preceded by (Nuevo León) Silvia Salgado	Nuestra Belleza México; 1999	Succeeded by (Jalisco) Jacqueline Bracamontes
Preceded by Lina Samaniego	Nuestra Belleza Sonora; 1999	Succeeded by Ana Astiazarán
