= The Crawling Hand =

1963 film by Herbert L. Strock

- One-sheet
- Directed by: Herbert L. Strock
- Screenplay by: Bill Idelson; Herbert L. Strock
- Based on: from an original story by Joseph Cranston; Malcolm Young; Bill Idelson
- Produced by: Joseph F. Robertson
- Starring: Peter Breck; Kent Taylor; Rod Lauren
- Cinematography: Willard Van der Veer
- Edited by: Herbert L. Strock
- Music by: Marlin Skiles (uncredited)
- Production company: Joseph F. Robertson Productions
- Distributed by: Donald J. Hansen Enterprises
- Release dates: September 4, 1963 (Hartford, Connecticut)
- Running time: 89 minutes
- Country: United States
- Language: English
- Budget: $100,000 (estimated)

The Crawling Hand is a 1963 American science fiction horror film directed by Herbert L. Strock, and starring Peter Breck, Kent Taylor, Rod Lauren, Alan Hale Jr., and Allison Hayes. It was later featured on the television shows Mystery Science Theater 3000 (MST3K) and The Canned Film Festival.

== Plot ==
An astronaut, out of oxygen and coming in for a crash landing, somehow manages to re-establish radio contact and tell ground control to activate the ship self-destruction mechanism. After wondering why the astronaut couldn't do it himself, ground control pushes the red button, causing the ship to explode at 70,000 feet (21,000 m); scientists Steve Curan, Max Weitzberg, and their assistant Donna discover that the late astronaut was infected by an alien lifeform.

Meanwhile, Paul Lawrence, a science student, and his girlfriend Marta Farnstrom find a severed human arm on a beach in California. Recognizing the sleeve as that of an astronaut's uniform, Paul takes it home for study. The crawling hand murders his landlady and possesses Paul himself, causing him to attack other people around town including Marta and a soda shop owner.

Upon learning that the late astronaut's fingerprints were found on the corpse of Paul's landlady, Curan and Weitzberg arrive in California to question Paul. Sheriff Townsend believes that Paul is the culprit.

In a lucid moment, Paul captures the hand and takes it to the city dump, where he stabs it with a broken bottle and it is eaten by cats, freeing Paul from the alien influence. Paul and Marta live happily ever after, while Curan and Weitzberg return to Washington.

Meanwhile the federales charged with transporting the offending appendage open the box used to confine the hand. The film ends with a quick zoom the mysteriously empty box as the words "the end" appear on screen.

== Cast ==
- Peter Breck as Steve Curan
- Kent Taylor as Dr. Max Weitzberg
- Rod Lauren as Paul Lawrence
- Alan Hale, Jr. as Sheriff Townsend
- Allison Hayes as Donna
- Sirry Steffen as Marta Farnstrom
- Arline Judge as Mrs. Hotchkiss
- Richard Arlen as Lee Barrenger
- Tristam Coffin as Security Chief Meidel
- Ross Elliott as Deputy Earl Harrison
- G. Stanley Jones as Funeral Director
- Jock Putnam as Ambulance Attendant
- Andy Andrews as Ambulance Attendant
- Syd Saylor as Soda Shop Owner
- Ed Wermer as Prof. Farnstrom
- Beverly Lunsford as Patsy Townsend
- Les Hoyle

Note: character names are not indicated in on-screen credits.

== Release and reception ==
The Crawling Hand was first released in 1963 by Donald J. Hansen Enterprises with American International Pictures distributing the film in the summer of 1964. Afterwards, it was distributed for broadcast syndication by Medallion TV as part of their "Creeping Terrors" package, which included other low-budget films such as Jungle Hell, Monster from the Ocean Floor, and Robot Monster.

Welch D. Everman described The Crawling Hand as "a film by grown-ups telling kids to grow up themselves" disguised as a teen science fiction. Rob Craig praised the editing, photography and music, while criticizing the script; Craig also stated that Michael J. Weldon, founder of the Psychotronic Video magazine enjoyed the film's use of The Rivingtons single "The Bird's the Word".

== Home media ==
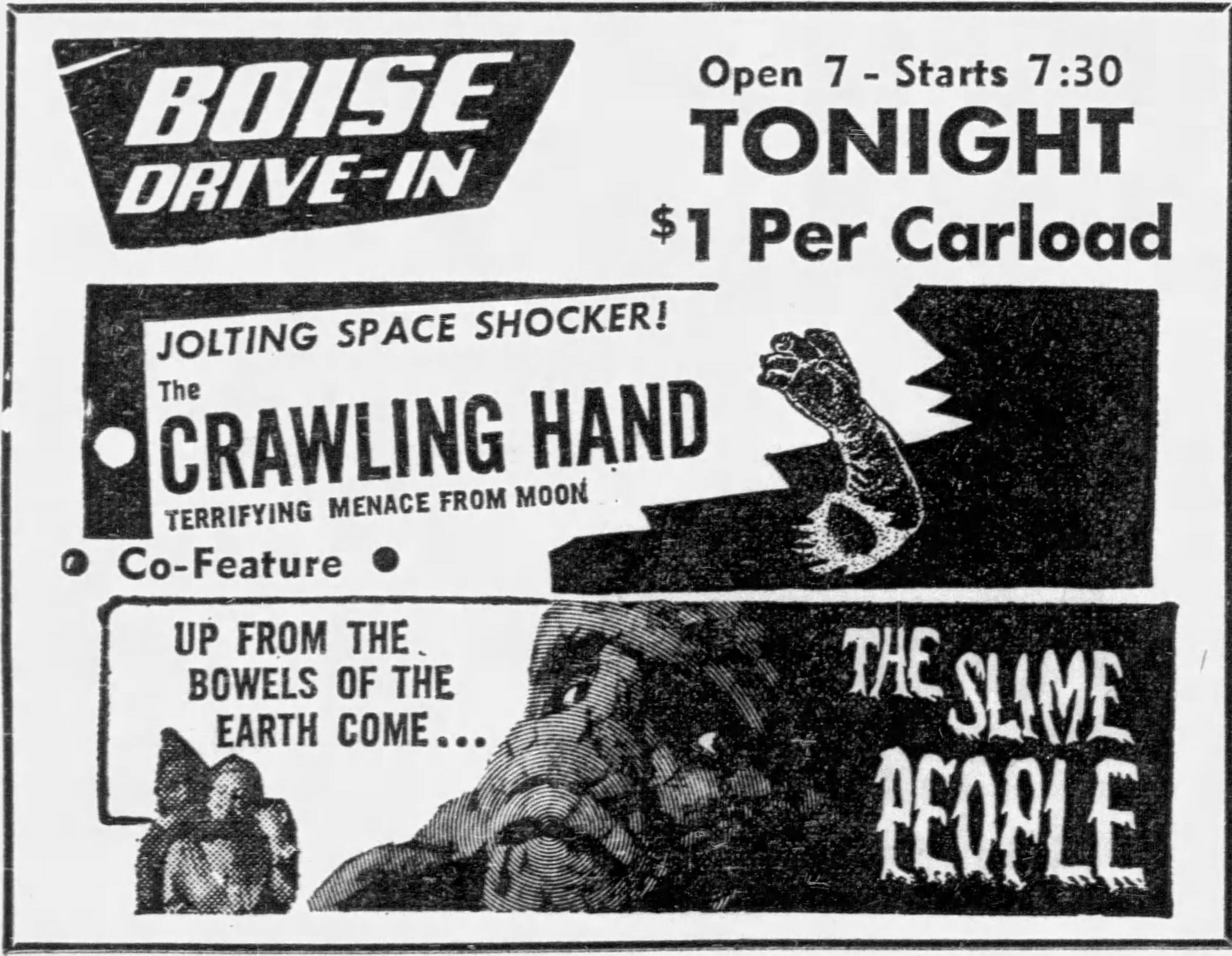
Drive-in advertisement from 1963 for The Crawling Hand and co-feature, The Slime People.

The Crawling Hand was distributed on VHS by Video Gems and Rhino Home Video. It was also featured in Episode 6 of Season 1 of the TV series Mystery Science Theater 3000. This episode was released on VHS by Rhino Home Video in October 1999 and on DVD in June 2002, including the uncut film as a bonus feature.

== In other media ==
Rick Moody's novel The Four Fingers of Death, released in July 2010 by Little, Brown and Company, is a metafictional novelization of an imagined 2025 remake of The Crawling Hand (which means that Moody's fictional 'novelization' is set in a future very different from that of the 1963 film).
