= Canned Film Festival =

American comedy television series

- Canned Film Festival logo as used by the Dr Pepper Company in 1986
- Genre: Comedy
- Created by: Young & Rubicam
- Directed by: Jonathan Heap
- Starring: Laraine Newman; F. Richards Ford; Laura Galusha; Patrick Garner; Philip Nee; Katheryn Rossetter
- Country of origin: United States
- Original language: English
- No. of seasons: 1
- No. of episodes: 13

Production
- Executive producers: Jeff Lawenda; Michael Yudin
- Producers: John Gilroy; Margot Breier
- Running time: approx. 92 minutes

Original release
- Network: Syndicated

The Canned Film Festival is a comedy-based motion picture television series that was nationally syndicated during the late night hours in the United States for a single season in the summer of 1986. The name is a play on the Cannes Film Festival, the annual world-renowned film-screening celebration in Cannes, France. Not to be confused with the latter, the Canned Film Festival featured B movies as the centerpiece for each television episode, and was composed of short vignettes interwoven throughout the films. Boasting the tagline "late night with the best of the worst", the series was promoted and sponsored by the Dr. Pepper Company, whose then-tagline "out-of-the-ordinary" echoed the show's collection of odd and strange movies. The series was created by Young & Rubicam, developed for television by Chelsea Communications, and distributed by LBS Communications.

Although similar in style to the successful Mystery Science Theater 3000 series shown on cable TV a few years later, the Canned Film Festival differed in that its comedy scenes occurred strictly during the commercial intermissions instead of adding peanut gallery type satire during the actual run of the movies. In addition, the script, although comic in nature, often reflected upon the serious contextual and cultural subjects contained in the featured movies, sometimes providing historical insight into their production. An example is seen during the episode featuring Project Moonbase, where female spaceship commanders were discussed as an accurate future prediction by the 1950s era movie, as were cordless telephones and big screen televisions. The featured B movies of the series were not full-length, and edited to fit the show's approximately two-hour timeframe per episode.

== Plot summary ==
The series plot was built around the fictional town of Limekirk, Texas, where the local Ritz theater was undergoing economic and cultural decline due to lack of a customer base. The owner and sole usherette, Laraine (Laraine Newman), took extreme measures to attract moviegoers by adding laundry facilities to the lobby and stocking a large collection of unusual confections. With the exception of popcorn and Dr. Pepper, these confections were completely fictional, with names like "Butter Lumps", "Chocolate Covered Lug Nuts", and "Diet-Free Nutra-Cal Bars", and were occasionally the source for minor script material.

As the story maintains during the opening sequence of each episode, the most successful of Laraine's business ventures to rejuvenate the Ritz was, by far, the screening of strange and unusual films that resulted in the series' namesake. Laraine, together with her mother who ran the projector booth, succeeded in attracting several new customers who became regular characters throughout the rest of the series run.

== Cast and characters ==
Publicity photograph of the cast ensemble for the Canned Film Festival. From left to right: Jack (F. Richards Ford), Doris (Kathryn Rossetter), Chan (Philip Nee), Laraine (Laraine Newman), Becky (Laura Galusha), and Fitzy (Patrick Garner).

The series starred Laraine Newman of Saturday Night Live fame, whose main character, Laraine the usherette, wore an old-fashioned maroon ushers uniform and ran the Ritz with such strict organization as to assign every patron a seat despite the theater's constant near-empty attendance. Laraine ensured that each movie started exactly on time as scheduled, cuing her mother in the production booth via a microphone. Laraine's mother was never actually named nor completely seen during any of the episodes, but sometimes communicated by pounding on the walls or playing musical tunes (presumably with an instrument or a sound device in the booth and transmitted through the theater's sound system).

The supporting characters, five in all, were split roughly along gender lines, with three men and two women. The women included Doris (Kathryn Rossetter), a middle-aged aficionado of romantic drama stories, and Becky (Laura Galusha) a girl in her early twenties who offered a young feminist perspective to the movies. The men included Jack (F. Richards Ford), Fitzy (Patrick Garner), and Chan (Philip Nee). Jack, as well as the being the love interest of Becky, was also Limekirk's newspaper reporter who was required to review the movies. Together with the middle-aged Fitzy, the two manifested the stereotypical male-oriented fascinations for lowbrow action, crude sexual innuendos, and took morbid pleasure in making fun of some of the movies' more macabre themes (such as nuclear warfare in the feature Rocket Attack U.S.A.).

Chan, in addition to being of Asian descent (as opposed to the rest of the cast being Caucasian), was a mute who never spoke except during the episode featuring the movie The Slime People where Laraine dreamt that Chan was possessed. What role Chan's character brought to the series is less clear, although he sometimes provided a childlike response to the episode plots, such as taking a spin in one of the lobby's clothes driers after being inspired by the outer-space setting of the featured movie Project Moonbase. Chan's muteness in the show was only implied, leaving it up to the audience to decide whether or not he could physically speak (although he did laugh on occasion), or if his condition was simply a language barrier written into the script.

== Production ==
Prior to merging with 7 Up in May 1986, Dr Pepper brand development conceived The Canned Film Festival as means to reach a target audience of consumers between ages 12 and 24 by promoting the soft drink as a novel and unconventional refreshment that stood out against the larger cola rivals of the time. David Millheiser, manager of brand development for Dr Pepper at the time, hoped to attract a young audience who would view the featured films as "wonderfully bad". However, the effort was short-lived, as the series lasted for only one season in the summer of 1986. Although plans were made for a second season as evidenced by the first season end credits that solicited viewers to submit their favorite "best of the worst" movies via mail correspondence, it was not known how far these plans had progressed when the series was cancelled.

Although the fictional setting for the show was in Texas, according to Rick Ford's biography in IMDb, scenes within the Ritz theatre were actually filmed inside an old movie house in Elizabeth, New Jersey.

== Popular culture influences ==
A screenshot of the fictional Ritz theater used as a commercial bumper for selected commercial breaks.

Overall, the Canned Film Festival can best be described as a curtailed advertising experiment by the Dallas-based Dr Pepper Company to break into the late-night television market in 1986, as the anticipated second season never materialized. It never gained the cult status that Mystery Science Theater 3000 did, nor did it match the Max Headroom advertising campaign run by the rival Coca-Cola Company in the 1980s (although coincidentally, Max Headroom itself was also a television series which lasted only a short time in the 1980s).

Those who remember the Canned Film Festival might recall the numerous Dr. Pepper television commercials aired concurrently with the show. These included the post-apocalyptic and cyberpunk-toned "Planet Dullzon" and "Cola Wars" ads alluding to (but never directly addressed) the Coke/Pepsi rivalry, mentioning only an Orwellian syndicate which manufactured a soft drink named "Clone Cola". At least two of the "Planet Dullzon" commercials incorporated alien bar scenes reminiscent of the famous "cantina scene" from Star Wars Episode IV: A New Hope, and most of them included a Han Solo-like main character wearing a cowboy hat and accompanied by a short alien sidekick. Also aired were the Japanese-inspired Godzilla commercials, in which the famous B-movie creature and his female counterpart craved billboard-sized cans of Dr. Pepper as a libation against destroying the city they were attacking. Perhaps motivated by the movie 2001: A Space Odyssey (or its more recent 1984 sequel, 2010), a Diet Dr. Pepper commercial was aired during the series which included a monolithic-type alien spacecraft visiting a rural trailer-home couple in search of intelligent life. Insulted by the country-folks' offer of a simple diet cola, a flash of light from the alien converted them to English-accented intellectuals wielding Diet Dr. Pepper bottles, and transformed their tasteless lawn ornaments to modern abstract art sculptures. Aside from providing advertisement for the show's main sponsor, the subtle movie references contained in these commercials may be another reason why they were aired alongside the Canned Film Festival.

The series may also be remembered as one of the many little-known works of Laraine Newman's acting career. While she performed in countless supporting roles throughout Hollywood following her tenure on NBC's Saturday Night Live, her work with the Canned Film Festival is rarely credited. The careers of other noteworthy stars also include this show, such as Kathryn Rossetter who played support roles in movies, electronic media (video games), and television shows such as Law & Order, Cosby, Touched by an Angel, L.A. Law, and Kate & Allie. Patrick Garner, in addition to appearing in a myriad of TV commercial ads, also made cameos in television shows such as Monsters, Chappelle's Show, and Law & Order, and more recently in theatre, starred as Mr. Cunningham in the Broadway version of Happy Days The Musical. Rick Ford (identified as F. Richards Ford in the series credits) made appearances in episodes of Married... with Children and Mama's Family as well as movies like The Tattoo Chase and the Oscar-nominated 12:01 PM, and is also very active in regional and professional theatre. Laura Galusha's acting career seemed to be brief, as she is recorded to have appeared on screen only once in an episode of CBS Schoolbreak Special in 1985, whereas Phil Nee (identified as Philip Nee in the series credits), in addition to working behind the camera as a writer and technical crew, has performed several cameos over the years following the series in both movies and television.

The Canned Film Festival's genre-based similarity to Mystery Science Theater 3000 (MST3K) did not stop with the show format. Following its 1988 debut, MST3K featured many of the same films as the Canned Film Festival did two years earlier in 1986. While this coincidence might suggest that the Canned Film Festival was a source of inspiration for MST3K's creator, Joel Hodgson, such assertions would be false. In fact, Hodgson states that his vision for MST3K actually came from the 1978 CBS Children's Film Festival instead. Either way, due to its 11-season run (as opposed to the single season Canned Film Festival) it is clear that MST3K was much more successful in the B movie satire genre despite the lack of a large sponsor like the Dr Pepper Company. However, it is also possible that its success over the Canned Film Festival was due to it reaching a wider audience through the then-nascent cable TV market, and aired at more suitable hours for its intended audience.

== Episode list ==
The following is an episode list for The Canned Film Festival. 13 episodes were produced, and due to the nationally syndicated nature of the program, exact air dates for local television broadcasts are not precisely known. Generally, the program aired on the weekends during the late night time slot on both independent stations and network affiliates from June through September 1986. The list below is in order of the original air date listed on the Internet Movie Database using the name of the featured B movie as the episode title, as no other naming format was suggested during the program run.

No.	Title	Original release date
1	The Terror of Tiny Town	June 21, 1986
2	Doctor of Doom	June 28, 1986
3	Ski Fever	July 5, 1986
4	Santa Claus Conquers the Martians	July 12, 1986
5	Robot Monster	July 19, 1986
Laraine prints movie fliers for the featured film while theater patrons mistakenly expect a film called Dog of Norway.
6	The Crawling Hand	July 26, 1986
7	They Saved Hitler's Brain	August 2, 1986
8	Untamed Women	August 9, 1986
9	Bride of the Monster	August 16, 1986
With Jack absent, Becky re-thinks their relationship while the group collectively dons Tor Johnson masks after getting a rare glimpse of Laraine's mother.
10	The Las Vegas Hillbillys	August 23, 1986
11	Project Moonbase	August 30, 1986
Becky, inspired by the feature film's female lead, spurns Jack's advances while Chan takes a spin in a lobby clothes dryer.
12	Rocket Attack U.S.A.	September 6, 1986
Laraine and Doris track down mysteriously missing socks that disappeared during laundry cycles, but Fitzy and the others blame Laraine's mom.
13	The Slime People	September 13, 1986

== See also ==
- Disasterpiece Theatre
- Svengoolie
