= Inter Nos =

1982 film

- Directed by: Hrafn Gunnlaugsson
- Starring: Benedikt Árnason
- Cinematography: Karl Oskarsson
- Release date: 14 August 1982
- Running time: 91 minutes
- Country: Iceland
- Language: Icelandic

Inter Nos (Icelandic: Okkar á milli: Í hita og þunga dagsins; lit. "Between Us: In the Heat and Weight of the Day") is a 1982 Icelandic drama film directed by Hrafn Gunnlaugsson. It was selected as the Icelandic entry for the Best Foreign Language Film at the 55th Academy Awards, but was not accepted as a nominee. Einar Örn Benediktsson's dad, Benedikt Árnason plays the main role.

== Cast ==
- Benedikt Árnason
- Andrea Oddsteinsdóttir
- Júlíus Hjörleifsson
- Margrét Gunnlaugsdóttir
- Maria Ellingsen
- Sirry Steffen
- Valgarður Guðjónsson
- Þorvaldur S. Þorvaldsson

== See also ==
- List of submissions to the 55th Academy Awards for Best Foreign Language Film
- List of Icelandic submissions for the Academy Award for Best Foreign Language Film
