= Hills of Utah =

1951 film by John English

- Directed by: John English
- Written by: Gerald Geraghty; Les Savage Jr.
- Produced by: Armand Schaefer
- Starring: Gene Autry; Elaine Riley; Donna Martell
- Cinematography: William Bradford
- Edited by: James Sweeney
- Music by: Mischa Bakaleinikoff
- Production company: Gene Autry Productions
- Distributed by: Columbia Pictures
- Release date: September 30, 1951
- Running time: 70 minutes
- Country: United States
- Language: English

Hills of Utah is a 1951 American Western film directed by John English and starring Gene Autry, Elaine Riley and Donna Martell. The film's sets were designed by the art director Charles Clague.

== Plot ==
In the frontier town of Coffin Gap, Utah, a long-running feud simmers between the copper miners and cattle ranchers. A stream which runs through the center of town is poisoned by the miners, which in turn poisons the cows. Dr. Gene Autry, a traveling doctor, is caught in the middle of the feud, shot at by both groups, and must use his fighting skills to bring peace to the town.

== Cast ==
- Gene Autry as Dr. Gene Autry
- Elaine Riley as Karen McQueen
- Donna Martell as Nola French
- Onslow Stevens as Jayda McQueen
- Denver Pyle as Bowie French
- William Fawcett as Washoe
- Harry Lauter as Evan Fox - Henchman
- Kenne Duncan as Indigo Hubbard - Henchman
- Pat Buttram as Dusty Cosgrove

== Bibliography ==
- Pitts, Michael R. Western Movies: A Guide to 5,105 Feature Films. McFarland, 2012.
