= Project Moonbase =

1953 film by Richard Talmadge

- Theatrical release poster
- Directed by: Richard Talmadge
- Screenplay by: Robert A. Heinlein; Jack Seaman
- Story by: Robert A. Heinlein; Jack Seaman
- Produced by: Jack Seaman
- Starring: Ross Ford; Donna Martell; Hayden Rorke; Larry Johns; Herb Jacobs; Barbara Morrison; Ernestine Barrier
- Cinematography: William C. Thompson
- Edited by: Roland Gross
- Music by: Herschel Burke Gilbert
- Production company: Galaxy Pictures Inc.
- Distributed by: Lippert Pictures
- Release date: September 4, 1953 (United States)
- Running time: 63 minutes
- Country: United States
- Language: English

Project Moonbase (a.k.a. Project Moon Base) is a 1953 independently made black-and-white science fiction film, produced by Jack Seaman, directed by Richard Talmadge, and starring Ross Ford, Donna Martell, and Hayden Rorke. It co-stars Larry Johns, Herb Jacobs, Barbara Morrison, and Ernestine Barrier. The film was distributed by Lippert Pictures and is based on a story by Robert A. Heinlein, who shares the screenwriting credit with producer Jack Seaman.

Project Moonbase is unusual for its time in attempting to portray space travel in a "realistic" manner and for depicting a future in which women hold positions of authority and responsibility equal to men; as an example, the President of the United States is a woman. However, Colonel Briteis, the female commander of the Moon mission, is shown to be picked for her gender, generally shown as a member of a "weaker sex", and even threatened with a spanking by her commanding officer (not helped by the fact that her last name is pronounced "Bright Eyes").

Mystery Science Theater 3000 featured the film in January 1990 as an episode during its first season on The Comedy Channel. It had been originally broadcast in 1986 as a syndicated television episode of the Canned Film Festival.

== Plot ==
In a future 1970, the United States is considering building bases on the Moon. Colonel Briteis, Major Bill Moore, and Doctor Wernher are sent to orbit the Moon to survey landing sites for future lunar missions. However, Wernher is an impostor whose secret mission is to destroy the US's Earth-orbiting space station, which he plans to do by colliding the rocket with the station on the way back from the Moon. Col. Briteis, who made the first orbital flight around the Earth four years earlier, is arrogant and distrusting of Major Moore. Moore, in turn had a romantic interest in Briteis when they began in the United States Space Force, but was rejected in favor of Briteis's ambition to be the first person on the Moon.

Moore realizes that the man claiming to be Wernher is actually a spy for an unnamed country, because the impostor has no knowledge of Wernher's expertise nor of the Brooklyn Dodgers, despite having supposedly taught in Brooklyn. In the ensuing struggle for control of the rocket, Colonel Briteis accidentally hits the boosters, which saves their lives but leaves the ship critically low on fuel. She takes unfair blame which Moore assures her is not her fault. Briteis then realizes she may not have all the answers and does need Moore's help on the mission. They are forced to make an emergency landing on the Moon, and with them all marooned the fake Wernher redeems himself by helping Moore establish communications with Earth, although an accident results in his untimely death.

In response to the unexpected turn of events, the US authorities decide to make the immobilized spaceship the core of a Moon base. Later General Greene has a man-to-man talk with Moore about his feelings for Briteis. Greene observes that Briteis and Moore will be isolated for weeks or months—perhaps even years—and public opinion, the USSF and the President would want them to be married. Moore expresses doubts about her feelings for him, and tells Green, "she has no use for me." Briteis, after overhearing this, secretly agrees to marry Moore and she cuts a deal with Greene to promote Moore to brigadier general and in command of Project Moonbase to make up for her earlier actions towards him.

After a video wedding officiated by a USSF chaplain, and witnessed by Greene, Briteis pins a paper star on Moore, thereby indicating his new rank of Brigadier General, one above her rank of Colonel. The couple then kisses, thereby signaling the beginning of their married life.

== Cast ==
- Donna Martell as Colonel Briteis
- Hayden Rorke as General "Pappy" Greene
- Ross Ford as Major Bill Moore
- Larry Johns as Doctor Wernher
- Herb Jacobs as Mr. Roundtree
- Barbara Morrison as Polly Prattles
- Ernestine Barrier as Madame President
- James Craven as Commodore Carlson
- John Hedloe as Adjutant
- Peter Adams as Captain Carmody

== Production and release ==
Both Project Moonbase and Cat-Women of the Moon (also 1953) were made using some of the same sets and costumes. The two films were released within one day of each other, though from different distributors.

Project Moonbase was shot in 10 days.

== Mystery Science Theater 3000 ==
Project Moonbase was featured in episode #109 of Mystery Science Theater 3000 along with Chapters 7 and 8 of Radar Men from the Moon, a Commando Cody serial. The episode debuted January 6, 1990, on the Comedy Channel. Kevin Murphy, who worked on the show and would become a cast member the next season, wrote, "The best thing I can say about it is that it was very very short," calling the film "openly and condescendingly hostile toward women as a gender".

As with most first-season episodes of Mystery Science Theater 3000, Project Moonbase is not considered one of the series' better efforts; it did not make their Top 100 list, as voted upon by MST3K Season 11 Kickstarter backers. Writer Jim Vorel ranked the episode highest of all the first-season episodes, although the ranking of #170 out of 197 MST3K episodes from the first twelve seasons is still very low. Vorel writes, "There's some glimmers of later-season MST3k goodness in there." Project Moonbase itself, according to Vorel, "is a fun, breezy, battery-shaped spaceship-cruising sci-fi adventure with cheesy costumes and flimsy sets."

The MST3K version of Project Moonbase was included as part of the Mystery Science Theater 3000 Volume XX DVD collection, released by Shout! Factory in March 2011. The other episodes in the four-disc set include Master Ninja I (episode #320), Master Ninja II (episode #324), and The Magic Voyage of Sinbad (episode #505).

== See also ==
- List of films featuring space stations
