= Miss International 1960 =

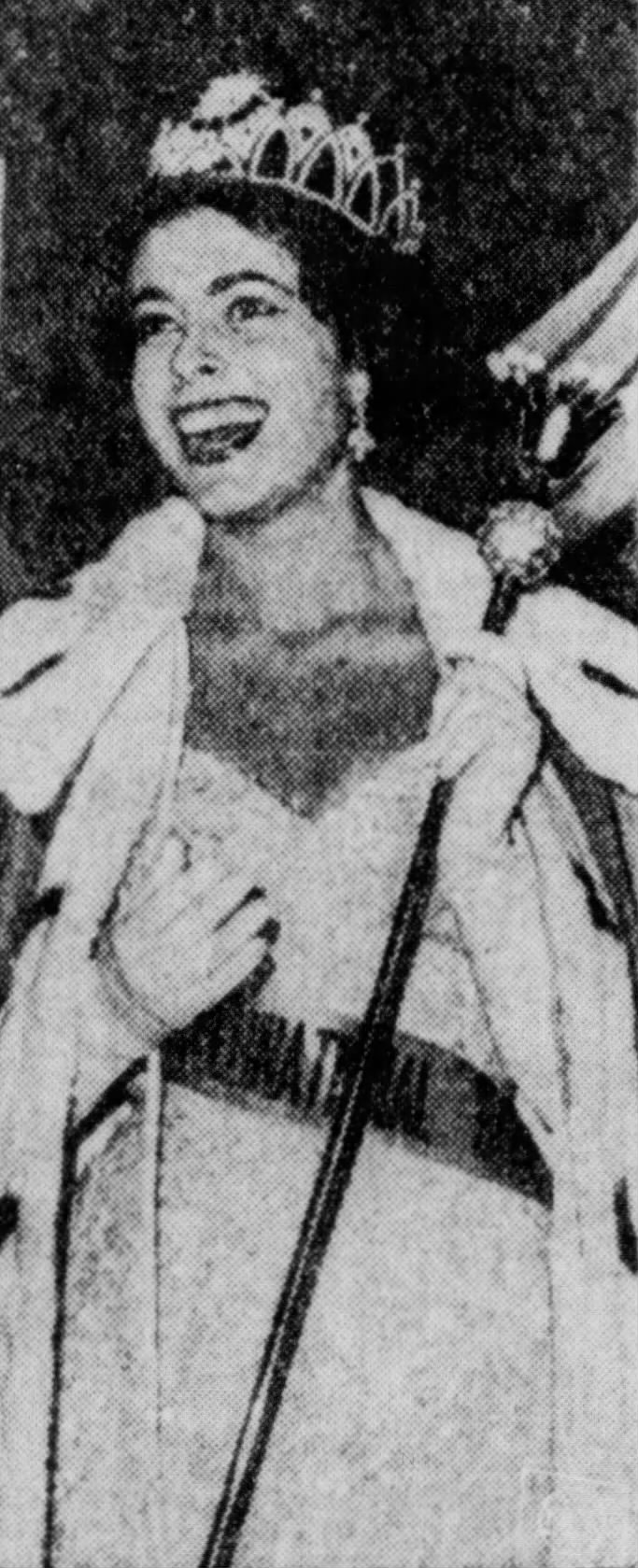
- Stella Marquez
- Date: August 12, 1960
- Presenters: Byron Palmer
- Venue: Long Beach Municipal Auditorium, Long Beach, California, United States
- Entrants: 52
- Placements: 15
- Debuts: Argentina; Australia; Austria; Belgium; Bolivia; Brazil; British Guiana; Canada; Ceylon; China; Colombia; Denmark; Ecuador; England; Finland; France; Greece; Holland; Hong Kong; Iceland; India; Indonesia; Israel; Italy; Japan; Jordan; Lebanon; Luxembourg; Malaya; Morocco; North Borneo; Norway; Paraguay; Peru; Philippines; Poland; Portugal; Puerto Rico; Singapore; South Africa; South Korea; South Pacific; Spain; Sweden; Switzerland; Tahiti; Tunisia; Turkey; United States; Uruguay; Venezuela; West Germany
- Winner: Stella Márquez; Colombia
- Congeniality: Julia Ann Adamson; British Guiana
- Photogenic: Sigridur Geirsdottir; Iceland

Miss International 1960 was the first edition of the Miss International pageant, held at the Long Beach Municipal Auditorium in Long Beach, California, United States, on 12 August 1960. The new pageant was created due to internal conflicts within the Miss Universe pageant.

At the end of the event, Stella Márquez of Colombia was crowned as the first Miss International. It is the first victory of Colombia in the pageant's history, although later they would win in 1999, 2004 and the recent edition in 2025.

Contestants from fifty-two countries and territories competed in this year's pageant. The pageant was hosted by Byron Palmer.

== Background ==
=== Location and date ===
On 7 October 1959, Hank Meyer, city publicity director of Miami Beach, announced that the tenth anniversary of the Miss Universe pageant would be held in Miami Beach, Florida, instead of Long Beach, California in the United States. According to the Long Beach Beauty Congress, the competition had become "too commercialized" after the 1959 competition, leading them to withdraw their support for the pageant. This decision led to the creation of a new beauty pageant by the Long Beach Beauty Congress. Later, this contest was named the International Beauty Congress, which is now known as Miss International.

=== Selection of participants ===
Contestants from fifty-two countries and territories were selected to compete in the pageant. Two contestants were selected to replace the original dethroned winners.

==== Replacements and withdrawals ====
Miss Denmark, Antje Moller, was disqualified after it was discovered that she is only 16, and was replaced by her runner-up, Sonja Menzel.

== Results ==
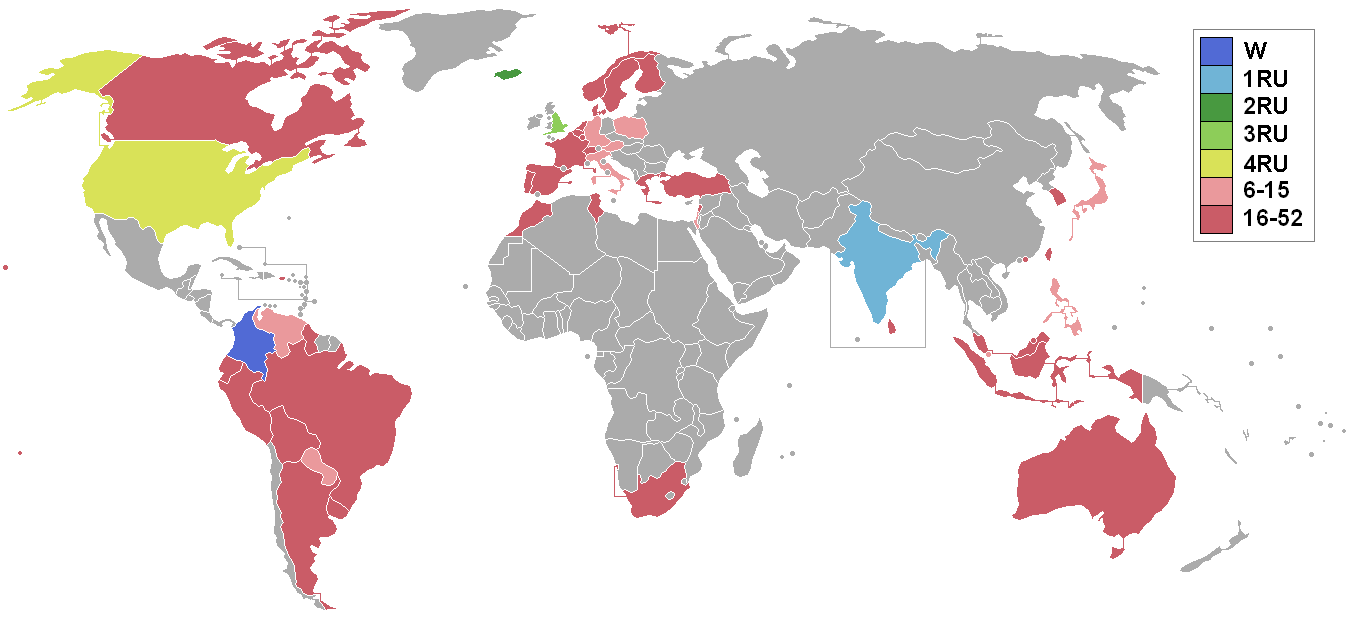
Miss International 1960 participating nations and results

=== Placements ===
| Placement | Contestant |
|---|---|
| Miss International 1960 | Colombia – Stella Márquez |
| 1st Runner-Up | India – Iona Pinto |
| 2nd Runner-Up | Iceland – Sigridur Geirsdóttir |
| 3rd Runner-Up | England – Joyce Kay |
| 4th Runner-Up | United States – Charlene Lundberg |
| Top 15 | Austria – Elizabeth Hodacs; Israel – Lili Dajani; Italy – Maria Jacomell; Japan – Michiko Takagi; Paraguay – Gretel Carvallo; Philippines – Edita Resurreccion Vital; Poland – Marzena Malinowska; Singapore – Christl D'Cruz; Venezuela – Gladys Ascanio; West Germany – Helga Kirsch |

Special Awards
| Awards | Contestant |
|---|---|
| Miss Friendship | British Guiana – Julia Ann Adamson |
| Miss Photogenic | Iceland – Sigridur Geirsdóttir |
| Miss Popularity | Belgium – Caroline Lecerf (Note: Voted by parade viewers.) |

Preliminary Competition Winners
| Awards | Contestant |
|---|---|
| Best in Playsuit | Day 1: Iceland – Sigridur Geirsdóttir; Day 2: England – Joyce Kay; Day 3: United States – Charlene Lundberg |
| Best in Evening Gown | Day 1: Colombia – Stella Márquez; Day 2: Poland – Marzena Malinowska; Day 3: Norway – Lise Hammer |
| Best National Costume | Day 1: Venezuela – Gladys Ascanio; Day 2: Iceland – Sigridur Geirsdóttir; Day 3: Ceylon – Yvonne Gunawardene |

== Contestants ==
- Argentina – Slavica Lazaric
- Australia – Joan Stanbury
- Austria – Elizabeth Hodacs
- Belgium – Caroline Lecerf
- Bolivia – Edmy Arana Ayala
- Brazil – Magda Renate Pfrimer
- British Guiana – Julia Ann Adamson
- Canada – Margaret Powell
- Ceylon – Yvonne Eileen Gunawardene
- Colombia – Stella Márquez
- Denmark – Sonja Menzel
- Ecuador – Magdalena Dávila Varela
- England – Joyce Kay
- Finland – Marketta Nieminen
- France – Yvette Suzanne Degrémont
- Greece – Kiki Kotsaridou
- Holland – Katinka Bleeker
- Hong Kong – Lena Woo
- Iceland – Sigridur Geirsdóttir
- India – Iona Pinto
- Indonesia – Wiana Sulastini
- Israel – Lili Dajani
- Italy – Maria Grazia Jacomelli
- Japan – Michiko Takagi
- Jordan – Gulnar Tucktuck
- Lebanon – Juliana Reptsik
- Luxembourg – Liliane Mueller
- Malaya – Zanariak Zena Ahmad
- Morocco – Raymonde Valle
- North Borneo – Elizabeth Voon
- Norway – Lise Hammer
- Paraguay – Gretel Hedger Carvallo
- Peru – Irma Vargas Fuller
- Philippines – Edita Resurreccion Vital
- Poland – Marzena Malinowska
- Portugal – Maria Josabete Silva Santos
- Puerto Rico – Carmen Sara Latimer
- Singapore – Christl D'Cruz
- South Africa – Nona Sherriff
- South Korea – Kim Chung-ja
- South Pacific – Patricia Apoliona (from Honolulu)
- Spain – Elena Herrera Dávila-Núñez
- Sweden – Gunilla Elm
- Switzerland – Mylene Delapraz
- Tahiti – Teura Marguerite Teuira
- Taiwan – Janet Lin Chin-Yi (Note: Chin-Yi competed as "Miss China".)
- Tunisia – Habiba Ben Abdallah
- Turkey – Guler Kivrak
- United States – Charlene Lundberg
- Uruguay – Beatriz Liñares
- Venezuela – Gladys Ascanio
- West Germany – Helga Kirsch

=== Did not compete ===
- Hawaii – Gordean Leilehua Lee (withdrew)
- Yugoslavia – Tania Velic
