= Zemplínska Nová Ves =

Village and municipality in Slovakia

Zemplínska Nová Ves Zemplénújfalu
- Municipality
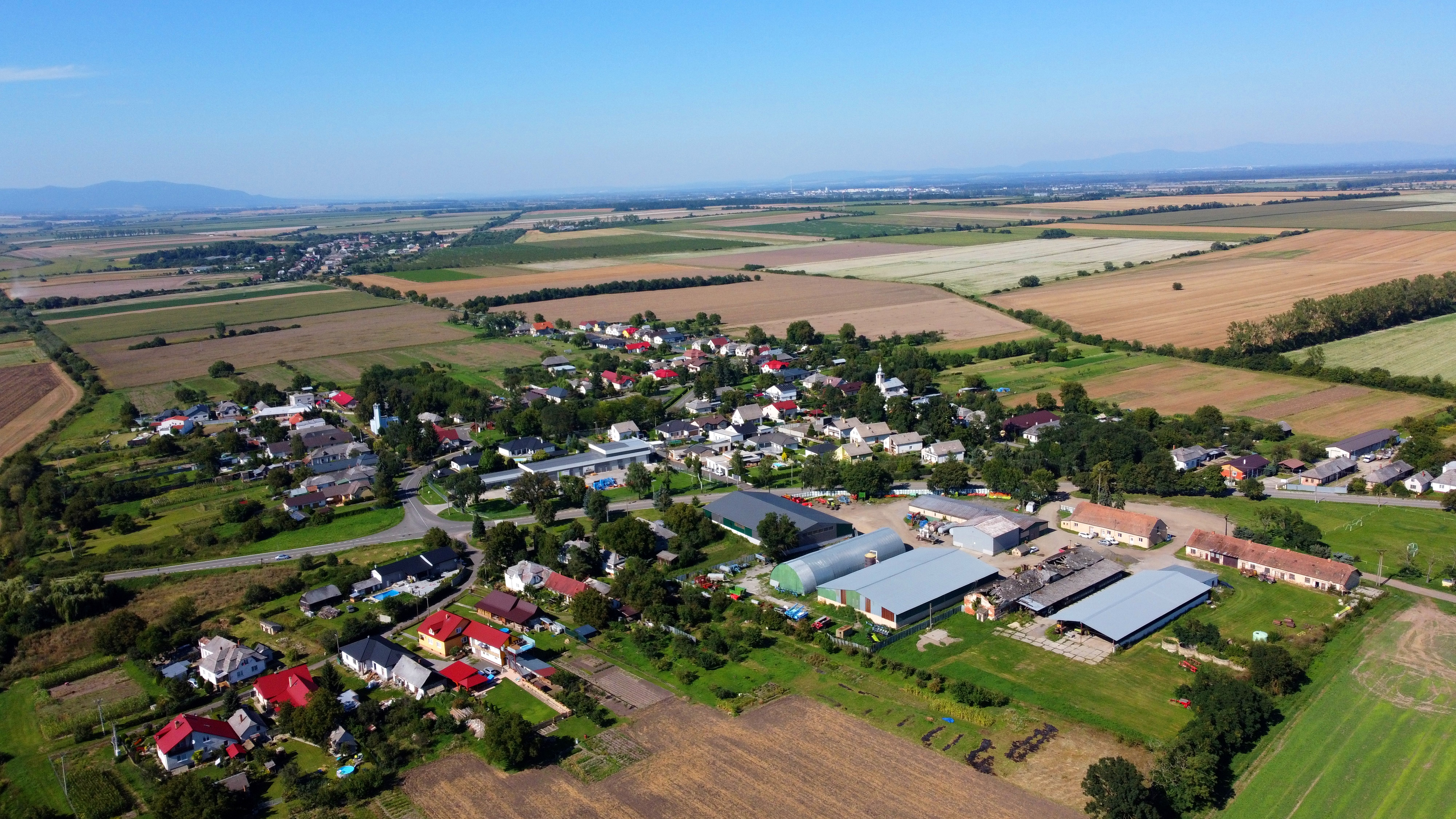

- Flag

- Location of Zemplínska Nová Ves in the Košice Region Location of Zemplínska Nová Ves in Slovakia
- Coordinates: 48.57°N 21.67°E
- Country: Slovakia
- Region: Košice Region
- District: Trebišov District
- First mentioned: 1263

Area
  - Total: 10.70 km^{2} (4.13 sq mi)
- Elevation: 122 m (400 ft)

Population (2025)
  - Total: 939
- Time zone: UTC+1 (CET)
  - Summer (DST): UTC+2 (CEST)
- Postal code: 761 6
- Area code: +421 56
- Vehicle registration plate (until 2022): TV
- Website: www.znves.sk

Zemplínska Nová Ves (Hungarian: Zemplénújfalu) is a village and municipality in the Trebišov District in the Košice Region of south-eastern Slovakia. The village consist of parts: the first named Úpor and the second which name is Zemplinský Klečenov.

== History ==
In historical records the village was first mentioned in 1263.

== Geography ==
The municipality lies at an altitude of 122 metres (400 ft) and covers an area of 10.70 km^{2} (4.13 sq mi) (2025).

== Population ==
Population statistic (10 years)
| Year | 1995 | 2005 | 2015 | 2025 |
|---|---|---|---|---|
| Count | 895 | 964 | 893 | 939 |
| Difference | | +7.70% | −7.36% | +5.15% |

Population statistic
| Year | 2024 | 2025 |
|---|---|---|
| Count | 926 | 939 |
| Difference | | +1.40% |

It has a population of 939 people (31 December 2025).

=== Ethnicity ===
Census 2021 (1+ %)
| Ethnicity | Number | Fraction |
|---|---|---|
| Slovak | 830 | 90.21% |
| Not found out | 88 | 9.56% |
| Total | 920 | |

In year 2021 was 920 people by ethnicity 830 as Slovak, 88 as Not found out, 4 as Czech, 4 as Hungarian, 1 as Romani and 1 as Other.

Note on population: The difference values of population numbers in the table "Population statistic" and in the sections "Ethnicity" & "Religion" is caused by the use of various statistical methods.

=== Religion ===
Census 2021 (1+ %)
| Religion | Number | Fraction |
|---|---|---|
| Roman Catholic Church | 349 | 37.93% |
| Greek Catholic Church | 313 | 34.02% |
| Not found out | 83 | 9.02% |
| None | 76 | 8.26% |
| Calvinist Church | 32 | 3.48% |
| Eastern Orthodox Church | 27 | 2.93% |
| Jehovah's Witnesses | 13 | 1.41% |
| Apostolic Church | 11 | 1.2% |
| Total | 920 | |

In year 2021 was 920 people by religion 349 from Roman Catholic Church, 313 from Greek Catholic Church, 83 from Not found out, 76 from None, 32 from Calvinist Church, 27 from Eastern Orthodox Church, 13 from Jehovah's Witnesses, 11 from Apostolic Church, 6 from Other, 5 from Evangelical Church, 3 from Ad hoc movements, 1 from Other and not ascertained christian church and 1 from Seventh-day Adventist Church.

== Facilities ==
The village has a public library and a football pitch.
