= Graciela Soto =

Mexican model

- Born: Graciela Soto Cámara; Morelos
- Other name: Graciela Soto
- Beauty pageant titleholder
- Title: Nuestra Belleza Int'l México 1999
- Major competitions: Nuestra Belleza México 1999 (2nd runner-up) (Nuestra Belleza Int'l México 1999); Miss International 1999

Graciela Soto Cámara is a Mexican model and beauty pageant titleholder who represented her country at Miss International 1999.

== Nuestra Belleza Mexico ==
Born in Morelos and raised in Cuernavaca, Soto competed against thirty-two other contestants for the national beauty title of Mexico, Nuestra Belleza México, held in Pachuca, Hidalgo in September 1999.

== Miss International 1999 ==
Despite not winning her country's national title, she was chosen to represent Mexico in the 1999 Miss International pageant, held on 14 December 1999 at Tokyo's U-Port Hall, where she was a favorite to win the Best National Costume award.

Awards and achievements
Preceded by Lynette Delgado	Nuestra Belleza Internacional México; 1999	Succeeded by Leticia Murray
