= St. Peter the Apostle Cathedral, Cali =

Coordinates: 3.4508°N 76.5324°W

St. Peter the Apostle Cathedral
- Catedral de San Pedro Apóstol
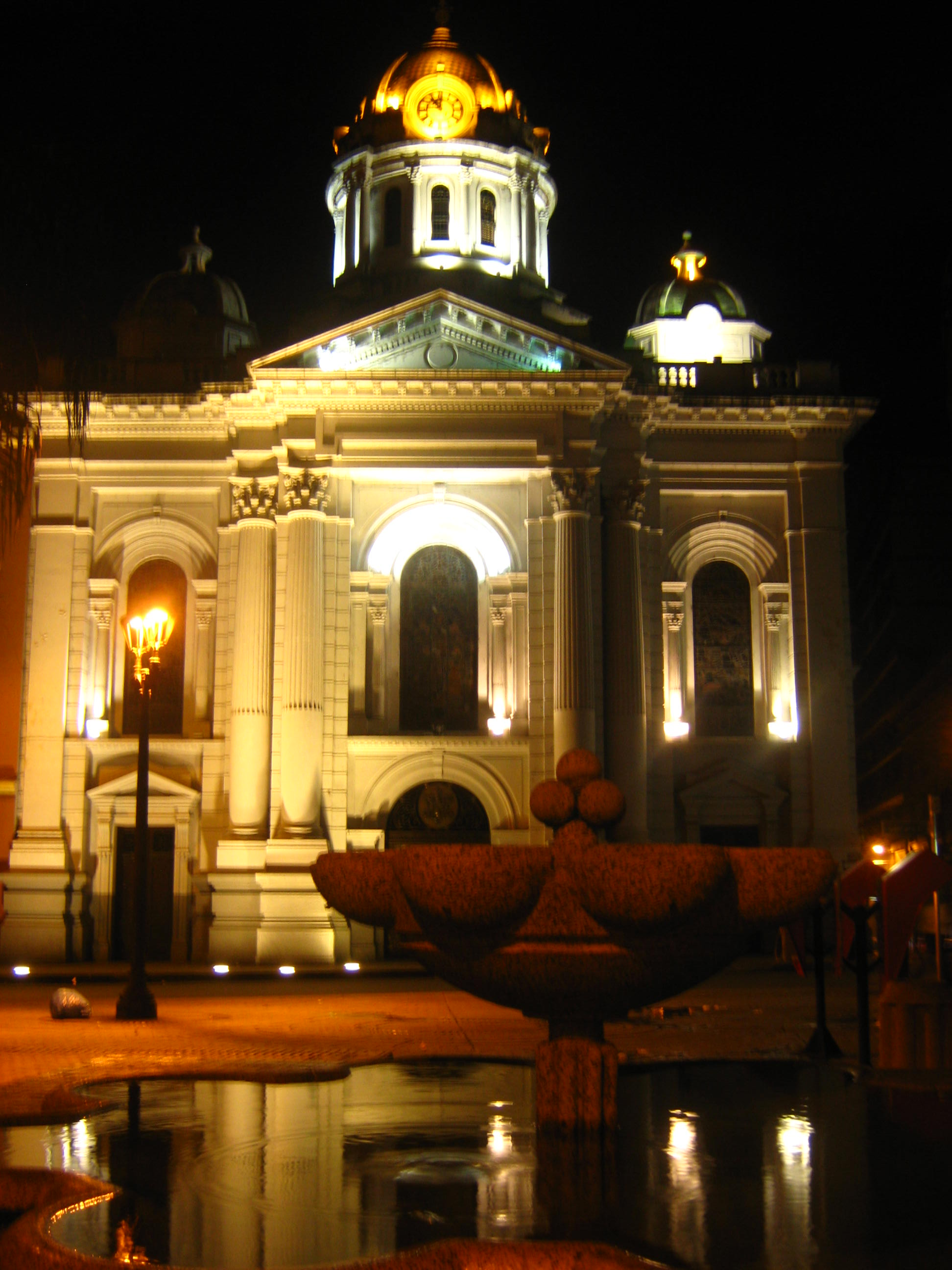
- St. Peter the Apostle Cathedral
- Location: Cali
- Country: Colombia
- Denomination: Roman Catholic Church

The Cathedral of St. Peter the Apostle in Cali (Spanish: Catedral de San Pedro Apóstol) also called the Metropolitan Cathedral of Cali or simply the Cali Cathedral, is the mother church of the city of Cali, Colombia, and the seat of the Roman Catholic Archdiocese of Cali. It is recognized as Architectural Heritage of Cali, and was declared a National Monument of Colombia by resolution 002 of 12 March 1982.

Its construction began the Baroque style, designed by the architect Antonio García. On 1 September 1772, parish priest José Rivera laid the first stone. Prisoners of local prisons were used for labor for construction. In 1802 the church was finished except for the tower. Due to political problems, construction was not completed until 1841, following neoclassical lines.

== See also ==
- Catholic Church in Colombia

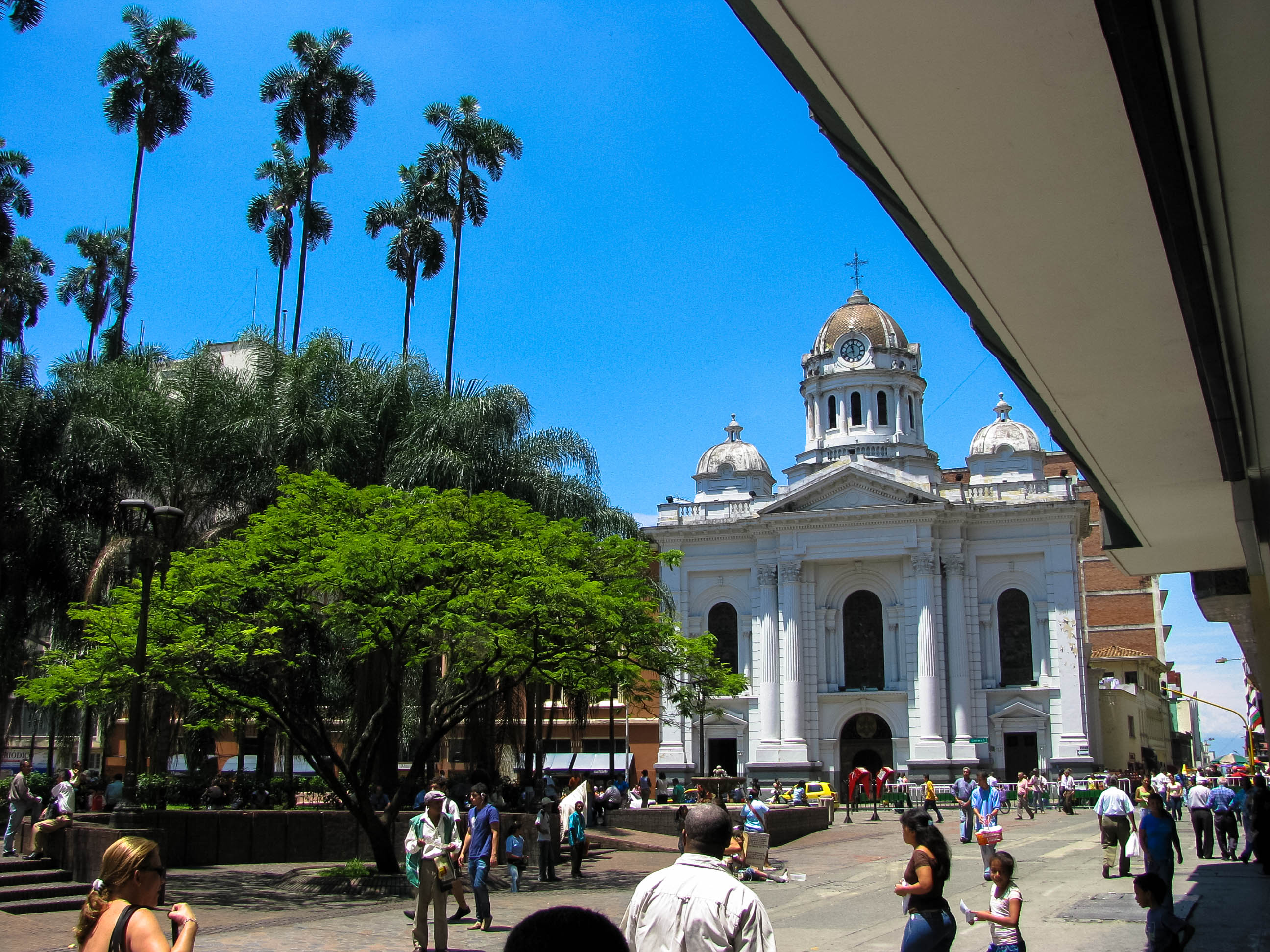
Another View
