= Miss International 2000 =

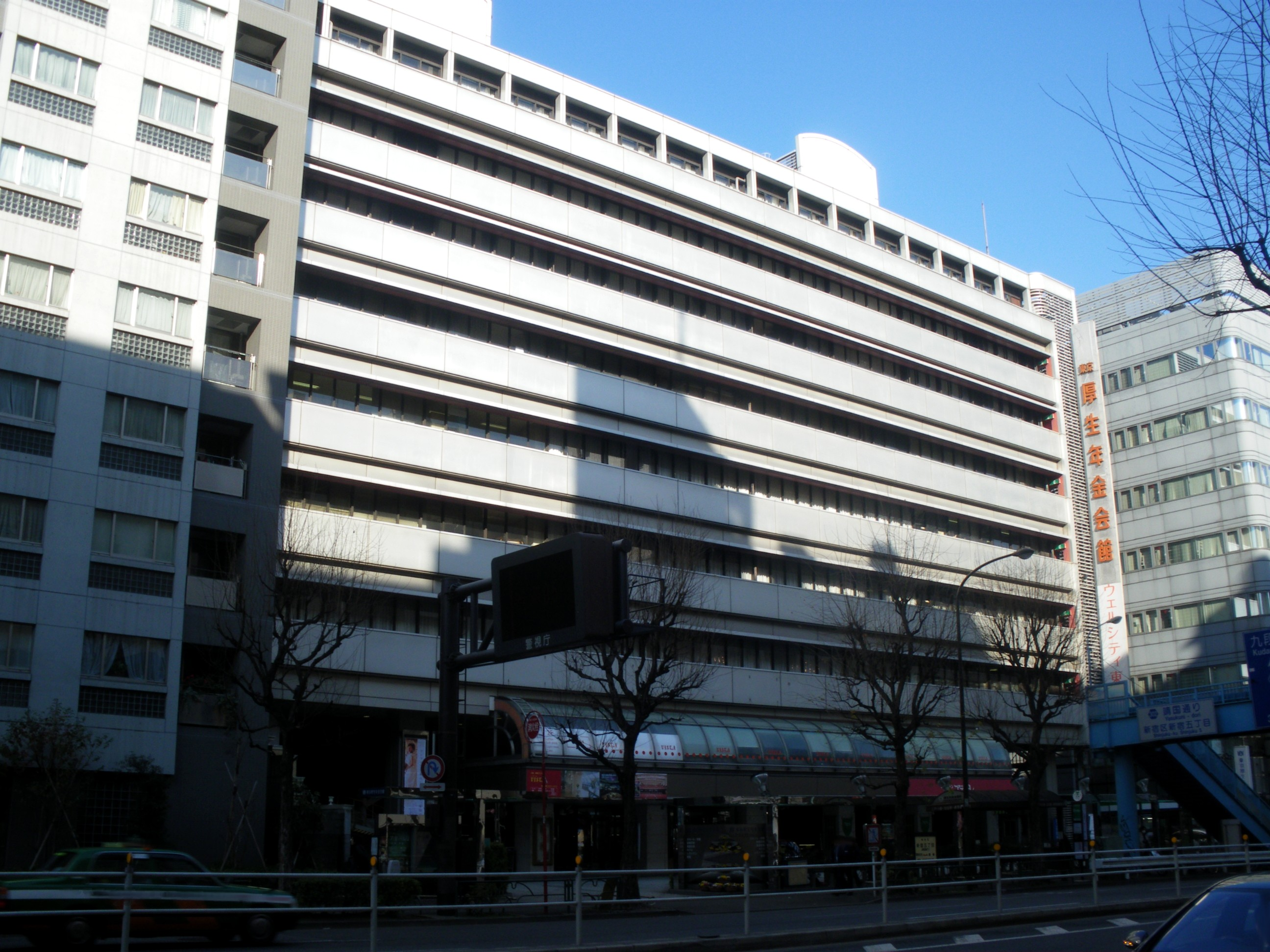
- Date: October 4, 2000
- Presenters: Masumi Okada
- Venue: Koseinenkin Hall, Tokyo, Japan
- Broadcaster: TV Tokyo
- Entrants: 56
- Placements: 15
- Debuts: San Marino
- Withdrawals: Côte d'Ivoire; Dominican Republic; Great Britain; Latvia; Northern Mariana Islands; Uruguay
- Returns: Canada; Honduras; Puerto Rico; South Africa; Sweden; Tahiti; Taiwan; Thailand
- Winner: Vivian Urdaneta; Venezuela

Miss International 2000, was the 40th Miss International pageant, held at the Koseinenkin Hall in Tokyo, Japan on 4 October 2000.

Vivian Urdaneta of Venezuela won and was crowned by Paulina Gálvez of Colombia. It is the third time Venezuela has won the pageant.

Contestants from fifty-six countries and territories participated in the pageant, which was hosted by Masumi Okada.

== Background ==
=== Selection of participants ===
==== Replacements ====
Lissette Blandón of Nicaragua was replaced by Marynes Argüello due to being overage.

==== Withdrawals ====
Nicola Jane Willoughby of the United Kingdom, Evanna Marting of the Dominican Republic, Inga Alspire of Latvia, Maria Leticia Alvarez of Paraguay, Claudia Neyra of Peru, and Alana Selby of Trinidad and Tobago withdrew due to undisclosed reasons.

== Results ==
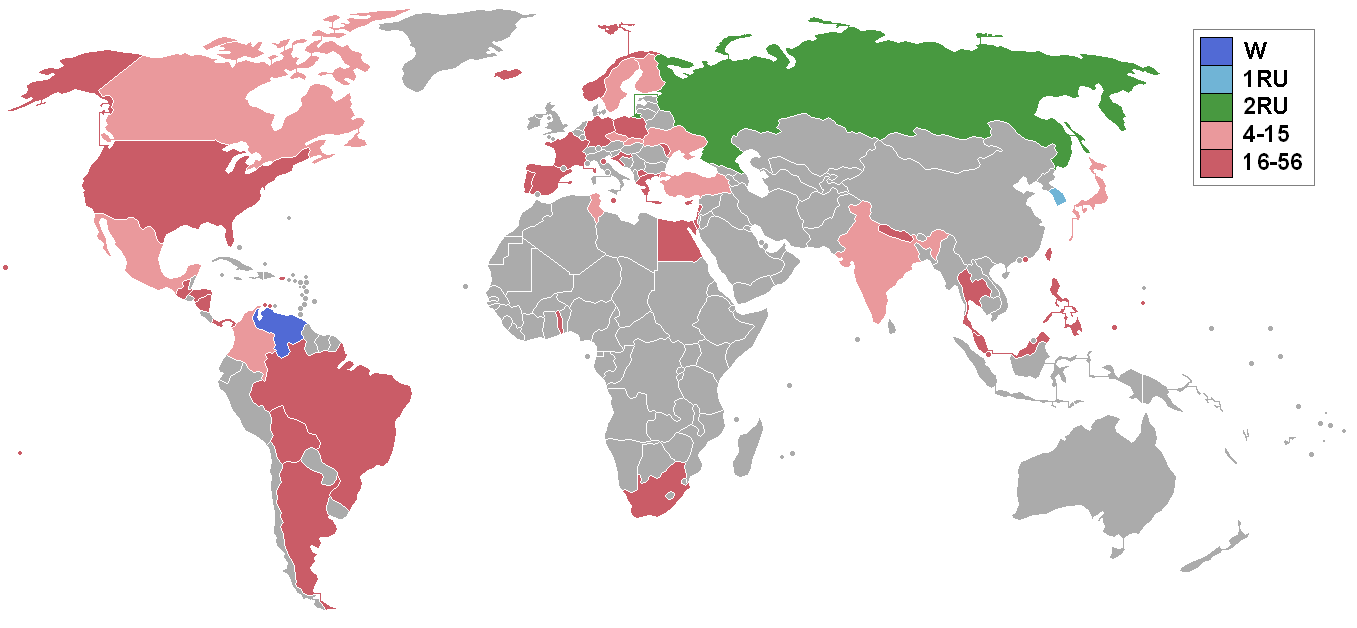
Miss International 2000 participating countries and territories

=== Placements ===
Placement	Contestant
Miss International 2000	Venezuela – Vivian Urdaneta
1st runner-up	South Korea – Son Tae-young
2nd runner-up	Russia – Svetlana Goreva
Top 15	Canada – Angeliki Lakouras; Colombia – Carolina Cruz; Czech Republic – Markéta Svobodná; Finland - Kati Nirkko; India – Gayatri Joshi; Japan – Kanako Shibata; Mexico – Leticia Murray; Slovakia – Michaela Strahlová; Sweden – Gabrielle Heinerborg; Tunisia – Ismahero Lahmar; Turkey – Hulya Karanlik; Ukraine – Yana Razumovska

=== Special awards ===
Awards	Contestant
Miss Friendship	Germany - Doreen Adler
Miss Photogenic	South Korea - Son Tae-young
Best National Costume	Aruba - Carolina Albertsz

== Contestants ==
Fifty-six contestants competed for the title.

Country/Territory	Contestant	Age (Note: Ages during the competition)	Hometown
Argentina	Natalia Cecilia Dalla	19	Buenos Aires
Aruba	Carolina Albertsz	20	Oranjestad
Bolivia	Catherine Villarroel	18	Santa Cruz de la Sierra
Brazil	Fernanda Schiavo	19	Ijuí
Canada	Angeliki Lakouras	22	–
Colombia	Carolina Cruz	21	Tuluá
Croatia	Ana Gruica	17	Zagreb
Curaçao	Roselle Angèle Augusta	21	Willemstad
Cyprus	Nikoletta Violari	20	Nicosia
Czech Republic	Markéta Svobodná	19	South Bohemia
Egypt	Hagar El Taher	23	Cairo
Finland	Kati Nirkko	21	Tampere
France	Tatiana Bouguer	23	Bormes-les-Mimosas
Germany	Doreen Adler	22	Berlin
Greece	Dimitra Kitsiou	22	Athens
Guam	Liza Marie Camacho	20	Hagåtña
Guatemala	Yazmin Di Maio	19	Guatemala City
Hawaii	Carly Makanani Ah Sing	18	Honolulu
Honduras	Alba Marcela Rubí	19	Yoro
Hong Kong	Edith Ho	22	Hong Kong
Iceland	Anna Lilja Björnsdóttir	19	Reykjavík
India	Gayatri Joshi	23	Nagpur
Israel	Dana Farkash	18	Jerusalem
Japan	Kanako Shibata	23	Hokkaido
Lebanon	Sahar Mahmoud Al-Ghazzawi	23	Beirut
Macedonia	Sanja Nikolic	18	Skopje
Malaysia	Aida Stannis Kazum	22	Sarawak
Malta	Dominique Desira	21	Valletta
Mexico	Leticia Murray	21	Hermosillo
Moldova	Elena Ungureanu	17	Chișinău
Nepal	Uma Bogati	23	Kathmandu
Nicaragua	Marynes Argüello	21	Managua
Norway	Frida Jonson	22	Oslo
Palau	Eloisa Dilbodel Senior	19	Koror
Panama	Cristina Sousa	19	Panama City
Philippines	Joanna Maria Peñaloza	21	Mandaluyong
Poland	Emilia Raszynska	22	Warmia-Masuria
Portugal	Tânia Isabel Campanacho Ferreira	18	Lisbon
Puerto Rico	Rosiveliz Díaz	20	San Juan
Russia	Svetlana Goreva	18	Moscow
San Marino	Chiara Valentini	21	San Marino
Singapore	Lorraine Mann	23	Singapore
Slovakia	Michaela Strählová	19	Bratislava
South Africa	Irmari Steyl	20	–
South Korea	Son Tae-young	19	Daegu
Spain	Raquel Rovira	19	Madrid
Sweden	Gabrielle Heinerborg	20	Stockholm
Tahiti	Hinarai Leboucher	20	Papeete
Taiwan	Chiang Hsin-Ting	21	Taipei
Thailand	Phongkajorn Sareeyawat	22	Bangkok
Togo	Pamela Agnélé Gunn	23	Lomé
Tunisia	Ismahero Lahmar	17	Tunis
Turkey	Hulya Karanlik	22	Istanbul
Ukraine	Yana Razumovska	18	Kyiv
United States	Kirstin Anne Cook	22	Miami
Venezuela	Vivian Urdaneta	21	Maracaibo
