= Vanessa López =

Mexican model and beauty pageant titleholder

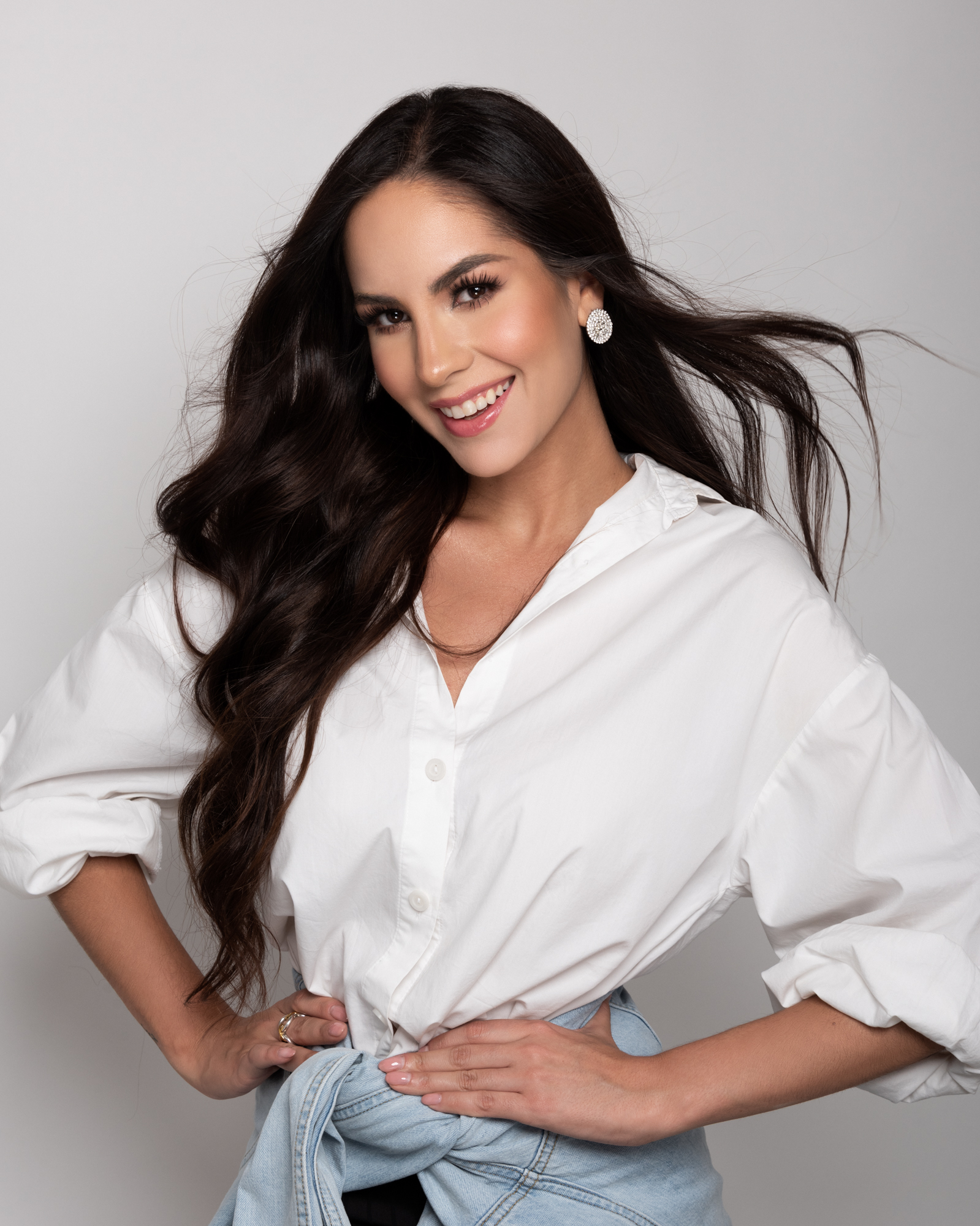
- López in 2023
- Born: Vanessa López Quijada; 24 December 1994 (age 31); Heroica Nogales, Sonora, Mexico
- Occupations: Model; Actress
- Height: 174 cm (5 ft 8 1/2 in)

Vanessa López Quijada (born December 24, 1994) is a Mexican model and beauty pageant titleholder. She represented Mexico at the Miss Supranational 2023 pageant where she placed top 12. López previously represented her country in Reina Hispanoamericana 2014 and finished as the Virreina Hispanoamericana.

== Pageant career ==
=== Nuestra Belleza México 2013 ===
López began her journey in beauty pageants at the age of 18, she was crowned Nuestra Belleza Sonora and competed in the Nuestra Belleza México 2013, held at the Presidential Hangar of Lic. Adolfo López Mateos International Airport in Toluca, State of Mexico on October 19, 2013 where she finished first runner-up.

=== Reina Hispanoamericana 2014 ===
López was selected to represented Mexico in the Reina Hispanoamericana 2014 pageant at Santa Cruz, Bolivia. While in concentration, she won Miss Photogenic and Amazonas Girl. On the coronation night on July 14, 2023 was announced as Virreina Hispanoamericana.

=== Miss México 2023 ===
Nine years later, López returned to the pageantry and joined the Miss México 2023 representing the state of Sonora, held at the Teatro Morelos, Morelia, Michoacán on April 15, 2023 where she was crowned as Miss Supranational Mexico 2023.

=== Miss Supranational 2023 ===
López represented Mexico and competed against 65 candidates from their respective countries/territories in the Miss Supranational 2023 pageant at Nowy Sącz, Poland. She was a finalist in the Miss Supra Influencer challenge placing in the top 7 of the pre-pageant event. On the coronation night on July 14, 2023, López advanced to the top 12 question and answer portion where all 12 contestants were asked to answer, "Why they should be the next brand ambassador of the Miss Supranational organization" in 20 seconds. She responded;

"Miss Supranational means we are being seen and valued by people all over the world and that makes me aware of the power of the crown. I am willing to continue inspiring women to become their best versión so that nothing and no one can ever bring us down."

Towards the end of the event, López finished in the top 12. Andrea Aguilera of Ecuador won the said pageant.

Awards and achievements
Preceded by (Dominican Republic) Yaritza Reyes	Virreina Hispanoamericana; 2014	Succeeded by (Aruba) Digene Zimmerman
Preceded by Gabriela Prieto	Reina Hispanoamericana México; 2014	Succeeded by Sandra Ahumada
Preceded by Regina González	Miss Supranational Mexico; 2023	Succeeded by Andrea Sáenz
