= Miss International 1999 =

- Date: December 14, 1999
- Presenters: Masumi Okada; Mari Christine
- Venue: U-Port Hall, Tokyo, Japan
- Broadcaster: TV Tokyo
- Entrants: 51
- Placements: 15
- Debuts: Egypt; Palau
- Withdrawals: Australia; Holland; Honduras; Paraguay; Peru
- Returns: Brazil; Côte d'Ivoire; Guam; Guatemala; Lebanon; Malaysia; Malta; Nicaragua; Russia; Ukraine; Uruguay
- Winner: Paulina Gálvez; Colombia
- Congeniality: Miyuki Hill; Northern Mariana Islands
- Photogenic: Paulina Gálvez; Colombia

Miss International 1999 was the 39th Miss International pageant, held at the U-Port Hall in Tokyo, Japan on 14 December 1999.

Paulina Gálvez of Colombia won and was crowned by Lía Borrero of Panama. It is the first victory of Colombia after 39 years, and their overall second victory in the pageant's history.

Contestants from fifty-one countries and territories participated in the pageant, which was hosted by Masumi Okada and Mari Christine.

== Background ==
=== Selection of participants ===
==== Replacements ====
Michelle Sablan of the Northern Mariana Islands was replaced by the first runner-up of Miss Marianas 1999, Miyuki Hill due to being overage. Binibining Pilipinas-Universe 1999, Janelle Bautista had to resign due to citizenship issues because she is an American citizen. Due to this, Binibining Pilipinas-World 1999, Miriam Quiambao assumed the aforementioned title, and Lalaine Edson, Binibining Pilipinas-International 1999, assumed the title of Quiambao. The title of Edson was then assumed by Georgina Sandico, one of the ten semi-finalists.

== Results ==
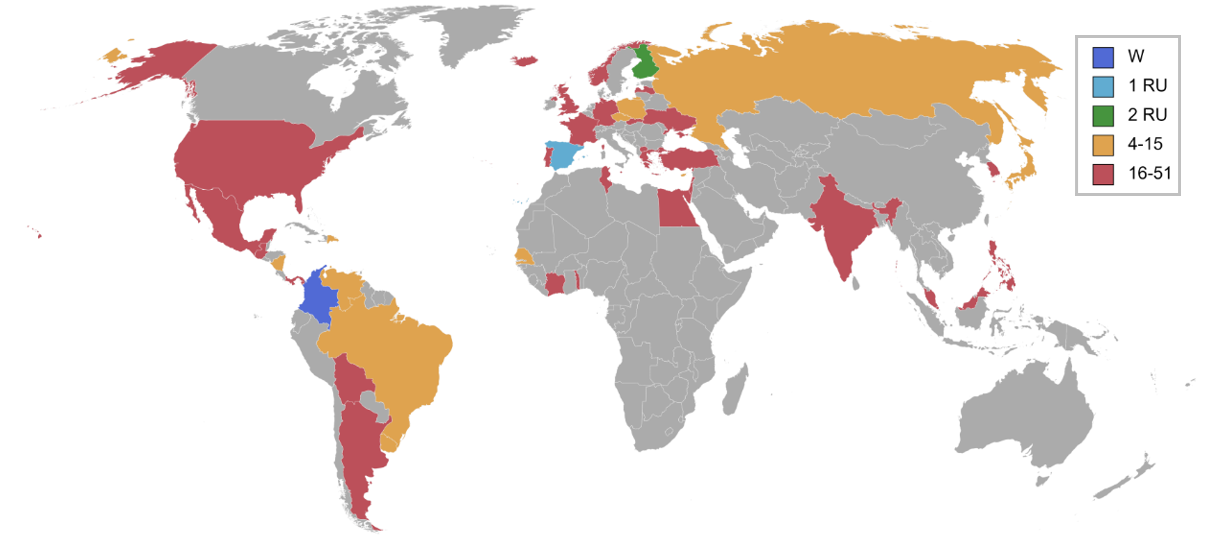
Miss International 1999 participating countries and territories.

=== Placements ===
Placement	Contestant
Miss International 1999	Colombia – Paulina Gálvez
1st Runner-Up	Spain – Carmen Fernández
2nd Runner-Up	Finland – Saija Palin
Top 15	Brazil – Alessandra do Nascimento; Curaçao – Pamela Winkel; Cyprus – Afroditi Pericleous; Czech Republic – Sárka Sikorova; Dominican Republic – Patsi Arias; Japan – Kana Onoda; Nicaragua – Claudia Alaniz; Poland – Adrianna Gerczew; Russia – Maria Tchebotkevitch; Senegal – Aïcha Faye; Uruguay – Daniela Abasolo; Venezuela – Andreína Llamozas

=== Special awards ===
Award	Contestant
Miss Friendship	Northern Mariana Islands – Miyuki Hill
Miss Photogenic	Colombia – Paulina Gálvez

== Contestants ==
Fifty-one contestants competed for the title.

Country/Territory	Contestant	Age (Note: Ages during the competition)	Hometown
Argentina	Elizabeth Contrard	18	Buenos Aires
Aruba	Cindy Vanessa Cam Lin Martinus	19	Oranjestad
Bolivia	Natalia Arteaga	19	Santa Cruz de la Sierra
Brazil	Alessandra do Nascimento	18	Frutal
Colombia	Paulina Gálvez	19	Cali
Côte d'Ivoire	Madaussou Kamara	19	Abidjan
Curaçao	Pamela Winkel	23	Willemstad
Cyprus	Afroditi Pericleous	20	Nicosia
Czech Republic	Šárka Sikorová	20	Prague
Dominican Republic	Patsi Arias	22	Baní
Egypt	Angie Abdalla	19	Alexandria
Finland	Saija Palin	21	Turku
France	Céline Cheuva	23	Lille
Germany	Tania Freuderberg	21	Berlin
Great Britain	Janeth Kehinde Ayuba	19	London
Greece	Penelope Lentzou	23	Athens
Guam	Lourdes Rivera	18	Hagåtña
Guatemala	Gladys Alvarado	20	Chiquimula
Hawaii	Christy Chung	23	Honolulu
Hong Kong	Myolie Wu	19	Hong Kong
Iceland	Ásbjörg Kristinsdóttir	20	Reykjavík
India	Srikrupa Murali	20	Karnataka
Israel	Nofit Shevach	18	Tel Aviv
Japan	Kana Onoda	22	Fukushima
Latvia	Agnese Keiša	22	Riga
Lebanon	Clémence Achkar	19	Beirut
Macedonia	Delfina Zafirova	23	Skopje
Malaysia	Andrea Gomez	21	Sarawak
Malta	Catherine Seisan	19	Valletta
Mexico	Graciela Soto	22	Morelos
Nicaragua	Claudia Alaniz	22	Managua
Northern Mariana Islands	Miyuki Hill	20	Saipan
Norway	Anette Rusten	20	Oslo
Palau	Charlene Kaud Omelau	20	Koror
Panama	Blanca Elena Espinosa	20	Panama City
Philippines	Georgina Sandico	20	Bicol
Poland	Adrianna Gerczew	18	Kuyavia-Pomerania
Portugal	Andreia Antunes	18	Lisbon
Russia	Maria Tchebotkevitch	19	Krasnodar
Senegal	Aïcha Faye	19	Dakar
Singapore	Janice Koh	22	Singapore
Slovakia	Adela Bartková	20	Zemplínska Nová Ves
South Korea	Lee Jae-won	22	Seoul
Spain	Carmen Fernández	21	Seville
Togo	Deborah Tiyéna Bassuka	20	Lomé
Tunisia	Leïla Bent Abdesalem	21	Tunis
Turkey	Merve Alman	18	Istanbul
Ukraine	Liliya Zalunina	19	Kyiv
United States	Jennifer Glover	20	Castro Valley
Uruguay	Daniela Abasolo	22	Montevideo
Venezuela	Andreína Llamozas	19	Caraballeda
