= List of Icelandic films =

The following is a list of notable films produced in Iceland by Icelanders. Star marked films are films in coproduction with Iceland. Although Arne Mattsson is Swedish, his film is included because it is based on a book by the Icelandic Nobel Prize-winning author Halldór Laxness.

== 1900–1979 ==
Year	Original title	English title	Director
1915	Breiðafjarðareyjar	Breiðafjarðareyjar documentary	
1923*	Hadda Padda	Hadda Padda co-production	Gunnar Robert Hansen; Guðmundur Kamban
1923	Ævintýri Jóns og Gvendar	Ævintýri Jóns og Gvendar short film	Loftur Guðmundsson (is)
1925	Ísland í lifandi myndum	Ísland í lifandi myndum documentary	
1926*	Det Sovende hus	Det Sovende hus co-production	Guðmundur Kamban
1944	Lýðveldisstofnunin 1944	Lýðveldisstofnunin 1944 documentary	Óskar Gíslason (is)
1947	Reykjavík vorra daga	Reykjavík vorra daga documentary	
1949	Björgunarafrekið við Látrabjarg	Björgunarafrekið við Látrabjarg documentary	Óskar Gíslason (is)
1949	Milli fjalls og fjöru	Milli fjalls og fjöru	Loftur Guðmundsson (is)
1950	Síðasti bærinn í dalnum	Síðasti bærinn í dalnum	Óskar Gíslason (is)
1951	Niðursetningurinn	Niðursetningurinn	Loftur Guðmundsson (is)
1951	Reykjavíkurævintýri Bakkabræðra	Reykjavíkurævintýri Bakkabræðra	Óskar Gíslason (is)
1954	Fögur er hlíðin	Fögur er hlíðin	
1954	Nýtt hlutverk	Nýtt hlutverk	Óskar Gíslason (is)
1954*	Salka Valka	Salka Valka co-production	Arne Mattsson
1957	Gilitrutt	Gilitrutt	Ásgeir Long
1962	79 af stöðinni	79 af stöðinni	Erik Balling
1962	Hafnarfjörður fyrr og nú	Hafnarfjörður fyrr og nú documentary	Gunnar Róbertsson Hansen
1967	Hernámsárin 1	Hernámsárin 1 documentary	Reynir Oddsson (is)
1967*	Den Røde kappe	Hagbard and Signe	Gabriel Axel
1969	Hernámsárin 2	Hernámsárin 2 documentary	Reynir Oddsson (is)
1972	Brekkukotsannáll	Brekkukotsannáll	Rolf Hädrich
1977	Morðsaga	Morðsaga	Reynir Oddsson (is)

== 1980s ==
Year	Original title	English title	Director
1980	Land og synir	Land og synir	Ágúst Guðmundsson
1980	Veiðiferðin	Veiðiferðin	Andrés Indriðason
1980	Óðal feðranna	Óðal feðranna	Hrafn Gunnlaugsson
1981	Jón Oddur og Jón Bjarni	Jón Oddur og Jón Bjarni	Þráinn Bertelsson
1981	Punktur, punktur, komma, strik	Punktur, punktur, komma, strik	Þorsteinn Jónsson (is)
1981	Útlaginn	Outlaw	Ágúst Guðmundsson
1982	Með allt á hreinu	On Top	Ágúst Guðmundsson
1982	Okkar á milli	Okkar á milli	Hrafn Gunnlaugsson
1982	Rokk í Reykjavík	Rokk í Reykjavík documentary	Friðrik Þór Friðriksson
1982	Sóley	Sóley	Róska
1983	Á hjara veraldar	Rainbows End	Kristín Jóhannesdóttir
1983	Húsið	The House	Egill Eðvarðsson
1983	Nýtt líf	Nýtt líf	Þráinn Bertelsson
1983	Skilaboð til Söndru	Skilaboð til Söndru	Kristín Pálsdóttir
1984	Atómstöðin	Atomic Station	Þorsteinn Jónsson (is)
1984	Dalalíf	Dalalíf	Þráinn Bertelsson
1984	Gullsandur	Golden Sands	Ágúst Guðmundsson
1984	Hrafninn flýgur	When the Raven Flies	Hrafn Gunnlaugsson
1984	Kúrekar norðursins	Kúrekar norðursins documentary	Friðrik Þór Friðriksson
1985	Hringurinn	Hringurinn documentary	Friðrik Þór Friðriksson
1985	Hvítir mávar	Cool Jazz and Coconuts	Jakob F. Magnússon
1985	Löggulíf	Löggulíf	Þráinn Bertelsson
1985	Skammdegi	Deep Winter	Þráinn Bertelsson
1986	Eins og skepnan deyr	Eins og skepnan deyr	Hilmar Oddsson (is)
1986	Stella í orlofi	Stella í orlofi	Þórhildur Þorleifsdóttir
1987	Miðnesheiði	Miðnesheiði documentary	Sigurður Snæberg Jónsson
1987	Skytturnar	White Whales	Friðrik Þór Friðriksson
1988	Foxtrot	Foxtrot (is)	Jón Tryggvason
1988	Í skugga hrafnsins	In the Shadow of the Raven	Hrafn Gunnlaugsson
1989	Kristnihald undir Jökli	Under the Glacier	Guðný Halldórsdóttir
1989	Magnús	Magnús	Þráinn Bertelsson

== 1990s ==
Year	Original title	English title	Director
1990*	The Juniper Tree	The Juniper Tree	Nietzchka Keene
1990	Ævintýri Pappírs Pésa	The Adventures of Paper Peter	Ari Kristinsson (is)
1990	Ryð	Ryð	Lárus Ýmir Óskarsson
1991	Börn náttúrunnar	Children of Nature	Friðrik Þór Friðriksson
1991*	Hvíti víkingurinn	The White Viking	Hrafn Gunnlaugsson
1992	Ingaló	Ingaló	Ásdís Thoroddsen
1992	Karlakórinn Hekla	The Men's Choir	Guðný Halldórsdóttir
1992	Sódóma Reykjavík	Remote Control	Óskar Jónasson
1992	Svo á jörðu sem á himni	As in Heaven	Kristín Jóhannesdóttir
1992	Veggfóður	Wallpaper	Júlíus Kemp
1992	Ævintýri á Norðurslóðum	Ævintýri á Norðurslóðum	Marius Olsen; Katrin Ottarsdóttir; Kristín Pálsdóttir
1993	Hin helgu vé	The Sacred Mound	Hrafn Gunnlaugsson
1993	Stuttur Frakki	Behind Schedule	Gísli Snær Erlingsson
1994	Bíódagar	Movie Days	Friðrik Þór Friðriksson
1994	Skýjahöllin	Sky Palace	Þorsteinn Jónsson (is)
1995	Á köldum klaka	Cold Fever	Friðrik Þór Friðriksson
1995	Agnes	Agnes	Egill Eðvarðsson
1995	Ein stór fjölskylda	One Family	Jóhann Sigmarsson
1995	Einkalíf	Einkalíf	Þráinn Bertelsson
1995	Nei er ekkert svar	No Is No Answer	Jón Tryggvason
1995	Tár úr steini	Tears of Stone	Hilmar Oddsson (is)
1995	Benjamín Dúfa	Benjamin, the Dove	Gísli Snær Erlingsson
1996	Djöflaeyjan	Devil's Island	Friðrik Þór Friðriksson
1996	Draumadísir	Draumadísir	Ásdís Thoroddsen
1997	Blossi/810551	Blossi/810551	Júlíus Kemp
1997	María	Maria	Einar Heimisson
1997	Perlur og svín	Pearls and Swine	Óskar Jónasson
1997	Stikkfrí	Stikkfrí	Ari Kristinsson (is)
1998	Dansinn	The Dance	Ágúst Guðmundsson
1998	Popp í Reykjavík	Popp í Reykjavík documentary	Ágúst Jakobsson
1998	Sporlaust	No Trace	Hilmar Oddsson (is)
1999	(Ó)eðli	(Ó)eðli	Haukur M. Hrafnsson
1999	Fíaskó	Fiasco	Ragnar Bragason
1999	Ungfrúin góða og húsið	The Honour of the House	Guðný Halldórsdóttir

== 2000s ==
Year	Original title	English title	Director
2000	101 Reykjavík	101 Reykjavík	Baltasar Kormákur
2000	Englar alheimsins	Angels of the Universe	Friðrik Þór Friðriksson
2000	Ikíngut	Ikíngut	Gísli Snær Erlingsson
2000	Íslenski draumurinn	The Icelandic Dream	Róbert I. Douglas
2000	Myrkrahöfðinginn	Witchcraft	Hrafn Gunnlaugsson
2000	Óskabörn þjóðarinnar	Óskabörn þjóðarinnar	Jóhann Sigmarsson
2001	Gæsapartí	Gæsapartí	Böðvar Bjarki Pétursson
2001	Lalli Johns	Lalli Johns documentary	Þorfinnur Guðnason
2001	Mávahlátur	The Seagull's Laughter	Ágúst Guðmundsson
2001*	No Such Thing	No Such Thing	Hal Hartley
2001	Málarinn og sálmurinn hans um litinn	Málarinn og sálmurinn hans um litinn documentary	Erlendur Sveinsson
2001	Villiljós	Dramarama	Dagur Kári; Inga Lísa Middleton; Ragnar Bragason; Ásgrímur Sverrisson; Einar Thor
2002	Fálkar	Falcons	Friðrik Þór Friðriksson
2002	Gemsar	Made in Iceland	Mikael Torfason
2002	Hafið	The Sea	Baltasar Kormákur
2002	Í faðmi hafsins	Í faðmi hafsins	Lýður Árnason; Jóakim Reynisson
2002	Í skóm drekans	In the Shoes of the Dragon documentary	Hrönn Sveinsdóttir; Árni Sveinsson
2002	Leitin að Rajeev	Leitin að Rajeev documentary	Birta Fróðadóttir; Rúnar Rúnarsson
2002	Maður eins og ég	A Man Like Me	Róbert I. Douglas
2002	Regína!	Regína!	María Sigurðardóttir
2002	Reykjavík Guesthouse	Reykjavík Guesthouse	Unnur Ösp Stefánsdóttir; Björn Thors
2002	Stella í framboði	Stella í framboði	Guðný Halldórsdóttir
2002	Hlemmur	Hlemmur documentary	Ólafur Sveinsson
2003	Varði goes Europe	Varði goes Europe documentary	Grímur Hákonarson
2003	Didda og dauði kötturinn	Didda og dauði kötturinn	Helgi Sverrisson
2003	Fyrsti Apríl	Fyrsti Apríl	Haukur M. Hrafnsson
2003	Mótmælandi Íslands	Mótmælandi Íslands documentary	Þóra Fjelsted; Jón Karl Helgason
2003	Nói albinói	Noi the Albino	Dagur Kári
2003*	Salt	Salt	Bradley Rust Gray
2003	Ussss	Ussss	Eiríkur Leifsson
2003*	Stormviðri	Stormy Weather	Sólveig Anspach
2003*	Þriðja nafnið	Þriðja nafnið	Einar Þór Gunnlaugsson
2004	Rockville	Rockville documentary	Þorsteinn Jónsson (is)
2004	Blindsker	Blindsker documentary	Ólafur Jóhannesson
2004	Dís	Dís	Silja Hauksdóttir
2004	Í takt við tímann	Ahead of Time	Ágúst Guðmundsson
2004	Kaldaljós	Cold Light	Hilmar Oddsson (is)
2004	Konunglegt bros	Konunglegt bros	
2004	Love Is in the Air	Love Is in the Air documentary	Ragnar Bragason
2004	Niceland	Niceland	Friðrik Þór Friðriksson
2004	Opinberun Hannesar	A Revelation for Hannes	Hrafn Gunnlaugsson
2004	Pönkið og Fræbbblarnir	Pönkið og Fræbbblarnir documentary	Örn Marino Arnarson; Thorkell S. Hardarson
2004*	Silný kafe	Silný kafe	Börkur Gunnarsson
2004*	One Point O	One Point O	Jeff Renfroe; Marteinn Thorsson
2005	Africa United	Africa United semi documentary	Ólafur Jóhannesson
2005	Gargandi snilld	Screaming Masterpiece documentary	Ari Alexander Ergis Magnússon
2005	Strákarnir okkar	Eleven Men Out	Róbert I. Douglas
2005	Knight of the Living Dead	Knight of the Living Dead	Bjarni Gautur
2005*	A Little Trip to Heaven	A Little Trip to Heaven	Baltasar Kormákur
2005*	Voksne mennesker	Dark Horse	Dagur Kári
2005	Beowulf & Grendel	Beowulf & Grendel	Sturla Gunnarsson
2005	Allir litir hafsins eru kaldir	Allir litir hafsins eru kaldir TV movie	Anna Th. Rögnvaldsdóttir
2005	Blóðbönd	Thicker than Water	Árni Ásgeirsson
2005	How Do You Like Iceland?	How Do You Like Iceland? documentary	Kristín Ólafsdóttir
2006	Börn	Children	Ragnar Bragason
2006	Act Normal	Act Normal; Semi documentary	Ólafur Jóhannesson
2006	Mýrin	Jar City	Baltasar Kormákur
2006	Þetta er ekkert mál	Þetta er ekkert mál documentary	Steingrímur Jón Þórðarson
2006*	Direktøren for det hele	The Boss of It All	Lars von Trier
2006	Köld slóð	Cold Trail	Björn Br. Björnsson
2007	Astrópía	Dorks and Damsels	Gunnar B. Gudmundsson
2007	Foreldrar	Parents	Ragnar Bragason
2007	Veðramót	The Quiet Storm	Guðný Halldórsdóttir
2007	Duggholufólkið	No Network	Ari Kristinsson (is)
2007	Queen Raquela	The Amazing Truth About Queen Raquela semi documentary	Ólafur Jóhannesson
2008	Heiðin	Small Mountain	Einar Thor Gunnlaugsson
2008	Stóra planið	The Higher Force	Ólafur Jóhannesson
2008	Reykjavík-Rotterdam	Reykjavík-Rotterdam	Óskar Jónasson
2008	Brúðguminn	White Night Wedding	Baltasar Kormákur
2008	Sveitabrúðkaup	Country Wedding	Valdís Óskarsdóttir
2009	Draumalandið	Dreamland documentary	Þorfinnur Guðnason / Andri Snær Magnason
2009	Jóhannes	Johannes	Þorsteinn Gunnar Bjarnason (is)
2009	Bjarnfreðarson	Bjarnfreðarson	Ragnar Bragason

== 2010s ==
Year	Original title	English title	Director
2010	Mamma Gógó	Mamma Gogo	Friðrik Þór Friðriksson
2010	Órói	Jitters	Baldvin Zophoníasson
2010	Sumarlandið	Summerland	Grímur Hákonarson
2010	Kóngavegur	King's Road	Valdís Óskarsdóttir
2010	Boðberi	Messenger	Hjálmar Einarsson
2010	Algjör Sveppi og dularfulla hótelherbergið	The Secret Spell	Bragi Þór Hinriksson
2010	Brim	Undercurrent	Árni Ólafur Ásgeirsson
2010	Gnarr	Gnarr documentary	Gaukur Úlfarsson
2010	Maybe I should Have	Maybe I Should Have documentary	Gunnar Sigurðsson
2011	Rokland	Stormland	Marteinn Þórsson
2011	Okkar eigin Osló	Our Own Oslo	Reynir Lyngdal
2011	Kurteist fólk	Polite People	Olaf de Fleur Johannesson (as Olaf de Fleur)
2011	Glæpur og samviska	Crime & Guilt	Ásgeir Hvítaskáld
2011	Á annan veg	Either Way	Hafsteinn Gunnar Sigurðsson
2011	Algjör Sveppi og töfraskápurinn	The Magic Wardrobe	Bragi Hinriksson
2011	Hrafnar, Sóleyjar & Myrra	Ravens, Buttercups and Myrrh	Helgi Sverrisson, Eyrún Ósk Jónsdóttir
2011	Eldfjall	Volcano	Rúnar Rúnarsson
2011	Hetjur Valhallar - Þór	Legends of Valhalla - Thor	Óskar Jónasson
2011	Borgríki	City State	Olaf de Fleur Johannesson (as Olaf de Fleur)
2012	Svartur á leik	Black's Game	Óskar Thór Axelsson
2012	Frost	Frost	Reynir Lyngdal
2012	Djúpið	The Deep	Baltasar Kormákur
2013	XL	XL	Marteinn Thorsson
2013	Þetta reddast	Rock Bottom	Börkur Gunnarsson
2013	Ófeigur gengur aftur	Spooks and Spirits	Ágúst Guðmundsson
2013	Falskur fugl	Ferox	Þór Ómar Jónsson
2013	Hross í oss	Of Horses and Men	Benedikt Erlingsson (is)
2013	Málmhaus	Metalhead	Ragnar Bragason
2014	Harry og Heimir: Morð eru til alls fyrst	Harry & Heimir	Bragi Þór Hinriksson
2014	Vonarstræti	Life in a Fishbowl	Baldvin Zophoníasson
2014	Grafir og bein	Graves and Bones	Anton Sigurðsson
2014	Borgríki 2	City State 2	Olaf de Fleur Johannesson (as Olaf de Fleur)
2014	Afinn	The Grandad	Bjarni Thorsson
2014	París Norðursins	Paris of the North	Hafsteinn Gunnar Hafsteinsson
2014	Algjör Sveppi og Gói bjargar málunum	The Biggest Rescue	Bragi Þór Hinriksson
2015	Fúsi	Virgin Mountain	Dagur_Kári
2015	Austur	East of the Mountain	Jón Atli Jónasson
2015	Blóðberg	The Homecoming	Björn Hlynur Haraldsson
2015	Bakk	Reverse	Gunnar Hansson and Davíð Óskar Ólafsson
2015	Hrútar	Rams	Grímur Hákonarson
2015	Albatross	Albatross	Snævar Sölvi Sölvason
2015	Webcam	Webcam	Sigurður Anton Friðþjófsson
2015	Þrestir	Sparrows	Rúnar Rúnarsson
2016	Fyrir framan annað fólk	In Front of Others	Óskar Jónasson
2016	Reykjavík	Reykjavik	Ásgrímur Sverrisson
2016	Eiðurinn	The Oath	Baltasar Kormákur
2016	Grimmd	Cruelty	Anton Sigurðsson
2016	Hjartasteinn	Heartstone	Guðmundur Arnar Guðmundsson
2017	Snjór og Salóme	Snjór og Salóme	Sigurður Anton
2017	Rökkur	Rift	Erlingur Óttar Thoroddsen
2017	Ég man þig	I Remember You	Óskar Thór Axelsson
2017	Undir trénu	Under the Tree	Hafsteinn Gunnar Sigurðsson
2017	Sumarbörn	Summer Children	Guðrún Ragnarsdóttir
2018	Svanurinn	The Swan	Ása Helga Hjörleifsdóttir
2018	Lói - Þú flýgur aldrei einn	Ploey	Árni Ólafur Ásgeirsson
2018	Fullir vasar	Fullir vasar	Anton Sigurðsson
2018	Andið eðlilega	And Breathe Normally	Ísold Uggadóttir
2018	Víti í Vestmannaeyjum	Eruption Aftermath	Bragi Þór Hinriksson
2018	Vargur	Vultures	Börkur Sigthorsson
2018	Lof mér að falla	Let Me Fall	Baldvin Z
2018	Kona fer í stríð	Woman at War	Benedikt Erlingsson (is)
2018	Undir halastjörnu	Mihkel	Ari Alexander Ergis Magnússon
2019	Arctic	Arctic	Joe Penna
2019	Tryggð	The Deposit	Ásthildur Kjartansdóttir
2019	Vesalings elskendur	Pity the Lovers	Maximilian Hult
2019	Eden	Eden	Snævar Sölvi Sölvason
2019	Taka 5	Taka 5	Magnús Jónsson
2019	Héraðið	The County	Grímur Hákonarson
2019	Hvítur, hvítur dagur	A White, White Day	Hlynur Pálmason
2019	Agnes Joy	Agnes Joy	Silja Hauksdóttir
2019	Þorsti	Thirst	Gaukur Úlfarsson
2019	Bergmál	Echo	Rúnar Rúnarsson

== 2020s ==
Year	Original title	English title	Director
2020	Gullregn	The Garden	Ragnar Bragason
2020		Last and First Men	Jóhann Jóhannsson
2021	Dýrið	Lamb	Valdimar Jóhannsson
2021	Leynilögga	Cop Secret	Hannes Þór Halldórsson
2022	Berdreymi	Beautiful Beings	Guðmundur Arnar Guðmundsson
2022	Volaða land	Godland	Hlynur Pálmason
2023	Napóleonsskjölin	Operation Napoleon	Óskar Þór Axelsson

== Films strongly related to Iceland ==
Partial list films strongly related to Iceland while not produced in Iceland by Icelanders:

- Iceland (1942)
- Den brysomme mannen (The Bothersome Man) (2006)
- The Secret Life of Walter Mitty (2013)
- Reykjavik (2014)
- Land Ho (2014)

=== Films (partly) shot in Iceland ===
- Saga Borgarættarinnar (1919) - first film shot in Iceland
- A View to a Kill (1985) - opening scene
- Judge Dredd (1995)
- Independence Day (1996)
- The Fifth Element (1997)
- Lara Croft: Tomb Raider (2001)
- Die Another Day (2002)
- The League of Extraordinary Gentlemen (2003)
- Batman Begins (2005) - scenes on ice shot in Iceland
- Flags of Our Fathers (2006) - war scenes on black beach
- Journey to the Center of the Earth (2008)
- Birdsong (2008)
- Thor: The Dark World (2013)
- Oblivion (2013)
- The Secret Life of Walter Mitty (2013) - also includes Icelandic actors
- Interstellar (2014)
- Rogue One (2016)
- Soudain seuls (2023)
