= Helga Bachmann =

Icelandic actress and director

- Born: 24 July 1931; Reykjavík, Iceland
- Died: 7 January 2011 (aged 79)
- Occupations: Actress; director

Helga Bachmann (24 July 1931 – 7 January 2011) was an Icelandic actress and theatre director.

== Early life and education ==
Helga Bachmann was born in Reykjavík. She graduated in 1948 from the school at Hallormsstaður and trained as an actress at two private drama schools.

== Career ==
She began her career in 1952 with Leikfélag Reykjavíkur ('Reykjavík Theatre Company') and was a permanent member of the company from 1962 to 1976, when she transferred to Þjóðleikhúsið ('National Theatre of Iceland'), where she remained until her retirement in 2000.

In addition to the stage, she appeared in films including the film of Halldór Laxness's Atomstöðin (1984; transl. The Atom Station) and Í skugga hrafnsins) (1988; transl. In the Shadow of the Raven).

She also directed for the stage, among other works Reykjavíkursögur by Ásta Sigurðardóttir.

She was the first director of the Icelandic internet broadcasting service, from 1984 to 1987, and served on the board of Friðarsamtök listamanna ('Actors' Peace Association').

== Honours ==
In 1968, she was the second woman to be awarded the Silfurlampinn (transl. Silver Lamp Award) for the best performance by an actor, for the title role in Henrik Ibsen's Hedda Gabler. In 1984 she was awarded the Knight's Cross of the Order of the Falcon.

== Private life ==
She was married to Helgi Skúlason, also an actor, until his death in 1996. They had two sons and a daughter; she also had a daughter from a previous relationship. Their son, Skúli Helgason has twice been elected as a representative in the Althing.
