= Helgi Skúlason =

Icelandic actor (1933–1996)

- Born: 4 September 1933; Keflavík, Iceland
- Died: 25 September 1996 (aged 63)
- Occupation: Actor
- Spouse: Helga Bachmann

Helgi Skúlason (4 September 1933 – 25 September 1996) was an Icelandic actor and stage director.

== Early life and education ==
Helgi was born in Keflavík and attended the district school at Laugarvatn; he trained as an actor at the National Theatre of Iceland school, finishing in 1954.

== Career ==
He began his career with the National Theatre. In 1959 he joined the Reykjavík Theatre Company, remaining with that company until 1976 as an actor and director and serving terms as its president and on its board, until he rejoined the National Theatre in 1976. He also directed a number of productions for the RÚV Playhouse. In 1972 he co-founded the Icelandic Directors' Association (Félag leikstjóra á Íslandi) and was its first chairman. In 1964 he won the Silver Lamp Award for the best performance by an actor for his role as Franz in an adaptation of Jean-Paul Sartre's The Condemned of Altona.

He later played major roles in the Icelandic films When the Raven Flies (as Þórður) and its sequels In the Shadow of the Raven (for which he and Tinna Gunnlaugsdóttir were nominated for European Film Awards) and The White Viking and the 1987 Norwegian film Pathfinder.

== Private life ==
Helgi was married to Helga Bachmann, also an actor. They had two sons, Hallgrímur Helgi Helgason and Skúli Þór Helgason and a daughter, Helga Vala Helgadóttir, together, and Helgi had a stepdaughter from before his marriage to Helga, named Þórdís Bachmann. Skúli Helgason has twice been elected as a representative in the Althing. Helga Vala Helgadóttir was a member of the Althing.

== Selected filmography ==
- 1984 - When the Raven Flies
- 1987 - Pathfinder
- 1988 - In the Shadow of the Raven
- 1991 - The White Viking
- 1992 - As in Heaven
- 1997 - A Legend to Ride aka 13th Rider / Pony Track (youth series)
