= Odsmal =

Odsmal may refer to:

- Óðsmál research project by Guðrún Kristín Magnúsdóttir
- Ödsmål locality in Sweden
