= List of Icelandic submissions for the Academy Award for Best International Feature Film =

Best International Feature Film submissions from Iceland

Highlights
- Debut: 1980
- Submissions: 47
- Nominations: 1
- Oscar winners: none

Iceland has submitted films for the Academy Award for Best International Feature Film (Note: The category was previously named the Academy Award for Best Foreign Language Film, but this was changed to the Academy Award for Best International Feature Film in April 2019, after the Academy deemed the word "Foreign" to be outdated.) since 1981. The Icelandic nominee is chosen annually in September by the Icelandic Film and Television Academy, which is also responsible for the Edda Awards.

As of 2026, Iceland has been nominated only once, for Children of Nature (1991).

== Submissions ==
The Academy of Motion Picture Arts and Sciences has invited the film industries of various countries to submit their best film for the Academy Award for Best International Feature Film since 1956. The International Feature Film Committee oversees the process and reviews all the submitted films. Following this, they vote via secret ballot to determine the five nominees for the award.

The country's first submitted film was Land and Sons (1980) directed by Ágúst Guðmundsson.

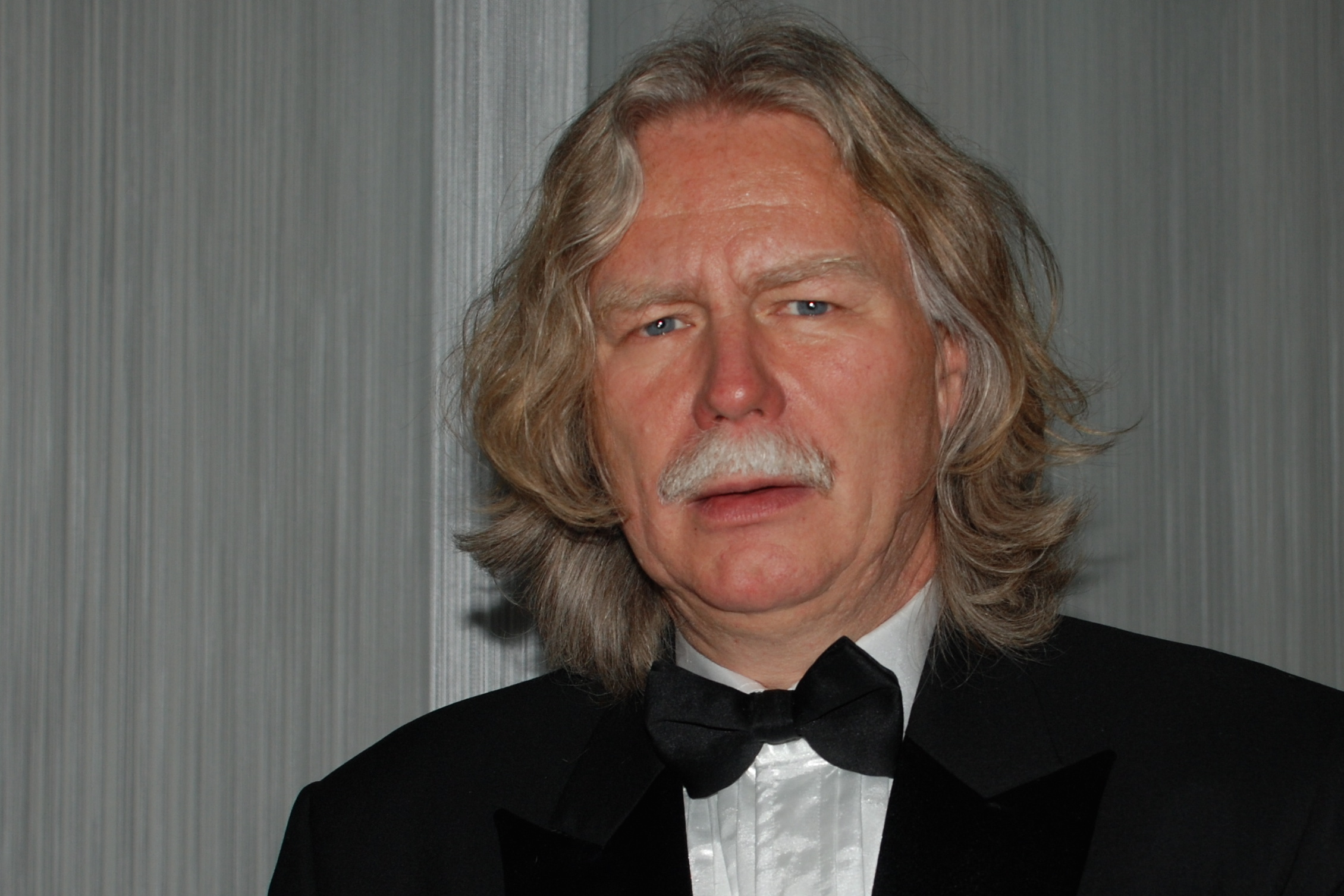
Friðrik Þór Friðriksson directed Iceland's first and only film nominated for the award so far, Children of Nature.

Friðrik Þór Friðriksson's films have been selected to represent Iceland six times, more than any other Icelandic director. Baltasar Kormákur has been selected five times, while Ágúst Guðmundsson and Hrafn Gunnlaugsson have each represented Iceland four times. In 1990, Guðný Halldórsdóttir became the first Icelandic woman to represent the country.

The Deep (2012),Lamb (2021), Godland (2023), and Touch (2024), advanced to the December shortlists, but were not nominated.

All films were primarily in Icelandic. Below is a list of the films that have been submitted by Iceland for review by the Academy for the award by year.

Year (Ceremony)	English title	Icelandic title	Director	Result
1980 (53rd)	Land and Sons	Land og synir	Ágúst Guðmundsson	Not nominated
1981 (54th)	Outlaw: The Saga of Gisli	Útlaginn	Ágúst Guðmundsson	Not nominated
1982 (55th)	Inter Nos	Okkar á milli: Í hita og þunga dagsins	Hrafn Gunnlaugsson	Not nominated
1983 (56th)	The House	Húsið	Egill Eðvarðsson	Not nominated
1984 (57th)	When the Raven Flies	Hrafninn flýgur	Hrafn Gunnlaugsson	Not nominated
1985 (58th)	Deep Winter	Skammdegi	Þráinn Bertelsson	Not nominated
1986 (59th)	The Beast	Eins og skepnan deyr	Hilmar Oddsson	Not nominated
1987 (60th)	White Whales	Skytturnar	Friðrik Þór Friðriksson	Not nominated
1988 (61st)	In the Shadow of the Raven	Í skugga hrafnsins	Hrafn Gunnlaugsson	Not nominated
1989 (62nd)	Under the Glacier	Kristnihald undir jökli	Guðný Halldórsdóttir	Not nominated
1990 (63rd)	The Adventures of Paper Peter	Pappírs Pési	Ari Kristinsson	Not nominated
1991 (64th)	Children of Nature	Börn náttúrunnar	Friðrik Þór Friðriksson	Nominated
1992 (65th)	As in Heaven	Svo á jörðu sem á himni	Kristín Jóhannesdóttir	Not nominated
1993 (66th)	The Sacred Mound	Hin helgu vé	Hrafn Gunnlaugsson	Not nominated
1994 (67th)	Movie Days	Bíódagar	Friðrik Þór Friðriksson	Not nominated
1995 (68th)	Tears of Stone	Tár úr steini	Hilmar Oddsson	Not nominated
1996 (69th)	Devil's Island	Djöflaeyjan	Friðrik Þór Friðriksson	Not nominated
1997 (70th)	Blossi/810551		Júlíus Kemp	Not nominated
1998 (71st)	Count Me Out	Stikkfrí	Ari Kristinsson	Not nominated
1999 (72nd)	The Honour of the House	Ungfrúin góða og húsið	Guðný Halldórsdóttir	Not nominated
2000 (73rd)	Angels of the Universe	Englar alheimsins	Friðrik Þór Friðriksson	Not nominated
2001 (74th)	The Seagull's Laughter	Mávahlátur	Ágúst Guðmundsson	Not nominated
2002 (75th)	The Sea	Hafið	Baltasar Kormákur	Not nominated
2003 (76th)	Noi the Albino	Nói Albínói	Dagur Kari Petursson	Not nominated
2004 (77th)	Cold Light	Kaldaljós	Hilmar Oddsson	Not nominated
2005 (78th)	Ahead of Time	Í takt við tímann	Ágúst Guðmundsson	Not nominated
2006 (79th)	Children	Börn	Ragnar Bragason	Not nominated
2007 (80th)	Jar City	Mýrin	Baltasar Kormákur	Not nominated
2008 (81st)	White Night Wedding	Brúðguminn	Baltasar Kormákur	Not nominated
2009 (82nd)	Reykjavík-Rotterdam		Óskar Jónasson	Not nominated
2010 (83rd)	Mamma Gógó		Friðrik Þór Friðriksson	Not nominated
2011 (84th)	Volcano	Eldfjall	Rúnar Rúnarsson	Not nominated
2012 (85th)	The Deep	Djúpið	Baltasar Kormákur	Made shortlist
2013 (86th)	Of Horses and Men	Hross í oss	Benedikt Erlingsson	Not nominated
2014 (87th)	Life in a Fishbowl	Vonarstræti	Baldvin Zophoníasson	Not nominated
2015 (88th)	Rams	Hrútar	Grímur Hákonarson	Not nominated
2016 (89th)	Sparrows	Þrestir	Rúnar Rúnarsson	Not nominated
2017 (90th)	Under the Tree	Undir trénu	Hafsteinn Gunnar Sigurðsson	Not nominated
2018 (91st)	Woman at War	Kona fer í stríð	Benedikt Erlingsson	Not nominated
2019 (92nd)	A White, White Day	Hvítur, Hvítur Dagur	Hlynur Pálmason	Not nominated
2020 (93rd)	Agnes Joy		Silja Hauksdóttir	Not nominated
2021 (94th)	Lamb	Dýrið	Valdimar Jóhannsson	Made shortlist
2022 (95th)	Beautiful Beings	Berdreymi	Guðmundur Arnar Guðmundsson	Not nominated
2023 (96th)	Godland	Vanskabte land	Hlynur Pálmason	Made shortlist
2024 (97th)	Touch	Snerting	Baltasar Kormákur	Made shortlist
2025 (98th)	The Love That Remains	Ástin Sem Eftir Er	Hlynur Pálmason	Not nominated
2026 (99th)	The Ground Beneath Our Feet	Jörðin undir fótum okkar	Yrsa Roca Fannberg	Pending
