= Silver Lamp Award =

The Silver Lamp (Icelandic: Silfurlampinn) was an award given annually from 1954 to 1973 by the Association of Icelandic Drama Critics (Félag íslenskra leikdómenda), a professional group of writers for the Reykjavík newspapers, for the best performance of the year on the Icelandic stage.

== History ==
Tha award was instituted by the association of drama critics of the Reykjavík newspapers, which numbered half a dozen at the time, upon its foundation in March 1954. The lamp was designed by Leifur Kaldal, a goldsmith, to recall the oil lamps historically used in Icelandic homes. The award was the first acting award and possibly the first cultural award in Iceland.

The recipient was chosen by a vote based on total points for the year's performances, which led to some admired actors never achieving it. Three recipients won it twice: Valur Gíslason, Þorsteinn Ö. Stephensen and Róbert Arnfinnsson. The first woman to win the award was Guðbjörg Þorbjarnardóttir, in 1961. In 1972, as a single exception, instead of an actor the award went to Steinþór Sigurðsson, a photographer.

The 1973 Silver Lamp was to have been awarded to Baldvin Halldórsson for his performance in supporting roles in productions including Cabaret, but he refused it, reading a prepared statement. The chairman of the association, Þorvarður Helgason, the drama critic for Morgunblaðið, announced in response that the award would no longer be given. The 1973 lamp was subsequently sold at auction.

== Award recipients ==
- 1954 - Haraldur Björnsson
- 1955 - Valur Gíslason
- 1956 - Róbert Arnfinnsson
- 1957 - Þorsteinn Ö. Stephensen
- 1958 - Valur Gíslason
- 1959 - Brynjólfur Jóhanesson
- 1960 - no award
- 1961 - Guðbjörg Þorbjarnardóttir
- 1962 - Steindór Hjörleifsson
- 1963 - Gunnar Eyjólfsson
- 1964 - Helgi Skúlason
- 1965 - Gísli Halldórsson
- 1966 - Þorsteinn Ö. Stephensen
- 1967 - Lárus Pálsson
- 1968 - Helga Bachmann
- 1969 - Róbert Arnfinnsson
- 1970 - Rúrik Haraldsson
- 1971 - Sigríður Hagalín
- 1972 - Steinþór Sigurðsson
- 1973 - Baldvin Halldórsson (declined)
