= Gunnar Eyjólfsson =

Icelandic actor (1926–2016)

- Born: 24 February 1926; Keflavík, Kingdom of Iceland
- Died: 21 November 2016 (aged 90)
- Occupation: Actor
- Years active: 1945–2011
- Children: 2

Gunnar Eyjólfsson (24 February 1926 – 21 November 2016) was an Icelandic actor.

Gunnar began his career with the Reykjavík Theatre Company in 1945. In 1961, he joined the National Theatre of Iceland; in 1963 he won the Silver Lamp Award for the best theatrical performance of the year for the title role in Pétur Gautur. He was also the first foreign recipient of the RADA Shakespeare Award.

He also appeared in many films. He won the 2002 Edda Award for Best Leading Actor for his performance as Thórður in The Sea.

In 1999, he was awarded the Knight's Cross of the Order of the Falcon.

== Personal life ==
Gunnar was born in Keflavík. He was the father of Þorgerður Katrín Gunnarsdóttir.

== Selected filmography ==
Year	Title	Role	Notes
1995	The Viking Sagas	Eirik the White	
2000	101 Reykjavík	Nágranni	
2002	The Sea	Thordur	
2005	Beowulf & Grendel	Aeschere	
2010	Mamma Gógó	Gogo's deceased husband	
