= Sigla himinfley =

- Genre: Drama
- Created by: Þráinn Bertelsson
- Written by: Þráinn Bertelsson
- Directed by: Þráinn Bertelsson
- Starring: Gísli Halldórsson; Steinunn Ólína Þorsteinsdóttir; Ingvar E. Sigurðsson; Kristbjörg Kjeld; Rúrik Haraldsson; Margrét Ólafsdóttir; Gunnar Eyjólfsson
- Theme music composer: Sigurður Rúnar Jónsson
- Country of origin: Iceland
- Original language: Icelandic
- No. of episodes: 4

Production
- Producers: Þráinn Bertelsson; Vilhjálmur Ragnarsson
- Cinematography: Jón Karl Helgason
- Editors: Júlíus Kemp; Jón Karl Helgason
- Running time: 215 minutes
- Production company: Nýtt líf

Original release
- Network: Sjónvarpið
- Release: 1996

Sigla himinfley (English: Sail Boats of Heaven) is an Icelandic drama miniseries created by Þráinn Bertelsson. The series takes place in Vestmannaeyjar, Iceland, and follows the lives of an influential family in the fishing industry.
