= Karl Júlíusson =

Icelandic production designer

- Born: Karl Júlíusson; Iceland
- Other names: Kalle Juliusson; Kalli Juliusson; Karl Juliusson; Karl K. Juliusson

Karl Júlíusson (also known as Kalle Juliusson, Kalli Juliusson, Karl K. Juliusson and Karl Juliusson) is an Icelandic-born film production and costume designer who resides in Norway.

Júlíusson got his start in film production in the classic Viking film When the Raven Flies. In the early 80's, Karl Júlíusson ran a leather workshop where he produced and sold custom made leather goods. Director Hrafn Gunnlaugsson had seen a bag made by Júlíusson and visited the shop and convinced him to make costumes for the film. The two ended up making 5 films together. Júlíusson is best known for his production designs for filmmaker Lars Von Trier (Breaking the Waves and Dancer in the Dark) and director Kathryn Bigelow (The Hurt Locker, K-19: The Widowmaker, and The Weight of Water), both of whom he frequently collaborates with.

Júlíusson is the winner of the 2008 Norwegian Amanda award for his art direction on The Kautokeino Rebellion which was directed by Nils Gaup, and which was the most successful domestic film in Norway in 2008.

== Selected filmography ==
=== As production designer ===
- Breaking the Waves (1996) (uncredited)
- Salige er de som tørster (1997) (aka Blessed Are Those Who Thirst)
- When the Light Comes (1998)
- Misery Harbour (1999)
- Dancer in the Dark (2000)
- The Weight of Water (2000) (as Karl Juliusson)
- K-19: The Widowmaker (2002)
- Dogville (2003) (production design & creative consultant)
- The Beautiful Country (2004)
- A Little Trip to Heaven (2005)
- Dear Wendy (2005)
- Gymnaslærer Pedersen (2006) (aka Pedersen: High-School Teacher)
- Kautokeino-opprøret (2008) (aka The Kautokeino Rebellion), (as Karl K. Juliusson)
- The Hurt Locker (2009)
- Antichrist (2009)
- Kon-Tiki (2012)
- The Last King (2016) (aka Birkebeinerne)

=== As costume designer ===
- Hrafninn flýgur (1984) (aka Revenge of the Barbarians)
- Middle Ages Now (1984) (aka Bödeln och Skökan)
- Í skugga hrafnsins (1988) (aka Shadow of the Raven)
- Hvíti víkingurinn (1991) (aka The White Viking)
- The Polar Bear King (1991) (aka Kvitebjørn Kong Valemon)
- Allt gott (1992) (TV) (aka Everything Sweet)
- Hin helgu vé (1993) (aka The Sacred Mound)
