= María Ellingsen =

Icelandic actress (born 1964)

- Born: Maria Ellingsen; Iceland
- Occupation: Actress
- Years active: 1982–present

María Ellingsen is an Icelandic actress. She is known in the United States for her role in the 1992 film The Mighty Ducks 2.

== Career ==
Maria had a contract role on NBC's daytime drama Santa Barbara as Katrina Rukyer from 1991 to 1992.

In 1992 she starred in the American sports comedy The Mighty Ducks 2.

== Other activities ==
Maria is or was a member of a community organisation called Maurathúfan ("The Anthill"), and helped to coordinate a convention held by them was in October 2009, which aimed to "harness the knowledge of the masses and make the conclusions accessible to anyone keen on strengthening Icelandic society".

== Personal life ==
Ellingsen can speak Icelandic, English, German, Danish and Faroese.

== Selected filmography ==
- Inter Nos (1982)
- D2: The Mighty Ducks (1994)
- Agnes (1995)
- Count Me Out (1997)
- Of Horses and Men (2013)
- Touch (2024)
