= Kung Fury 2 =

Upcoming American comedy film by David Sandberg

- Directed by: David Sandberg
- Screenplay by: David Sandberg; Tyler Burton Smith
- Based on: Kung Fury by David Sandberg
- Produced by: Seth Grahame-Smith; David Katzenberg; Minglu Ma; David Sandberg; Aaron Schmidt; Philip Westgren
- Starring: David Sandberg; Michael Fassbender; Arnold Schwarzenegger; Ralf Moeller; Alexandra Shipp; Jorma Taccone; David Hasselhoff
- Cinematography: Tom Stern
- Edited by: Carsten Kurpanek
- Production companies: B-Reel; Laser Unicorns; Argent Pictures; Creasun Entertainment; Hammerstone Studios; Occupant Entertainment; KatzSmith Productions; Nu Boyana Film Studios
- Countries: United States; Sweden
- Language: English
- Budget: $34 million

Kung Fury 2 is an incomplete martial arts comedy film directed by David Sandberg, who also co-wrote the screenplay with Tyler Burton Smith. When it was a viable future release, it was set to be a sequel to the 2015 featurette Kung Fury. Sandberg also returned in the title role, and other stars included Michael Fassbender, Arnold Schwarzenegger, Alexandra Shipp, Ralf Moeller, Jorma Taccone, and David Hasselhoff.

Development of Kung Fury 2 began shortly after the release of the featurette. Fassbender, Schwarzenegger, and Hasselhoff were cast by February 2018, and principal photography took place from July to September 2019. Post-production work stopped in September 2020 due to a lawsuit with investors, and the film's release was indefinitely delayed, with legal issues still ongoing.

== Premise ==
In 1985, Miami is kept safe under the watchful eye of Kung Fury and his Thundercops, the ultimate police force assembled from across history to defeat the villainous Kung Führer, Adolf Hitler. After the tragic death of a Thundercop sees the group disband, a mysterious villain emerges from the shadows to aid in the Führer's quest to attain the ultimate weapon. Kung Fury must travel through space and time to save his friends, defend the prestigious Miami Kung Fu Academy and defeat evil once and for all.

== Cast ==
- David Sandberg as Kung Fury, a Miami detective who possesses a new and powerful form of kung fu after being struck by lightning and bitten by a cobra, thus becoming "The Chosen One" as foretold by an ancient prophecy
- Michael Fassbender as Colt Magnum, Kung Fury's new partner
- Arnold Schwarzenegger as "The President"
- Ralf Moeller as Thor
- Alexandra Shipp as Rey Porter, a reporter with a complicated relationship with Fury
- Jorma Taccone as Adolf Hitler, a.k.a. "Kung Führer"
- Leopold Nilsson as Hackerman, a computer whiz who can transform into a Hackerbot
- Eleni Young as Barbarianna, a Viking warrior who rides a giant wolf and wields a Minigun
- Velimir Velev as Triceracop, a half-man, half-Triceratops cop who is assigned as Kung Fury's partner
- David Hasselhoff as Hoff 9000 (voice), a member of Fury's team who transforms into a car

== Production and delays ==
Sandberg began to develop a feature-length version of his short film alongside Seth Grahame-Smith and David Katzenberg in 2015, shortly after the release of the short film. In February 2018, the project began coming together, with Sandberg directing and starring in the film. Michael Fassbender, David Hasselhoff, Arnold Schwarzenegger and Ralf Moeller were set to star alongside Sandberg, with filming initially set to begin in the summer in the United States and Europe. In May 2018, Eiza González joined the cast, with the film was titled Kung Fury 2. In July 2019, Gonzalez exited the film, with Alexandra Shipp cast to replace her. Filming began on July 29, 2019, in Bulgaria and Germany. On September 25, it was confirmed that filming had wrapped. In September 2020, post-production was halted over a lawsuit with investors. In a 2024 interview, Hammerstone Studios head Alex Lebobvici stated that "the film is complete. We've shot it. There is a matter that we're cautiously optimistic that we're gonna be able to work through. [...] I can't share more than that, but we're hopeful that there will be a resolution shortly." On May 10, 2025, a 10-minute sizzle reel of the film was leaked online.
