= Guðrún Kristín Magnúsdóttir =

Icelandic author and artist (born 1939

Guðrún Kristín Magnúsdóttir (born 27 September 1939) is an Icelandic author and artist.

== Life and career ==
Guðrún Kristín Magnúsdóttir was born on 27 September 1939 in Reykjavík. She has received a number of awards as an artist and author of more than 130 books, including children's books, books on nature, and the Óðsmál series. The Icelandic Ministry of Education, Science, and Culture and Hagthenkir, the Association of Non-fiction and Educational Writers in Iceland, funded the Óðsmál series.

Guðrún received a research grant from the Icelandic Government Cultural Council in 1988. A model in her teens, she appeared in the Icelandic films Hrafninn flýgur (When the Raven Flies) and Myrkrahöfðinginn (Flames of Paradise).

Guðrún graduated from the Commercial College of Iceland in 1962, and graduated from the Icelandic Art Academy (Myndlista-og handíðaskóli Íslands) in 1973. She studied pedagogy at the University of Iceland, and was a distant-education student in the science of consciousness and physics at the Maharishi University of Management. Guðrún studied Sanskrit for several years.

A Heathen Gothi (goði) in Iceland, she grew up in Reykjavík and the Icelandic countryside, where many of her stories were written. Guðrún lives in Iceland, and has spent portions of her life in Scotland and Italy.

== Work ==
=== Ceramics ===
- Icelandic nature volcano souvenir (1984)

=== Scripts ===
- Ég er hættur, farinn, ég er ekki með í svona asnalegu leikriti, staged at the Reykjavík City Theatre in 1990. The script won a competition for the theatre's opening piece.
- Japl, jaml go fuður: a sitcom which was shortlisted in the MEDIA sub-programme of Creative Europe

=== Dramas ===
- Halla, for the Icelandic National Broadcasting Service (RÚV) in 1982
- Ég, hið silfraða sjal for RÚV (1983), and featured in the magazine Vikan in 1981
- Í mjúku myrkri búa draumarnir, for RÚV (1988)

=== Illustrated children's stories ===
- Stories for RÚV's Our Hour
- Hannesar saga Grásteins, a book series published by the Icelandic National Center for Educational Materials in 1999

Guðrún received first and second prize from the Icelandic National Center for Educational Materials for short stories for teenagers in 1992.

=== Books ===
- 1000 stjörnur og fleira ljúft ISBN 9789979895640
- Að leggja Bifröst lag fyrir lag ISBN 9789935467492
- Apakríli, algjör dúlla! ISBN 9789979895084
- Au pair ISBN 9789979895831
- The Bairn of Trolls ISBN 9789935467454
- Baldur Höður Loki: Lesum Óðsmál til að skilja ISBN 9789935467522
- Baldur Höður Loki: What are we celebrating and why? Óðsmál gives intellectual understanding ISBN 9789935467539
- Bína brúða ISBN 9789979895800
- Búi skreytir jólatré ISBN 9789979895923
- Consciousness and Mother Nature: What is Pure Consciousness and what is Mother Nature? ISBN 9789935467508
- Dagdraumar og sorgarband ISBN 9789979895817
- Draumahúsið ISBN 9789979895732
- Drottinn blessi heimilið ISBN 9789979895503
- Dívan skáldsins; -Góða nótt, sagði skáldið, og dó ISBN 9789979895244
- Eru verkir með þessu? Fylgir þessu hiti, mamma? ISBN 9789979895701
- Ég, hið silfraða sjal ISBN 9789979895466
- Fluga ISBN 9789979895022
- The Fly ISBN 9789935467461
- Hagbarður og Hvutti ISBN 9789979895855
- Hagbarður and Hvutti ISBN 9789935467423
- Halla ISBN 9789979895220
- Hnallur og Spói ISBN 9789979895091
- The House of Dreams ISBN 9789935467478
- How to Lay the Bridge Bifröst ISBN 9789935467485
- Hreggnótt ISBN 9789979895053
- Hrekkjusvín og ljósastaurar ISBN 9789979895213
- Hrif ISBN 9789979895329
- Huginn Jöruson, hornungur (sakamál) ISBN 9789979895848
- Hvar voru hrossin í hríðinni? ISBN 9789979895206
- Hver er hann þessi Jakob? ISBN 9789979895978
- In Memoriam – skóflan ISBN 9789979895497
- Í mjúku myrkri búa draumarnir ISBN 9789979895107
- Japl, jaml og fuður ISBN 9789979895114
- Jónki fór í réttirnar ISBN 9789979895572
- Leyniþræðir ISBN 9789979895824
- Melana, drottning frumskógarins ISBN 9789979895602
- Mummi ISBN 9789979895565
- My Bína Doll ISBN 9789935467430
- Óðsmál ISBN 9979601655
- Óðsmál in fornu: efnisyfirlit vefútgáfu ISBN 9789935409409
- Valhallar Óðsmál in gullnu: Handa þróuðum, vísindi, skilningur og djúp þekking forfeðra okkar enduruppgötvuð ISBN 9789935409416
- Óðsmál 2012: Ævi hver til uppljómunar ISBN 9789935409829
- Óðsmál – The Unseen Reality: Science of Consciousness in Heathenry ISBN 9789935409843
- Óðsmál – Norse Edda Spiritual Highlights: We should know why we choose to be born ISBN 9789935467003
- Palli og englabjallan ISBN 9789979895268
- Rakni og Þögn ævintýri, KLUKK leikir barna 1900-2000 ISBN 9789979895725
- Saga Svaðilfara ISBN 9789979895619
- Sál bróðurins, steinbítsbróðurins ISBN 9789979895251
- Soul of a Brother ISBN 9789935467416
- Sigga og hafragrauturinn ISBN 9789979895442
- Skírnismál: helgileikar: handrit handa börnum / a script for bairns: ritual performance ISBN 9789935409836
- Tíkin tóa og grey litli Krúsi ISBN 9789979895336
- Tóta og þau ISBN 9789979895626
- Tröllabarn ISBN 9789979895015
- Vaknaðu, Lóa! Vaknaðu! ISBN 9789979895343
- Vitund og móðir náttúra: Nemum upp ámáttkar fimbulrúnir ISBN 9789935467515
- Who is Jakob? ISBN 9789935467447
- Þetta er mitt hús ISBN 9789979895480

The Hannesar saga Grásteins series:

- Hannesar saga Grásteins, 1. bók: Branda skottlausa, amma Hannesar Grásteins ISBN 9789979895671
- Hannesar saga Grásteins, 2. bók: Branda Bröndudóttir og synir hennar: Hafri og Elri Gúlli ISBN 9789979895695
- Hannesar saga Grásteins, 3. bók: Hafri fer sér að voða, Elra Gúlla leiðist ISBN 9789979895718
- Hannesar saga Grásteins, 4. bók; Hannes Grásteinn og Surtarbrandur ISBN 9789979895749
- Hannesar saga Grásteins, 5. bók: Kettlingunum stolið ISBN 9789979895756
- Hannesar saga Grásteins, 6. bók: Það eina, sem er kátara en kátur kettlingur, er: kátir kettlingar ISBN 9789979895763
- Hannesar saga Grásteins, 7. bók: Hannes Grásteinn hverfur að heiman ISBN 9789979895770
- Hannesar saga Grásteins, 8. bók: Hannes Grásteinn villiköttur á skrifstofu í vesturbænum ISBN 9789979895787
- Hannesar saga Grásteins, 9. bók: Surtarbrandur fer sér að voða ISBN 9789979895794
- Hannesar saga Grásteins, 10. bók: Hannes veiðikló ISBN 9789979895862
- Hannesar saga Grásteins, 11. bók: Hefur kötturinn níu líf? ISBN 9789979895879
- Hannesar saga Grásteins, 12. bók: Hannes flytur í nýtt hverfi ISBN 9789979895886
- Hannesar saga Grásteins, 13. bók: Fleiri viðburðir: börn hvekkja Hannes; Hannes hvekkir stara ISBN 9789979895909
- Hannesar saga Grásteins, 14. bók: Milli ISBN 9789979895916
- Hannesar saga Grásteins, 15. bók: Snjótittlingaveiðar ISBN 9789979895930
- Hannesar saga Grásteins, 16. bók: Nýi kettlingurinn ISBN 9789979895947
- Hannesar saga Grásteins, 17. bók: Vor í lofti ISBN 9789979895954
- Hannesar saga Grásteins, 18. bók: Hannes fer í sveit ISBN 9789979895985
- Hannesar saga Grásteins, 19. bók: Hvolparnir ISBN 9789979895992
- Hannesar saga Grásteins, 20. bók: Dánartilkynning ISBN 9789979708179

Krakka-Óðsmál in fornu, a 2011 40-book series (krakkar means "children" in Icelandic):

- 1 Þór ISBN 9789935409423
- 2 Ægir og Rán ISBN 9789935409430
- 3 Þríeindir ISBN 9789935409447
- 4 Þjóðvitnir, Ullur, Heimdallur ISBN 9789935409454
- 5 Tefla teitir á Iðavöllum unz koma þursamegir III ISBN 9789935409461
- 6 Syn, Glasir, Valhöll, Einherjar ISBN 9789935409478
- 7 Sif, Gefjun ISBN 9789935409485
- 8 Freyr, Skírnir, Gerður ISBN 9789935409492
- 9 Segðu mér, seiðskrati ISBN 9789935409508
- 10 Uppeldi ISBN 9789935409515
- 11 Rígur ISBN 9789935409522
- 12 Jól, þorri, gói ISBN 9789935409539
- 13 Helía, Mímir, valkyrja ISBN 9789935409546
- 14 Svinnur, vín Valföðurs, Gungnir, Glaðheimar ISBN 9789935409553
- 15 Óðinn, synir, hrafnar, eljur, Sleipnir, Valhöll ISBN 9789935409560
- 16 Týr, Fenrir, Drómi, Læðingur, Gleipnir ISBN 9789935409577
- 17 Sól og Nanna ISBN 9789935409584
- 18 Frigg, Sága ISBN 9789935409591
- 19 Fjörgyn, jörð, móðir, árstíðir, Svalinn, Mundilfari ISBN 9789935409607
- 20 Gyðjan mikla, Freyja með Brísingamen ISBN 9789935409614
- 21 Skaði, Njörður, Baldur ISBN 9789935409621
- 22 Geri, Freki, jötnar ISBN 9789935409638
- 23 Jólasveinar, álfar, gandreið ISBN 9789935409645
- 24 Guðin, dagarnir, reikistjörnurnar, mannsheilinn ISBN 9789935409652
- 25 Haftsænir, Gapþrosnir og fleira torskilið – ja bara óskiljanlegt ISBN 9789935409669
- 26 Ginnungagap – höfuðskepnurnar 5 ISBN 9789935409676
- 27 Ginnungagap – nýsta ek niður ISBN 9789935409683
- 28 Þund, heilög vötn hlóa ISBN 9789935409690
- 29 Íslenska, samskrít ISBN 9789935409706
- 30 Huginn, Muninn, Valhöll, einherjar ISBN 9789935409713
- 31 Tært taugakerfi ISBN 9789935409720
- 32 Tröll, jötnar, þursar, vættir, dvergar, þursameyjar, framþróun ISBN 9789935409737
- 33 Urður, Verðandi, Skuld ISBN 9789935409744
- 34 Yfir heiðina með vitkanum ISBN 9789935409751
- 35 Hljóð og efni ISBN 9789935409768
- 36 Hin árborna ámáttka, Grótti, þanþol, meiðmar ISBN 9789935409775
- 37 Vitundarþroskamenntun handa öllum ISBN 9789935409782
- 38 Að heyja frið, stjórnarskrá alheims ISBN 9789935409799
- 39 Matur, melting, hegðan ISBN 9789935409805
- 40 Ósvinnan horfin, Mímir endurheimtur ISBN 9789935409812

Óðsmál for bairns, a 2014 40-book English translation of Krakka-Óðsmál in fornu (bairns is another word for "children"):

- Óðsmál for bairns 1 Þór ISBN 9789935467010
- Óðsmál for bairns 2 Ægir and Rán ISBN 9789935467027
- Óðsmál for bairns 3 trinities ISBN 9789935467034
- Óðsmál for bairns 4 Þjóðvitnir, Ullur, Heimdallur ISBN 9789935467041
- Óðsmál for bairns 5 in Iðavellir - triguna ISBN 9789935467058
- Óðsmál for bairns 6 Syn, Glasir, Valhöll, einherjar ISBN 9789935467065
- Óðsmál for bairns 7 Sif, Easter ISBN 9789935467072
- Óðsmál for bairns 8 Freyr, Skírnir, Gerður - poem Skírnismál ISBN 9789935467089
- Óðsmál for bairns 9 tell me, wizard ISBN 9789935467096
- Óðsmál for bairns 10 upbringing ISBN 9789935467102
- Óðsmál for bairns 11 Rígur (on Edda-poem Rígsþula) ISBN 9789935467119
- Óðsmál for bairns 12 yule, þorri, gói ISBN 9789935467126
- Óðsmál for bairns 13 Hel, Mímir, valkyrja ISBN 9789935467133
- Óðsmál for bairns 14 svinnur, Valföðurs wine, Gungnir, Glaðheimar ISBN 9789935467140
- Óðsmál for bairns 15 Óðinn, sons, Sleipnir, Valhöll ISBN 9789935467157
- Óðsmál for bairns 16 Týr and Fenrir ISBN 9789935467164
- Óðsmál for bairns 17 Sól and Nanna ISBN 9789935467171
- Óðsmál for bairns 18 Frigg, Sága ISBN 9789935467188
- Óðsmál for bairns 19 Fjörgyn, Mother Earth ISBN 9789935467195
- Óðsmál for bairns 20 The Great Goddess ISBN 9789935467201
- Óðsmál for bairns 21 Skaði, Njörður, Baldur ISBN 9789935467218
- Óðsmál for bairns 22 jötnar, Geri, Freki ISBN 9789935467225
- Óðsmál for bairns 23 jólasveinar, elves, gandreið ISBN 9789935467232
- Óðsmál for bairns 24 Gods, days, planets, and more ISBN 9789935467249
- Óðsmál for bairns 25 Haftsænir, Gapþrosnir, Geirölnir, valkyrja ISBN 9789935467256
- Óðsmál for bairns 26 ginnungagap and the 5 elements ISBN 9789935467263
- Óðsmál for bairns 27 ginnungagap - nýsta ek niður ISBN 9789935467270
- Óðsmál for bairns 28 Þund ISBN 9789935467287
- Óðsmál for bairns 29 Sanskrit and Old Norse ISBN 9789935467294
- Óðsmál for bairns 30 Huginn, Muninn, Valhöll, einherjar ISBN 9789935467300
- Óðsmál for bairns 31 pure nervous system ISBN 9789935467317
- Óðsmál for bairns 32 tröll, jötnar, thurse-maidens, wights, dwarfs ISBN 9789935467324
- Óðsmál for bairns 33 Urður, Verðandi, Skuld ISBN 9789935467331
- Óðsmál for bairns 34 guided bird's eye view ISBN 9789935467348
- Óðsmál for bairns 35 sound and "matter" ISBN 9789935467355
- Óðsmál for bairns 36 mighty old Nature ISBN 9789935467362
- Óðsmál for bairns 37 consciousness-based education ISBN 9789935467379
- Óðsmál for bairns 38 waging peace ISBN 9789935467386
- Óðsmál for bairns 39 food, digestion, behaviour ISBN 9789935467393
- Óðsmál for bairns 40 ignorance gone, Mímir regained ISBN 9789935467409
