= Cool Jazz and Coconuts =

1985 film

- Directed by: Jakob Frímann Magnússon
- Written by: Jakob Frímann Magnússon
- Starring: Ragnhildur Gísladóttir
- Release date: 16 March 1985
- Running time: 90 minutes
- Country: Iceland
- Language: Icelandic

Cool Jazz and Coconuts (Icelandic: Kókóstré og Hvítir Mávar) is a 1985 Icelandic drama film directed by Jakob Frímann Magnússon. It was entered into the 14th Moscow International Film Festival.

== Cast ==
- Ragnhildur Gísladóttir as Svala
- Egill Ólafsson as Oddur
- Tinna Gunnlaugsdóttir as Helga
- Þórhallur Sigurðsson as Karl
- Rúrik Haraldsson as Björn - sýslumaður
- Tyrone Nicholas Troupe III as General Reeves
- Jón Tryggvason as Dr. W. Vísindamaður
- Júlíus Agnarsson as Gunnar - Þórðarson
- Flosi Ólafsson as Bjarki - Tryggvason
- Herdís Þorvaldsdóttir as Skólastýra
- Sigurveig Jónsdóttir as Lovísa Símamær
