= Sune Mangs =

Swedish actor

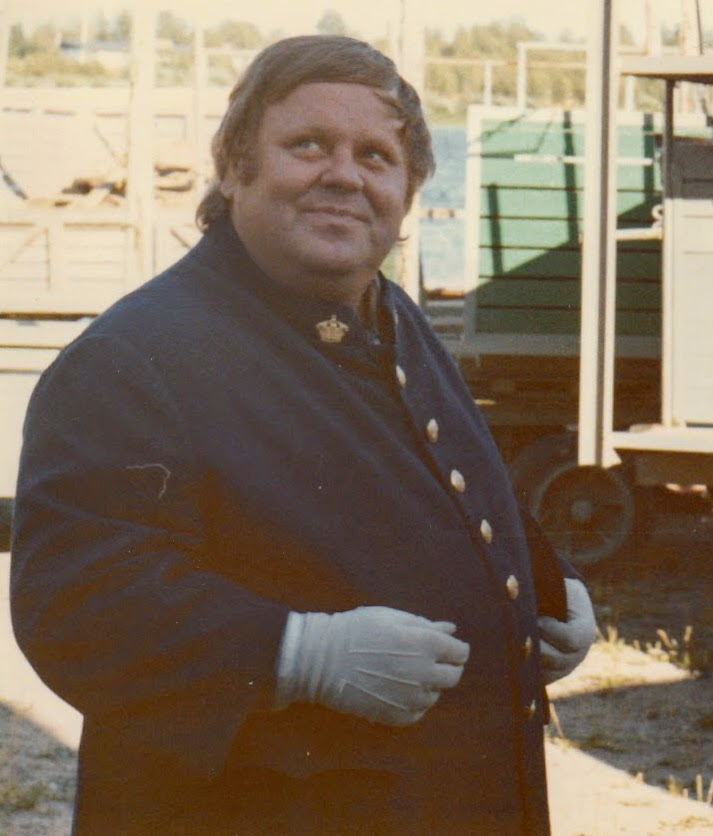
- Sune Mangs in 1970
- Born: Bengt Sune Mangs; 31 December 1932; Kaskinen, Finland
- Died: 11 February 1994 (aged 61); Stockholm, Sweden
- Occupation: Actor
- Years active: 1953–1990

Bengt Sune Mangs (31 December 1932 – 11 February 1994) was a Swedish actor. He appeared in more than 35 films and television shows between 1953 and 1990. Born in Finland, Mangs' parents divorced in the midst of the Winter War, and eight-year-old Mangs moved to Stockholm with his mother and siblings.

== Partial filmography ==
- Speed Fever (1953) - Pupil
- Blockerat spår (1955) - Heikki, Benkan's Friend
- Den tappre soldaten Jönsson (1956) - Soldier
- The Koster Waltz (1958) - Fotograf (uncredited)
- The Jazz Boy (1958) - Jerka, swingpjatt på Milles café
- Laila (1958) - Speaker at the reindeer race
- Fröken Chic (1959) - Distrainer (uncredited)
- Heaven and Pancake (1959) - Torbjörn Lindelöf (uncredited)
- Sängkammartjuven (1959) - Journalist (uncredited)
- Love Mates (1961) - Bojström, bank clerk (uncredited)
- Svenska Floyd (1961) - Sculptor
- Lovely Is the Summer Night (1961) - Jailer (uncredited)
- Lita på mej älskling (1961) - Photographer (uncredited)
- Prins hatt under jorden (1963) - Man at party
- Äktenskapsbrottaren (1964) - Herr Paavo
- Calle P. (1965) - Behrman
- 30 pinnar muck (1966) - Junk Salesman
- Bamse (1968) - Drunk (uncredited)
- Hur Marie träffade Fredrik (1969) - Uncle Urban
- Åsa-Nisse i rekordform (1969) - Finnish man (uncredited)
- Som hon bäddar får han ligga (1970) - Caretaker
- I död mans spår (1975) - Bartender
- The Adventures of Picasso (1978) - Churchill
- Barnförbjudet (1979) - The man with the sausages
- Sverige åt svenskarna (1980) - French minstrel
- Göta kanal eller Vem drog ur proppen? (1981) - Serviceman
- Fanny and Alexander (1982) - Mr. Salenius (Actor) - Teatern
- Spökligan (1987) - Olle
- In the Shadow of the Raven (1988) - Bishop
