= Tinna Gunnlaugsdóttir =

Icelandic actress (born 1954)

- Born: 18 June 1954 (age 71); Iceland
- Occupation: Actress
- Years active: 1981–present

Tinna Gunnlaugsdóttir (born 18 June 1954) is an Icelandic actress. She has appeared in twelve films since 1981. She starred in As in Heaven, which was screened out of competition at the 1992 Cannes Film Festival. She is the sister of director Hrafn Gunnlaugsson. Her husband is the singer, actor and composer Egill Ólafsson. She was the Artistic Director of the National Theatre of Iceland from 2005 to 2015.

== Selected filmography ==
- The Outlaw (1981)
- The Atomic Station (1984)
- Cool Jazz and Coconuts (1985)
- In the Shadow of the Raven (1988)
- As in Heaven (1992)
- The Honour of the House (1999)
