= The Sacred Mound =

1993 film

- Directed by: Hrafn Gunnlaugsson
- Written by: Hrafn Gunnlaugsson
- Starring: Steinþór Rafn Matthíasson
- Release date: 29 October 1993
- Running time: 84 minutes
- Country: Iceland
- Language: Icelandic

The Sacred Mound (Icelandic: Hin helgu vé) is a 1993 Icelandic drama film directed by Hrafn Gunnlaugsson. The film was selected as the Icelandic entry for the Best Foreign Language Film at the 66th Academy Awards, but was not accepted as a nominee.

== Cast ==
- Steinþór Rafn Matthíasson as Gestur
- Alda Sigurðardóttir as Helga
- Helgi Skúlason as Helga's Father
- Tinna Finnbogadóttir as Kolla
- Valdimar Örn Flygenring as Hjalmtyr
- Agneta Prytz as Gestur's Grandmother
- Edda Björgvinsdóttir as Gestur's Mother

== See also ==
- List of submissions to the 66th Academy Awards for Best Foreign Language Film
- List of Icelandic submissions for the Academy Award for Best Foreign Language Film
