= The White Viking =

1991 film by Hrafn Gunnlaugsson

Hvíti Víkingurinn
- Directed by: Hrafn Gunnlaugsson
- Written by: Hrafn Gunnlaugsson
- Produced by: Christer Abrahamsen
- Starring: Gotti Sigurdarson; Maria Bonnevie; Tomas Norström; Egill Ólafsson; Helgi Skúlason; Þorsteinn Hannesson
- Edited by: Hrafn Gunnlaugsson
- Release date: 1991
- Running time: 123 minutes (Theatrical cut)
- Country: Iceland
- Languages: Icelandic, German
- Budget: ISK200,000,000

The White Viking (alternative title Embla, Icelandic: Hvíti víkingurinn, Norwegian: Den hvite viking) is a 1991 film set in Norway and Iceland during the reign of Olaf I of Norway. The film loosely follows actual events.

Embla is the director's cut of The White Viking and was released on DVD in 2007. It premiered at the Reykjavik International Film Festival on October 6, 2007. Embla is the third film of the Raven Trilogy (also known as the Viking Trilogy) consisting of three 'Viking' films:

- When the Raven Flies (1984) - (original Icelandic title: Hrafninn flýgur) - usually known as simply The Raven or Revenge of the Barbarians.
- In The Shadow of the Raven (1987) - (original Icelandic title: Í skugga hrafnsins).
- Embla (2007) - (original Icelandic title: Hvíti víkingurinn) - the directors cut of The White Viking.

Embla was Maria Bonnevie's first screen role when she was sixteen years of age. The choice of names for the young married couple comes from Nordic mythology, in which the first two humans are named Ask and Embla.

== Plot ==
King Olav is a fanatical Christian who seeks to root out paganism in Norway. He hears the voice of Jesus, or White Christ, when praying which causes jealousy in his religious adviser, bishop Thangbrandur. The pagan jarl Godbrandur is the last major resistance to him. Godbrandur's daughter Embla marries Askur, the bastard of powerful lawspeaker Thorgeir of Iceland, and Godbrandur's foster son. King Olav and his men ambush the pagan ceremony. One of Olav's soldiers, Kolbeinn, crushes Godbrandur's wooden statue of Odin, but is axed to death by Embla. Askur and Embla fight the Christians but are captured. Desperately Godbrandur agrees to be baptised to save Askur and Embla. Askur is ordered to christen the remaining pagans on Iceland, since the king thinks a son of Iceland has better hopes than any man of the king. Meanwhile, Embla is kept in a convent as a hostage.

In Iceland, the tricks of conversion Thangbrandur taught Askur proves useless and Thangbrandur turns out to be something of a local joke among the pagans. Askur's half-brother Gunnar is alerted by Askur's presence, since he believes that Askur has come to usurp him. Gunnar and his insane mother Hallbera set up Askur and murder the smith Völondur, blaming it on Askur. Askur is gagged and presented to Thorgeir, unable to identify himself. Völondur's brother Hrappur and Gunnar want Askur to be killed, but due to Askur being a missionary, Thorgeir thinks a martyr's death is what Askur wants. Instead he exiles him back to Norway, like he had previously done with Thangbrandur.

Returning to Norway, Askur attempts to free Embla from the convent. He poses as Jesus to frighten the nuns and he and Embla swim away from the convent. However, they are captured on the shore by king Olav. Embla convinces Olav to allow Askur to go back to Iceland and complete his task. Embla tells Askur that Olav wants to marry her and gives Askur a necklace with an image of Freyja for protection. Olav has captured the sons of the Icelandic chiefs active in Norway. Askur is sent back with Thangbrandur and the jewelry of the sons as proof of the hostages. When Askur returns, Thorgeir goes to fight him on the beach. Askur reveals his identity to Thorgeir, who then stages a faux-duel with him. Thorgeir leads the fight into a pagan temple, where Askur is drenched in sacrificial blood, tricking everyone into thinking that he has been killed. Askur's companions flee with the necklace. Embla escapes the king and hides with sympathetic farmers. Thorgeir hides Askur in a mound while he goes to the Althing. Thorgeir solves to conflict peacefully by converting to Christianity and making a decree that Iceland will be Christian, but the pagans will be allowed to worship in secrecy. This is accepted by Christians and pagans alike. Thangbrandur and Gunnar realise Thorgeir's ploy and try to kill Askur to get the jewelry. Askur outsmarts them, but Thangbrandur is mortally wounded in the struggle. Thangbrandur asks Askur to forgive him, but Askur replies that only White Christ can do that. Thangbrandur admits that White Christ will never do that because of all his done and in a surprise twist Thangbrandur starts to pray to Odin to be allowed entrance into Valhalla.

In Norway, Godbrandur has finished a stavechurch to vindicate Olav. Embla reunites with her father and they plan to escape to Iceland to continue their pagan ways. But before they can leave, Olav's ships appear in Godbrandur's fjord. Realising there is no escape and having received the necklace as a token of Askur's "death", Embla enters the church and sets it on fire in a suicide attempt. Olav and Godbrandur attempt to save Embla. Godbrandur is killed by burning debris, but Olav manages to save Embla and carries her away. Embla attempts to kill him, but the king overpowers her with ease. Olav gives up on making Embla his wife and leaves her be. Embla emerges in the ruins of the church and prepares to commit suicide, but is stopped when she sees what appears to be an apparition of her father, calling out to Odin. Moments later Embla sees a ship carrying Askur appearing in the fjord.

== Cast ==
- Gotti Sigurdarson as Askur
- Maria Bonnevie as Embla
- Egill Ólafsson as Olaf I of Norway
- Tomas Norström as Bishop Þangbrandr
- Þorsteinn Hannesson as Jarl Godbrandur
- Helgi Skúlason as Thorgeir Ljosvetningagodi
- Jón Tryggvason as Ketill
- Gunnar Jónsson as Gunnar
- Bríet Héðinsdóttir as Hallbera
- Maria Sigurdardóttir as Abbessa Stella
- Þráinn Karlsson as Killer-Hrappur
- Sveinn M. Eiðsson as Völondur
- Flosi Ólafsson as Runolfur
- Johannes Brost as Kolbeinn
- Valgardur Egilsson as Olaf the Peacock

== Versions ==
There are three different versions of the film: a five-hour mini-series, the theatrical cut, and the director's cut, Embla.

The director's cut changes the order in which the scenes appear and focuses on the character of Embla. Askur's adventures in Iceland and all Icelandic characters are cut out, save some shots of Askur trekking the Icelandic wilderness. Several scenes featuring Embla and a plotline about Embla birthing Askur's son have been reinserted. Most of these scenes were included in the mini-series. The mini-series and Embla clarify that the character of Gudbrandur likely suffers from a mental disorder which he has passed on to his daughter Embla. This explains their visions, much like king Olaf.

The television series also features additional plotlines about Askur's previous life as a Viking and his descent from Egill Skallagrímsson. The mini-series also includes scenes of sacrificing real animals in pagan rituals. The first episode features the on-screen killing of a pig as a sacrifice to the god Freyr. The last episode features a real butchered calf which has been sacrificed to Odin.

The theatrical cut has released on VHS, while the mini-series and Embla are available on DVD released in 2012.
