= Touch (2024 film) =

- Icelandic theatrical release poster
- Directed by: Baltasar Kormákur
- Screenplay by: Baltasar Kormákur; Ólafur Jóhann Ólafsson
- Based on: Touch by Ólafur Jóhann Ólafsson
- Produced by: Baltasar Kormákur; Agnes Johansen; Mike Goodridge
- Starring: Egill Ólafsson; Kōki; Palmi Kormakur
- Cinematography: Bergsteinn Björgúlfsson
- Edited by: Sigurður Eyþórsson
- Music by: Högni Egilsson
- Production companies: RVK Studios; Good Chaos
- Distributed by: Focus Features (United States); Universal Pictures (International)
- Release date: May 29, 2024 (Iceland)
- Running time: 121 minutes
- Countries: Iceland; United Kingdom; Japan
- Languages: English; Japanese; Icelandic
- Box office: $2,750,436

Touch (Icelandic: Snerting) is a 2024 romantic drama film directed by Baltasar Kormákur, written by Baltasar (Note: Icelandic names do not have family names, and so the final element of the name of Baltasar Kormákur Baltasarsson is a patronymic, not a surname, while the first two elements are his given names. Some English language articles refer to the director as "Kormákur".) and Ólafur Jóhann Ólafsson, and starring Egill Ólafsson, Kōki, and Palmi Kormakur. The film is based on Ólafur's (Note: This person has no surname, and should be referred to by his given name, Ólafur.) 2022 novel of the same name. It is an international co-production between Iceland, United States, and United Kingdom.

Touch was released in Iceland on 29 May 2024. It was chosen as the Icelandic entry for the Best International Feature Film at the 97th Academy Awards, and made the top 15 shortlist, but was ultimately not nominated.

== Plot ==
In the late 1960s, Kristófer is a young Icelandic man studying at the London School of Economics, but his left-wing beliefs put him at odds with the school administration. After being mocked by his college friends for saying he would drop out, Kristófer impulsively applies to be a dishwasher at Nippon, a Japanese restaurant owned by chef Takahashi, where he meets and falls in love with Miko, Takahashi's daughter.

Kristófer learns Japanese and works hard at Nippon, earning the trust of Takahashi and Miko. He witnesses Takahashi forcibly break up a relationship between Miko and her boyfriend. Takahashi trains Kristófer as a chef and lets him come in early to practice. As Miko visits Kristófer to taste his cooking, they grow closer and start a relationship, unbeknownst to Takahashi. Miko confides in Kristófer that her family was originally from Hiroshima, and her mother was pregnant with her at the time of the bombing. Facing discrimination back home as 'Hibakusha', they moved to England.

Upon coming back from a holiday, Kristófer is shocked to see that the restaurant has been closed, and the Takahashis have moved away without saying a word, except for one final paycheck addressed to him.

Fifty years later, Kristófer is now a widower living alone in Iceland. His memory is failing, and his doctor suggests that he should resolve any unfinished business while he still has time and capacity. Kristófer closes his restaurant and sets out to find Miko just when the world is in the grip of the COVID-19 pandemic. Arriving in London in the midst of pandemic restrictions, Kristófer finds Takahashi's restaurant is now a tattoo parlour. He manages to locate Hitomi, a former employee at Nippon, who tells him that Takahashi and Miko moved back to Japan 50 years ago, and Takahashi has since died. She gives Kristófer Miko's last known address.

Kristófer visits Miko's apartment in Japan. After a moment of hesitation, the two embrace, not having seen each other for over half a century. Miko reveals the reason for her sudden departure: her father always feared that her children would have birth defects from radiation exposure, so he forbade her from having relationships altogether. When he discovered Miko was pregnant with Kristófer's child, he moved her back to Japan, and later forced her to give the child up for adoption. Miko has remained unmarried since, with no other children.

Miko then tells Kristófer that their son, Akira, was born a healthy child and happily adopted, and is now a chef with his own restaurant and family. She takes him to Akira's restaurant, where she is a regular customer. Kristófer is overcome with emotion upon seeing his son for the first time, though Akira remains unaware of his biological parents.

The film ends with Kristófer and Miko walking down the street hand in hand. As the screen fades to black, he softly sings to her the Icelandic song he had sung years before at a party at Nippon.

== Cast ==
- Egill Ólafsson as Kristófer
- Kōki as Young Miko
- Palmi Kormakur as Young Kristófer
- Masahiro Motoki as Takahashi-san
- Sigurdur Ingvarsson as Jónas
- Yoko Narahashi as Miko
- Masatoshi Nakamura as Kutaragi-san
- Meg Kubota as Hitomi
- María Ellingsen as Inga
- Eiji Mihara as Dr. Kobayashi
- Theódór Júlíusson
- Starkadur Petursson as Markús
- Ruth Sheen as Mrs. Ellis
- Benedikt Erlingsson as Dr. Stefánsson
- Tatsuya Tagawa as Arai-San
- Charles Nishikawa as Goto-San
- Eugene Nomura as Akira
- Rie Shibata as Hashimoto-san

== Production ==
Touch was produced by RVK Studios. Baltasar, Agnes Johansen, and Mike Goodridge were the film's producers.

In a December 2022 interview, Baltasar Kormákur revealed that he planned to shoot the film in Iceland and Japan.

Principal photography began on October 9, 2022, in London.

== Release ==
Touch was released in Iceland on 29 May 2024. The film had a limited theatrical release in the United States and Canada on 12 July 2024.

== Reception ==
On the review aggregator website Rotten Tomatoes, 92% of 63 critics' reviews are positive, with an average rating of 7.6/10. The website's consensus reads: "Tracing through the passage of time with a light touch, director Baltasar Kormákur's moving drama is a wistful reverie on life itself." Metacritic, which uses a weighted average, assigned the film a score of 74 out of 100, based on 21 critics, indicating "generally favorable" reviews.

In January 2025, it won the Audience award at Tromsø International Film Festival in Norway.

== See also ==
- List of submissions to the 97th Academy Awards for Best International Feature Film
- List of Icelandic submissions for the Academy Award for Best International Feature Film
