= Ralf Moeller =

German actor and former competitive bodybuilder

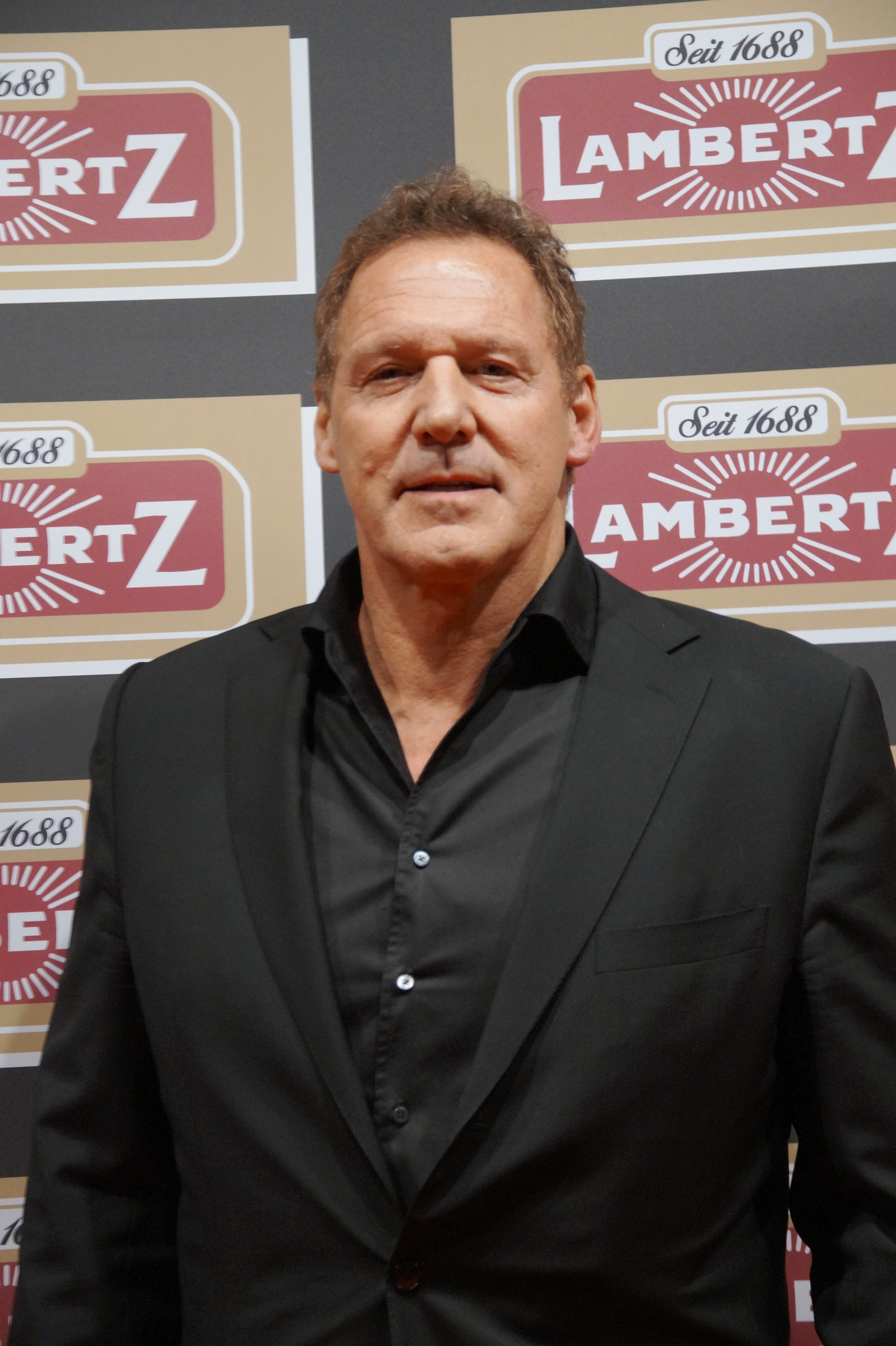
- Moeller in 2016
- Born: Ralf Rudolf Möller; 12 January 1959 (age 67); Recklinghausen, West Germany
- Occupations: Actor, bodybuilder
- Years active: Bodybuilding (1976–1991); Acting (1988–present)
- Website: www.ralfmoeller.com

Ralf Rudolf Moeller (born Möller; German: [ˈmœlɐ]; 12 January 1959) is a German actor and former competitive bodybuilder. He is known for his roles of Brick Bardo in Cyborg, Kjartan in The Viking Sagas, the title character in the television show Conan the Adventurer, Hagen in Gladiator, Thorak in The Scorpion King, and Ulfar in Pathfinder.

== Career ==
Moeller began bodybuilding at age 17 and was the German national champion by 1984. He is one of the tallest bodybuilding champions to date, standing at 1.98 m (6 ft 6 in) and weighing 133,81 kilos (295 lbs) in 1988. He won the heavyweight class of the 1986 IFBB World Championships, and is still the tallest competitor ever in the Mr. Olympia (he finished last in 1988).

He entered his movie career in 1989 with the film Cyborg. In 1992, he appeared in Universal Soldier with Dolph Lundgren and Jean-Claude Van Damme. In 1993, he played the villain Brakus opposite Phillip Rhee and Eric Roberts in Best of the Best 2.

His two biggest mainstream film roles to date are Ridley Scott's Gladiator, and 2002's The Scorpion King. Besides these two movies, he has played the leading character in The Viking Sagas, and Conan the Barbarian in the TV series Conan. The show aired in 1997–1998 with the premise that Conan, and his three sidekicks, were chosen by the god Crom to fight and vanquish the evil Hissah Zul and become king.

In The Viking Sagas (1996), The Bad Pack (1997), and Gladiator (2000), Moeller appeared alongside fellow bodybuilder Sven-Ole Thorsen.

In 2003, he had a cameo appearance in the music video of "Maria (I Like it Loud)", by Scooter, a German techno music band.

Moeller went on to appear in El padrino (2004), sequel to The Bad Pack, once again playing Special Agent Kurt Mayers. He played Hammacher in the 2006 film Beerfest.

In August 2025 he appeared in a DIY campaign with Arnold Schwarzenegger.

== Filmography ==
=== Film and television ===
Year	Title	Role	Language	Notes
1988	Tatort	Unknown	German	TV series: 1 episode
1989	Cyborg	Brick Bardo	English	as Rolf Muller
1990	Occhio alla perestrojka	Serghjei	Italian	as Ralf Rudolf Möller
1992	Universal Soldier	GR74	English	as Ralph Moeller
1993	Best of the Best 2	Gustave Brakus	English	
1994	Der unbekannte Deserteur	Soldier	German	Short
1995	The Viking Sagas	Kjartan	English	
1997	Batman & Robin	Arkham Asylum Guard #2	English	
1997	The Bad Pack	Kurt Mayer	English	
1997-1998	Conan the Adventurer	Conan the Barbarian	English	TV series: 22 episodes
1998	Der Clown	Autobahnpolizist	German	TV
2000	Gladiator	Hagen	English	
2000	Der Superbulle und die Halbstarken	Mark Kerner	German	TV film
2001	Andromeda	Jeger	English	TV series: 1 episode
2001	Sommer und Bolten: Gute Ärzte, keine Engel	Martin Ranklebe	German	TV series: 1 episode
2001	Queen of Swords	Roman Petrov	English	TV series: 1 episode
2001	Relic Hunter	Frank Kafka	English	TV series: 1 episode
2002	Mutant X	Lieutenant Bo Longstreet	English	TV series: 1 episode
2002	The Scorpion King	Thorak	English	
2003	The Paradise Virus	Joseph	English	TV film
2003	Held der Gladiatoren	Ferox	German	TV film
2004	El Padrino	Special Agent Kurt Meyers	English	
2004	Hai-Alarm auf Mallorca	Sven Hansen	German	TV film
2004	Dark Kingdom: The Dragon King	King Thorkilt	English	TV film
2005	My Suicidal Sweetheart	Bruno	English	
2006	Scooter: Excess All Areas	Maria, Disco Dancer	English	Direct-to-video film
2006	Beerfest	Hammacher	English	
2006	Ozzie	'Tank' Emerson	English	
2007	Pathfinder	Ulfar	English	
2007	Seed	Warden Arnold Calgrove	English	
2007	Postal	Officer John	English	
2008	Alone in the Dark II	Boyle	English	Direct-to-video film
2008	Far Cry	Max Cardinal	English	
2008	Time of the Comet	Freiherr Von Keittel	Albanian	
2009	Dejection	Superstitious Boss	English	Short film
2010	Tales of an Ancient Empire	General Hafez	English	
2010	Küstenwache	William Forges	German	TV series: 1 episode
2010	The Tourist	Jail Bird Lunt	English	
2012	Slave	Frank	German	
2012	Alarm für Cobra 11 – Die Autobahnpolizei	Andri Vladic	German	TV series: 1 episode
2014	Sabotage	Unknown	English	
2019	Der letzte Bulle	Ralle	German	TV film of the series
2020	Breach	Vyrl	English	
TBA	Kung Fury 2	Thor	English	
	Ridley Jones: The Movie			
