= Sveinn Einarsson =

Icelandic theatre director (born 1934)

Sveinn Einarsson (born 18 September 1934) is most known for championing and cultivating professional theatre in Iceland. He was the stage director of more than 70 productions, operas, classics and modern plays, including several world premieres in Iceland and other countries.

== Career ==
Sveinn was artistic director of The Reykjavík Theatre Company (RTC) from 1963 to 1972 and director of the National Theatre of Iceland (Icelandic: Þjóðleikhúsið) from 1972 to 1983. He also served as counsellor for the Ministry of Culture of Iceland from 1983 to 1989 and program head at Icelandic television from 1989 to 1993. He was artistic director of the Reykjavík Arts Festival in 1998–2000. He has been chairman and a board member for national and international cultural commissions, committees or institutions. Among these positions are president of the Icelandic Theatre Union (1973–89), chairman of the Icelandic Dramatists' Union (1985–89), vice president of the International Theatre Institute (ITI) (1979–1981, board 1977–79) and president of the Icelandic National Commission for UNESCO since 1994.
