= Flosi Ólafsson =

Icelandic actor

- Born: 27 October 1929; Reykjavík, Iceland
- Died: 24 October 2009 (aged 79); Reykjavík, Iceland
- Occupation: Actor
- Years active: 1962-2009

Flosi Ólafsson (27 October 1929 – 24 October 2009) was an Icelandic actor. He appeared in more than twelve films from 1962 to 2011.

== Selected filmography ==
Year	Title	Role	Notes
1984	When the Raven Flies	Erik	
1985	Cool Jazz and Coconuts	Bjarki - Tryggvason	
1988	In the Shadow of the Raven	Eirikur	
1994	Cold Fever	Hotel owner	
