= The Viking Sagas =

- DVD cover
- Directed by: Michael Chapman
- Written by: Dale Herd; Michael Chapman; Paul R. Gurian
- Produced by: Paul R. Gurian; Tim Van Rellim; Snorri Þórisson
- Starring: Ralf Möller; Sven-Ole Thorsen; Ingibjörg Stefánsdóttir; Hinrik Ólafsson; Þórir Waagfjörð; Hans Martin Stier
- Cinematography: Dean Lent
- Edited by: Larry Jordan
- Music by: George S. Clinton
- Release date: 1995
- Running time: 83 minutes (uncut)
- Countries: United States; Iceland
- Language: English

The Viking Sagas is a 1995 American action drama film, directed by Michael Chapman and starring Ralf Möller and Sven-Ole Thorsen. It is heavily inspired by the Njáls saga, through it features an original plot. It was largely shot on Iceland with a mostly Icelandic cast.

== Plot ==
The story takes place in Iceland around the height of the Viking Age, where a young man, Kjartan (Ralf Möller), must defeat a horde of evil Vikings, intent on taking over his father's land and stealing his girlfriend Gudrun (Ingibjörg Stefánsdóttir) from him too. To help him in this task, Kjartan seeks help from the older Viking Warrior Gunnar (Sven-Ole Thorsen), who trains him to become a fierce fighter, and later aids him in his quest against his archenemy Ketil (Hinrik Ólafsson).

== Cast ==
- Ralf Möller as Kjartan
- Ingibjörg Stefánsdóttir as Gudrun
- Sven-Ole Thorsen as Gunnar
- Þórir Waagfjörð as Bolli
- Hinrik Ólafsson as Ketil (as Hinrik Ólafson)
- Jón Baldvinsson as Thord the Strong
- Gunnar Eyjólfsson as Eirik the White
- Rúrik Haraldsson as Magnus the lawgiver
- Bjørn Floberg as Sighvat
- Raimund Harmstorf as Valgard
- Egill Ólafsson as Hrut the bowman
- Magnús Ólafsson as Bjorn

== See also ==
- List of historical drama films
- Njal's Saga
