= When the Raven Flies =

1984 Icelandic film by Hrafn Gunnlaugsson

Hrafninn Flýgur
- Original theatrical release poster
- Directed by: Hrafn Gunnlaugsson
- Written by: Hrafn Gunnlaugsson; Bo Jonsson
- Produced by: Bo Jonsson
- Starring: Jakob Þór Einarsson; Edda Björgvinsdóttir; Helgi Skúlason; Egill Ólafsson; Flosi Ólafsson; Gotti Sigurdarson
- Cinematography: Tony Forsberg
- Edited by: Hrafn Gunnlaugsson
- Music by: Hans-Erik Philip (original version); Harry Manfredini (US version)
- Production companies: Viking Film; Svenska Filminstitutet (SFI); Icelandic Film Center
- Distributed by: Svenska Filminstitutet
- Release date: 4 February 1984
- Running time: 109 minutes
- Countries: Iceland; Sweden
- Language: Icelandic

When the Raven Flies (original Icelandic: Hrafninn flýgur) is a 1984 Icelandic-Swedish adventure film written and directed by Hrafn Gunnlaugsson. The story is set in Viking Age Iceland. The film was selected as the Icelandic entry for the Best Foreign Language Film at the 57th Academy Awards, but was not accepted as a nominee.

Although mainly a tale of personal revenge, When the Raven Flies bears some resemblance to the classic Akira Kurosawa film Yojimbo and A Fistful of Dollars of Sergio Leone, sharing common plot events, characters, and action sequences, which itself drew inspiration from Dashiell Hammett's Red Harvest. Gunnlaugsson also drew inspiration from the Sagas of Icelanders and aimed to deconstruct the Viking stereotypes, replacing them with more authentic portrayals of the Viking era.

When the Raven Flies is the first film of the Raven Trilogy (also known as the Viking Trilogy) that consists of three Viking films: When the Raven Flies (1984, usually known as simply The Raven or Revenge of the Barbarians), In the Shadow of the Raven (1987, original Icelandic title: Í skugga hrafnsins) and Embla (1991, original Icelandic title: Hvíti víkingurinn), which is a director's cut of The White Viking.

== Plot ==
In the opening scene in Ireland, a young boy loses his parents in a Viking raid, but is spared in spite of the command of Thord, the Vikings' leader, to kill him. His sister is kidnapped by the Vikings. Twenty years later, the boy has become a man and travels to Iceland to seek revenge against the perpetrators and find his sister. His name is never revealed, and he is only known as "Gestur" by the characters in the film since he is a stranger to them. "Gestur" simply means "guest" but is also not an uncommon given name.

With two of the Viking raiders now living in exile from Norway and king Harald Hairfair, Gestur coldly plays their gangs against each other to get his revenge. He stays out of sight, only revealing himself through his killings and to Erik, Thord's fosterbrother. He slays several of Thord's men and then frames Erik's gang for it. Thord is led to believe that Erik is plotting against him with king Harald and is lying about the Gestur character. Thord's younger brother encourages this thinking - it is later revealed that he is the one plotting to overthrow Thord and take his position. Thord is eventually driven to attack Erik and his men, killing them all.

Gestur discovers that Thord is married to the now adult sister and they have a young son. Gestur reveals himself to his long lost sister, but she is still a Christian like their father raised them and does not help Gestur's plans to assassinate Thord.

Thord is a devout Norse paganist. Gestur secretly manipulates Thord's altar, leading Thord to believe that the gods demand his son, Einar, as a sacrifice. In her desperation, Gestur's sister reveals her brother was the one who manipulated the altar and leads Thord and his gang to capture Gestur. He refuses to reveal who he is, even under brutal torture. The guilt-stricken sister frees him in secret, and the badly wounded Gestur escapes to Erik's grave.

Thord decides that he will use Gestur's trick against him. He secretly confides with Odin that he will use the ceremony as a hoax to lure Gestur out to save Einar. In the middle of the ceremony, Gestur suddenly reveals himself in Erik's funeral cloth. When Thord's arrows fail to kill Gestur, Thord's followers mistake him for Erik's vengeful ghost and flees. Gestur is secretly wearing armor beneath his cloak which allows him to get in range of Thord and his brother, revealing his true identity and killing them both.

Gestur buries his weapons and asks his sister and her son to come with him back to Ireland. He claims that he will now abandon violence and live a Christian life. His sister refuses and says that her son is "old enough to have seen too much", using the same words that Thord used twenty years ago when he ordered the killing of Gestur. In the final scene of the film, Einar looks after Gestur in anger and digs up Gestur's buried weapons, presumably to avenge his father and continue the cycle of violence.

== Cast ==
- Jakob Þór Einarsson as Gestur
- Helgi Skúlason as Thord
- Edda Björgvinsdóttir as Gestur's Sister
- Egill Ólafsson as Thord's Brother
- Flosi Ólafsson as Erik
- Gotti Sigurdarson (as Gottskálk D. Sigurdarson) as Einar, son of Thord
- Sveinn M. Eiðsson as Guard
- Þráinn Karlsson as Olaf the Childlover
- Júlíus Hjörleifsson as Hjörleifur
- Pétur Einarsson as Slaver with heavy knife
- Þorsteinn Gunnarsson as Leader of the merchants
- Haukur & Hörður Harðarson as the Knife-Twins
- Gunnar Jónsson as Erik's Retainer
- Guðrún Kristín Magnúsdóttir

== Production ==
Hrafn Gunnlaugsson and Bo Jonsson both wanted to make a viking film, but do it unlike the depictions of vikings as done in Hollywood films. Their original plan was to adapt Nobel Prize in Literature-recipient Halldór Laxness' novel Gerpla into a film. Laxness was willing the sell them the film rights but advised against making the film. Laxness believed that since his novel was written as a response to the saga-genre, a film version had to be based in a viking film genre which Laxness did not believe existed. Hrafn and Jonsson attempted to write a screenplay, but found that they shared Laxness' sentiment. Instead they decided to rework the research and concept art they already had for an original film. Hrafn decided to use the films of Sergio Leone as an inspiration and added several elements from various Icelandic sagas into the film. Karl Júlíusson was recruited to make the costumes. At the time Karl ran a leather shop in Reykjavík. This was his first film. Danish composer Hans-Erik Philip was hired to compose a score, inspired by the scores of Ennio Morricone. Sigvaldi Kaldalóns's Á Sprengisandi was used as the main theme. Most of the film was shot in southern Iceland, at Kleifarvatn and Reynisdrangar and around Skogar and Vík í Mýrdal.

== Awards ==
- Hrafn Gunnlaugsson won the 1985 Guldbagge Award for Best Director.
- Hrafn Gunnlaugsson was nominated for the 1986 International Fantasy Film Award for Best Film.

== In popular culture ==
Dutch comics artist Erik Kriek has cited When the Raven Flies as a major inspiration to his graphic novel De Balling (2019), which is also a revenge story set in the Viking Age.

== See also ==
- List of submissions to the 57th Academy Awards for Best Foreign Language Film
- List of Icelandic submissions for the Academy Award for Best Foreign Language Film
