= As in Heaven (1992 film) =

1992 film

- Directed by: Kristín Jóhannesdóttir
- Written by: Kristín Jóhannesdóttir
- Produced by: Sigurður Pálsson
- Starring: Tinna Gunnlaugsdóttir
- Cinematography: Snorri Þórisson
- Edited by: Sigurður Snæberg
- Music by: Hilmar Örn Hilmarsson
- Release date: 29 August 1992
- Running time: 122 minutes
- Country: Iceland
- Language: Icelandic

As in Heaven (Icelandic: Svo á jörðu sem á himni) is a 1992 Icelandic drama film directed by Kristín Jóhannesdóttir. It was screened out of competition at the 1992 Cannes Film Festival. The film was selected as the Icelandic entry for the Best Foreign Language Film at the 65th Academy Awards, but was not nominated.

== Cast ==
- Tinna Gunnlaugsdóttir as Mother
- Pierre Vaneck as Dr. Charcot
- Christian Charmetant as Burte
- Valdimar Örn Flygenring as Kristjan
- Sigríður Hagalín as Grand mother
- Daniel Agust Haraldsson
- Páll Óskar Hjálmtýsson
- Álfrún Örnólfsdóttir as Hrefna
- Christophe Pinon as Gonidec
- Helgi Skúlason as Grand father

== See also ==
- List of submissions to the 65th Academy Awards for Best Foreign Language Film
- List of Icelandic submissions for the Academy Award for Best Foreign Language Film
