= Gísli Halldórsson =

Icelandic actor

- Born: 2 February 1927
- Died: 27 July 1998 (aged 71)
- Occupation: Actor

Gísli Halldórsson (2 February 1927 – 27 July 1998) was an Icelandic actor of theatre, radio, film and television, and one of the most popular Icelandic actors of the late twentieth century. He is known internationally for playing the lead role in Children of Nature, which was nominated for an Academy Award as best foreign language film in 1992.

== Selected filmography ==
- Dansinn (1998, posthumous release)
- Djöflaeyjan (1996)
- Sigla himinfley (1994)
- Á köldum klaka (1995)
- Skýjahöllin (1994)
- Tveir á báti (1992)
- Karlakórinn Hekla (1992)
- Ingaló (1992)
- Children of Nature (1991)
- Áramótaskaup 1991
- Kristnihald undir jökli (1989)
- Áramótaskaup 1987
- Áramótaskaup 1986
- Jón Oddur & Jón Bjarni (1981) – Kormákur afi
