= Egill Ólafsson =

Icelandic singer and actor (born 1953)

Egill Ólafsson is an Icelandic singer, songwriter, and actor of stage and screen.

== Early life and education ==
Egill Ólafsson studied playing guitar and piano when he was young and was part of a boys' brass band under the direction of Karl Otto Runólfsson.

While he was a student at Hamrahlid College from 1970 until 1974, Egill Ólafsson sang in the choir of the school Kór MH.

1970 he started to study at the Tónlistarskólinn (music school in Reykjavík). The disciplines he was studying were singing and composing. In 1976 Egill Ólafsson graduated at Tónlistarskólinn In Reykjavík.

== Career ==
=== Music ===
Among his compositions are music for choirs, brass band music and music for strings and trumpets. He has composed around 30 theatrical works. He composed for musicals Grettir, Eva Luna and Come Dance With Me, the latter having a run on off-Broadway in 1996. His works have been played by various ensembles like Spilverk þjóðanna, Stuðmenn, Hinn íslenski Þursaflokkur, Tríó Björns Thoroddsen, Blái hatturinn, Les Grand Tango and The Icelandic Sound Company. And just recently (2015–16) he's been working with the German group Strom & Wasser as a co-writer and musician. The product has been released by Traumton in Berlin, called "Reykjavik" (Double Album).

Under the mononym Egill he released a number of albums, mainly with Stuðmenn / Spilverk þjóðanna labels. He also co-wrote materials with Finnish artist Matti Kallio, a resident of Iceland.

=== Acting ===
He has landed many stage roles in Icelandic theatre, and film roles in Icelandic, German, and Scandinavian films.

Egill Ólafsson also is a performer in musical theatre. Several times he was performing leading characters in the Icelandic productions of different musicals at the National Theatre of Iceland, for instance Evita (Perón), Carmen negra (Escamillo), Three Penny Opera (Peachum), Kiss Me, Kate (Fred Graham) and also in many of the plays he has written as composer.

He appeared as Javert in Vesalingarnir, the Icelandic adaptation of Les Misérables at the National Theatre, after having played the role of Jean Valjean in the same musical a quarter of a century earlier. At Les Misérables: The Dream Cast in Concert on the occasion of the 10th anniversary of the opening of the Original West End production of the musical Les Misérables Egill Ólafsson was performing as one of the Seventeen Valjeans at the second encore. It was filmed in October 1995 at the Royal Albert Hall and released on DVD, VHS and LaserDisc distributed by Sony Pictures (US/CAN) and BBC Video (UK).

In 1995, he appeared in a main role as Richter, the magistrate, in the drama feature film Agnes.

Ólafsson starred in the 2024 romantic drama Snerting for which he won the 2025 Edda Award for Best Leading Actor.

== Other activities ==
At the elections for the Icelandic parliament Althing in April 2013, Egill Ólafsson was a candidate of Lýðræðisvaktin (Iceland Democratic Party).

== Recognition and awards ==
In October 2013 his work was honored by FTT (Society Of Songwriters In Iceland).

On 17 June 2015 his work was honored by the President of Iceland. Egill Ólafsson was awarded with the Falcon Order Medal.

In October 2022, it was revealed that Egill had been diagnosed with Parkinson's disease.

== Personal life ==
Before the Icelandic loan guarantees referendum, 2010 Egill Ólafsson was one of the Icelandic celebrities who spoke out to vote "no".

== Work ==
=== Discography ===
==== Albums ====
- 1991: Tifa tifa
- 1992: Blátt blátt
- 2001: Angelus Novus / Nýr engill
- 2003: Brot...Músík úr leikhúsinu
- 2006: Miskunn dalfiska
- 2007: Hymnalög
- 2012: Vetur
- 2013: Örlög mín
- 2018: Fjall

==== Singles ====
- 2013: "Ekkert þras" (with Moses Hightower, Lay Low and Högni Egilsson)

=== Filmography ===
- Touch (2024, dir. Baltasar Kormákur) - Kristófer
- The Husky in Iceland - (2014) - Narration
- Team of the Way: Part 5 - Home (2012) - Narration
- Dream about the road part 3.- The Words (2012) - Narration
- Legends of Valhalla - Thor (2011) - Main Cast (Icelandic version)
- Steindinn okkar 2 (2011) - Supporting Cast
- Dream of the Way: Part 2 - Heritage (2011) - Narration
- The Magic Wardrobe (2011) - Supporting Cast
- Mannasiðir Gillz (2010) - Supporting Cast
- Court 2 (2010) - Supporting Cast
- Dream of the Way: Part 1 - Prelude (2010) - Narration
- Big Rescue, The (2009) - Supporting Cast
- Court (2008) - Supporting Cast
- Ahead of Time (2004) - Screenplay
- Ahead of Time (2004) - Main Cast
- Crossroads (2001) - Main Cast
- Dramarama (2001) - Supporting Cast
- Angels of the Universe (2000) - Supporting Cast
- Citizen Cam (1999) - Main Cast
- Honour of the House (1999) - Supporting Cast
- Vildspor (1998) - Main Cast
- Count Me Out (1997) - Supporting Cast
- The Viking Sagas (1996) - Hrut the bowman
- Private Lives (1995) - Supporting Cast
- Agnes (1995) - Richter, Main Cast
- Der Gartenkrieg (1994) - Supporting Cast
- Wallpaper: An Erotic Love Story (1992) - Supporting Cast
- Men's Choir, The (original: Karlakórinn Hekla / Der Männerchor) (1992) - Main Cast
- Children of Nature (1991) - Supporting Cast
- The White Viking (1991) - Olaf Tryggvason
- Rust (1990) - Music Composer
- Rust (1990) - Main Cast
- Stalin Is Not Here - Main Cast
- Under the Glacier (1989) - Supporting Cast
- Magnus (1989) - Main Cast
- Pretty Angels (1989) - Main Cast
- In the Shadow of the Raven (1988) - Hjörleifur Hörthursson
- Cool Jazz and Coconuts (1985) - Screenplay
- Cool Jazz and Coconuts (1985) - Main Cast
- Black and Without Sugar (1985) - Music Composer
- When the Raven Flies (1984) - Thord's brother
- Golden Gate, The (1984) - Supporting Cast
- Inter Nos (1982) - Music Composer
- On Top (1982) - Main Cast
- Twins, The (1981) - Supporting Cast
- Twins, The (1981) - Music Performers
- Twins, The (1981) - Music Composer
- Silfurtunglið (1978) - Music Composer
- Silfurtunglið (1978) - Main Cast

=== Compositions ===
(Music composed for theatre)

- The City Of Crooks 1976 The Theatre School Of Iceland
- The Beginners 1977 The National Theatre of Iceland
- Mr. Klemensson 1978 (Ballet) NT (Icel)
- The Cheery´s On The North - Mountain (Kabuki – Play) 1979 NT (Icel) /Det Norske Teater
- The Saga Of Grettir 1980 City Theatre in Iceland
- Schocklate For Silja 1982 NT (Icel)
- Ich tanze mit dir (Ballet) NT (Icel) 1987
- The Steamship 1990 / The Theatre School Of Iceland
- Platanov 1992 City Theatre in Reykjavík/Malmö Statsteater
- Uncle Vanja 1992 City Theatre in Reykjavík
- Eva Luna (The Musical) 1994 (The Musical) City Theatre in Reykjavík
- Tears And Endearment (original Icelandic title: Þrek og tár) 1995 NT (Icel)
- As You Like It 1996 NT (Icel)
- Come Dance With Me 1997 Cernucini Teatre (Off – BRDW)
- Mice And Man Loftkastalinn 1998
- Anna Karenina NT (Icel.) 1999
- Day Of Hope City Theatre in Reykjavík 2006
- Four Jews On Parnassus Neue Nationalgalerie Berlin - 3 November 2008
- Viva la Vida/Frida Kahló NT (Icel) 2009
- The Women Of The Parlament NT (Icel) 2013
