= Óðsmál =

Óðsmál is a research project, starting 1990, conducted by Guðrún Kristín Magnúsdóttir.

The research is done at Guðrún's Óðsmál-research institute, Freyjukettir – Norræn menning, in Iceland. The research is inspired by Maharishi Mahesh Yogi, founder of Transcendental Meditation. Guðrún met Maharishi in 1962.

The Óðsmál research is revealed as a series of books and online lectures reflecting many new theories and insights into spirituality, the profundity of meaning inherent in Heathenry, Paganry, Asatru (Icelandic: Ásatrú), the Viking spiritual heritage, "vor forni siður" ("our ancient tradition").

The purpose of Óðsmál is to easily make everyone literate on the symbolic language and allegory of Norse Edda poems and myths.

== Books ==
The Óðsmál series were funded by the Icelandic Ministry of Education, Science and Culture in 2011, and Hagthenkir (the Association of Non-fiction and Educational Writers in Iceland).

=== Adult books ===
In 2015, 93 Óðsmál books have been published in two languages, Icelandic and English, including:

- Óðsmál. In Icelandic and English. Published 1996, ISBN 9979601655
- Óðsmál in fornu: efnisyfirlit vefútgáfu. In Icelandic, 2010, ISBN 9789935409409
- Valhallar Óðsmál in gullnu: Handa þróuðum, vísindi, skilningur og djúp þekking forfeðra okkar enduruppgötvuð. In Icelandic, 2010, ISBN 9789935409416
- Skírnismál: helgileikar: handrit handa börnum / A script for bairns: ritual performance. In Icelandic and English, 2012, ISBN 9789935409836
- Óðsmál 2012: Ævi hver til uppljómunar. In Icelandic, ISBN 9789935409829
- Óðsmál – The Unseen Reality: Science of Consciousness in Heathenry. In English, 2013, ISBN 9789935409843
- Óðsmál – Norse Edda Spiritual Highlights: We should know why we choose to be born. In English, 2014, ISBN 9789935467003
- How to Lay the Bridge Bifröst. In English, 2015, ISBN 9789935467485
- Consciousness and Mother Nature: What is Pure Consciousness and what is Mother Nature? Gain intellectual understanding from Óðsmál-books. In English, 2015, ISBN 9789935467508
- Baldur Höður Loki: What are we celebrating and why? Óðsmál gives intellectual understanding. In English, 2015, ISBN 9789935467539
- Að leggja Bifröst lag fyrir lag. In Icelandic, 2015, ISBN 9789935467492
- Baldur Höður Loki: Lesum Óðsmál til að skilja. In Icelandic, 2015, ISBN 9789935467522
- Vitund og móðir náttúra: Nemum upp ámáttkar fimbulrúnir. In Icelandic, 2015, ISBN 9789935467515
- Óðsmál for bairns, a series of 40 books, an English translation of Krakka-Óðsmál in fornu, (note: "bairns" means "children" in Old English), published 2014
- Krakka-Óðsmál in fornu, a series of 40 books. (Note: "krakkar" means "children" in Icelandic). Published 2011

The 40 books in the Krakka-Óðsmál in fornu series are:

1. Þór ISBN 9789935409423
2. Ægir og Rán ISBN 9789935409430
3. Þríeindir ISBN 9789935409447
4. Þjóðvitnir, Ullur, Heimdallur ISBN 9789935409454
5. Tefla teitir á Iðavöllum unz koma þursamegir III ISBN 9789935409461
6. Syn, Glasir, Valhöll, Einherjar ISBN 9789935409478
7. Sif, Gefjun ISBN 9789935409485
8. Freyr, Skírnir, Gerður ISBN 9789935409492
9. Segðu mér, seiðskrati ISBN 9789935409508
10. Uppeldi ISBN 9789935409515
11. Rígur ISBN 9789935409522
12. Jól, þorri, gói ISBN 9789935409539
13. Helía, Mímir, valkyrja ISBN 9789935409546
14. Svinnur, vín Valföðurs, Gungnir, Glaðheimar ISBN 9789935409553
15. Óðinn, synir, hrafnar, eljur, Sleipnir, Valhöll ISBN 9789935409560
16. Týr, Fenrir, Drómi, Læðingur, Gleipnir ISBN 9789935409577
17. Sól og Nanna ISBN 9789935409584
18. Frigg, Sága ISBN 9789935409591
19. Fjörgyn, jörð, móðir, árstíðir, Svalinn, Mundilfari ISBN 9789935409607
20. Gyðjan mikla, Freyja með Brísingamen ISBN 9789935409614
21. Skaði, Njörður, Baldur ISBN 9789935409621
22. Geri, Freki, jötnar ISBN 9789935409638
23. Jólasveinar, álfar, gandreið ISBN 9789935409645
24. Guðin, dagarnir, reikistjörnurnar, mannsheilinn ISBN 9789935409652
25. Haftsænir, Gapþrosnir og fleira torskilið – ja bara óskiljanlegt ISBN 9789935409669
26. Ginnungagap – höfuðskepnurnar 5 ISBN 9789935409676
27. Ginnungagap – nýsta ek niður ISBN 9789935409683
28. Þund, heilög vötn hlóa ISBN 9789935409690
29. Íslenska, samskrít ISBN 9789935409706
30. Huginn, Muninn, Valhöll, einherjar ISBN 9789935409713
31. Tært taugakerfi ISBN 9789935409720
32. Tröll, jötnar, þursar, vættir, dvergar, þursameyjar, framþróun ISBN 9789935409737
33. Urður, Verðandi, Skuld ISBN 9789935409744
34. Yfir heiðina með vitkanum ISBN 9789935409751
35. Hljóð og efni ISBN 9789935409768
36. Hin árborna ámáttka, Grótti, þanþol, meiðmar ISBN 9789935409775
37. Vitundarþroskamenntun handa öllum ISBN 9789935409782
38. Að heyja frið, stjórnarskrá alheims ISBN 9789935409799
39. Matur, melting, hegðan ISBN 9789935409805
40. Ósvinnan horfin, Mímir endurheimtur ISBN 9789935409812

=== Children's books ===
The following are Óðsmál for bairns, a series of 40 books, an English translation of Krakka-Óðsmál in fornu, published 2014:

- Óðsmál for bairns 1 Þór ISBN 9789935467010
- Óðsmál for bairns 2 Ægir and Rán ISBN 9789935467027
- Óðsmál for bairns 3 trinities ISBN 9789935467034
- Óðsmál for bairns 4 Þjóðvitnir, Ullur, Heimdallur ISBN 9789935467041
- Óðsmál for bairns 5 In Iðavellir - triguna ISBN 9789935467058
- Óðsmál for bairns 6 Syn Glasir Valhöll einherjar ISBN 9789935467065
- Óðsmál for bairns 7 Sif Easter ISBN 9789935467072
- Óðsmál for bairns 8 Freyr Skírnir Gerður - poem Skírnismál ISBN 9789935467089
- Óðsmál for bairns 9 Tell me, wizard ISBN 9789935467096
- Óðsmál for bairns 10 Upbringing ISBN 9789935467102
- Óðsmál for bairns 11 Rígur (on Edda-poem Rígsþula) ISBN 9789935467119
- Óðsmál for bairns 12 Yule, þorri, gói ISBN 9789935467126
- Óðsmál for bairns 13 Hel, Mímir, valkyrja ISBN 9789935467133
- Óðsmál for bairns 14 Svinnur, Valföðurs wine, Gungnir, Glaðheimar ISBN 9789935467140
- Óðsmál for bairns 15 Óðinn, sons, Sleipnir, Valhöll ISBN 9789935467157
- Óðsmál for bairns 16 Týr and Fenrir ISBN 9789935467164
- Óðsmál for bairns 17 Sól and Nanna ISBN 9789935467171
- Óðsmál for bairns 18 Frigg, Sága ISBN 9789935467188
- Óðsmál for bairns 19 Fjörgyn, Mother Earth ISBN 9789935467195
- Óðsmál for bairns 20 The Great Goddess ISBN 9789935467201
- Óðsmál for bairns 21 Skaði, Njörður, Baldur ISBN 9789935467218
- Óðsmál for bairns 22 Jötnar, Geri, Freki ISBN 9789935467225
- Óðsmál for bairns 23 Jólasveinar, elves, gandreið ISBN 9789935467232
- Óðsmál for bairns 24 Gods, days, planets, and more ISBN 9789935467249
- Óðsmál for bairns 25 Haftsænir, Gapþrosnir, Geirölnir, valkyrja ISBN 9789935467256
- Óðsmál for bairns 26 Ginnungagap and the 5 elements ISBN 9789935467263
- Óðsmál for bairns 27 Ginnungagap - nýsta ek niður ISBN 9789935467270
- Óðsmál for bairns 28 Þund ISBN 9789935467287
- Óðsmál for bairns 29 Sanskrit and Old Norse ISBN 9789935467294
- Óðsmál for bairns 30 Huginn, Muninn, Valhöll, einherjar ISBN 9789935467300
- Óðsmál for bairns 31 Pure nervous system ISBN 9789935467317
- Óðsmál for bairns 32 Tröll, jötnar, thurse-maidens, wights, dwarfs ISBN 9789935467324
- Óðsmál for bairns 33 Urður, Verðandi, Skuld ISBN 9789935467331
- Óðsmál for bairns 34 Guided bird's eye view ISBN 9789935467348
- Óðsmál for bairns 35 Sound and "matter" ISBN 9789935467355
- Óðsmál for bairns 36 Mighty old Nature ISBN 9789935467362
- Óðsmál for bairns 37 Consciousness-based education ISBN 9789935467379
- Óðsmál for bairns 38 Waging peace ISBN 9789935467386
- Óðsmál for bairns 39 Food, digestion, behaviour ISBN 9789935467393
- Óðsmál for bairns 40 Ignorance gone, Mímir regained ISBN 9789935467409
