= Cold Fever =

1994 film by Friðrik Þór Friðriksson

- Icelandic theatrical poster.
- Directed by: Friðrik Þór Friðriksson
- Written by: Friðrik Þór Friðriksson; Jim Stark
- Produced by: Jim Stark
- Starring: Masatoshi Nagase; Lili Taylor; Fisher Stevens
- Cinematography: Ari Kristinsson
- Edited by: Steingrímur Karlsson
- Music by: Hilmar Örn Hilmarsson
- Distributed by: Artistic License Films; Iceland Film Corporation
- Release date: February 23, 1996 (USA)
- Running time: 85 minutes
- Country: Iceland
- Language: English / Icelandic / Japanese
- Budget: ISK 130,000,000

Cold Fever (Icelandic: Á köldum klaka) is a 1995 Icelandic film directed by Friðrik Þór Friðriksson. It is a road movie set in Iceland and was the first of Friðrik's films to be made in the English language. The movie depicts the travels of a Japanese man across Iceland. It was jokingly promoted as the best Icelandic-Japanese road movie of 1995.

== Synopsis ==
Hirata is a successful Japanese businessman whose plan for a two-week winter holiday in Hawaii to play golf changes when his elderly grandfather reminds him that he should go to Iceland. Hirata's parents died there seven years ago, and the seven-year anniversary of a death is a significant event in Japanese culture. Hirata must perform a ceremony in the river where they died after drowning in an avalanche – the drowned must be fed by the surviving family members if they are to find peace.

Hirata arrives in Reykjavík, Iceland. Trying to reach the river on the far side of the island, he encounters a series of mishaps, starting when he gets on a bus taking German tourists to the Blue Lagoon instead of a bus into the city. After his first day's misadventures, Hirata decides to purchase an ancient, bright red Citroën DS to make the journey. During the long drive, Hirata meets several strange people along the way. These include the mystical woman who sells him the car, which only plays one radio station. Next, Hirata meets a local woman who collects photographs of funerals. The following day, he meets Jack and Jill, two American hitchhikers, who turn out to be armed and dangerous fugitives who steal his car. Nearing his destination on foot, Hirata arrives in a small village where he meets an old man named Siggi, the owner of a local lodge, who teaches him how to drink the most potent alcoholic beverage in Iceland.

After explaining his determination to travel to where his parents died, Hirata is aided by Siggi who borrows a pair of Icelandic horses from a local farmer, and the two of them travel on horseback to the river. After riding across a glacier, over a ridge and into the valley where Hirata's parents died, Hirata dismounts and tells Siggi that he must go on alone to complete his journey. After traversing a rickety bridge to the river, Hirata arrives at the river bank where he performs his cleansing ceremony at last. He then rejoins Siggi, and they begin the journey back towards Reykjavík.

== Credits ==
=== Cast ===
- Masatoshi Nagase: Hirata
- Lili Taylor: Jill
- Fisher Stevens: Jack
- Gísli Halldórsson: Siggi
- Seijun Suzuki: Grandfather
- Laura Huges: Laura
- Jóhannes B. Guðmundsson: Old Man
- Bríet Héðinsdóttir: Old Woman
- Guðmundur Karl Sigurdórsson: Guest at Thorrablot (uncredited)
- Magnús Ólafsson
- Rúrik Haraldsson
- Flosi Ólafsson: Hotel owner
- Ari Matthíasson
- Álfrún Örnólfsdóttir
- Hallbjörn Hjartarson: Cowboy of the North
- Katrín Ólafsdóttir

=== Crew ===
- Director: Friðrik Þór Friðriksson
- Screenplay: Jim Stark and Friðrik Þór Friðriksson
- Producer: Jim Stark
- Co-producer: George Gund III
- Executive producer: Reinhard Brundig, Peter Aalbæk Jensen, and Christa Saredi
- Line producer: Ari Kristinsson
- Director of Photography: Ari Kristinsson
- Production Designer: Árni Páll Jóhannsson
- Editor: Steingrímur Karlsson
- Film edition: Steingrímur Karlsson
- Sound Design: Kjartan Kjartansson
- Sound edition: Ingvar Lundberg
- Music: Hilmar Örn Hilmarsson
  - Featuring “Killer Boogie” by Þeyr
- Costume design: María Ólafsdóttir
- Production manager: Inga Björk Sólnes
- Gaffer: Andreas Burkhard
- Generator operator: Eggert Einarsson
- Still photography: Mark Higashino
- Script supervisor: Inga Lísa Middleton
- Colour grader: Petra Schütt
- Production: Icelandic Film Corporation, Iciclefilm, Pandora Film, Sunrise Inc., Zentropa Entertainments, George Gund III
- Support: Film Fond of Hamburg

== Critical response ==
On review aggregator website Rotten Tomatoes, the film holds an approval rating of 95% based on 20 reviews, and an average rating of 7.5/10.

== See also ==
The Goddess of 1967, another movie in which a successful Japanese man travels foreign land in a newly purchased bright (this time pink) 1967 Citroen DS and meets strange characters, though this time in Australia.
