= Agnes (1995 film) =

1995 Icelandic drama film

- Directed by: Egill Eðvarðsson
- Written by: Jon Asgeir Hreinsson; Snorri Þórisson
- Produced by: Snorri Þórisson
- Starring: María Ellingsen; Baltasar Kormákur; Egill Ólafsson
- Cinematography: Snorri Þórisson
- Edited by: Steingrímur Karlsson
- Music by: Gunnar Þórðarson
- Distributed by: Nordisk Film Biografdistribution
- Release date: 23 December 1995 (Iceland)
- Running time: 101 minutes
- Countries: France; Germany; Norway; Iceland
- Language: Icelandic

Agnes is a 1995 Icelandic-German-Danish film directed by Egill Eðvarðsson and starring María Ellingsen. It is based on the story of Agnes Magnúsdóttir, the last woman to be executed in Iceland.

== Synopsis ==
The film is a fictional retelling of the events leading up to the execution of Agnes Magnúsdóttir, the last woman to be executed in Iceland.

Agnes became an outcast in the community after having a child out of wedlock, and is now employed by the local magistrate, Richter, who is employed by the Danish Government (which at that time governed Iceland). He often tries to rape her, but she repels his advances. After Richter calls in local homeopath Natan to help to deliver his wife's baby, Agnes falls for Natan and is seduced by him. However, it becomes evident that Natan has only used her to help him rob Richter's property. Agnes is sold to Natan. Natan is a womaniser and a jealous husband takes revenge. Agnes is later unfairly held responsible for his accidental death.

== Cast ==
- María Ellingsen as Agnes
- Egill Ólafsson as Richter, a local magistrate (sheriff) representing the Danish Government
- Baltasar Kormákur as Natan Ketilsson, a homeopath
- Hilmir Snær Guðnason as Guðmundur
- Magnús Ólafsson as Eyfi
- Gudony Gudlaughdottir as Solveig/Sólvegi
- Hanna María Karlsdóttir as Richter's wife
- Gottskálk Dagur Sigurðarson as Fridrik

== Production ==
Agnes is an Icelandic-German-Danish co-production. Production was through Pegasus Pictures in Reykjavik, Journal Film in Berlin, and Zentropa in Copenhagen.

The screenplay was written by Jon Asgeir Hreinsson and Snorri Þórisson (Thorisson), who was also responsible for cinematography. It was directed by Egill Eðvarðsson, who previously directed the 1983 horror film The House. It was produced by Snorri Þórisson, while Peter Aalbaek Jensen and Klaus Volkenborn were co-producers. Þórisson, then CEO of Pegasus Pictures, later went on to produce Game of Thrones while they filmed in Iceland, among other work.

The score was created by Icelandic composer Gunnar Þórðarson. Steingrimur Karlsson edited the film. Its running time is 104 minutes.

Interviews with actors Magnús Ólafsson and Hilmir Snær Guðnason were included in an article about the film published in Helgarpósturinn ("The Weekend Post") in December 2012.

== Release ==
Agnes premiered in the Panorama section of the Berlin Film Festival on 17 February 1996.

International sales were handled by Pinnacle Pictures in London.

== Reception ==
David Stratton, reviewing the film for Variety at the Berlin Film Festival, wrote "Ellingsen gives an effective performance as the feisty, hedonistic and ultimately doomed heroine", and praised Edvardsson's direction, as well as Snorri Þórisson's "splendid work as cinematographer".

Rain's Place also praised the cinematography, as well as the "haunting musical score [which] is framed in contrast with the violence of the story".

=== Accolades ===
Ellingsen won Best Actress at the Schermi d'amore film festival in Verona, Italy for her role in the film.
