= Gnarr =

2010 film

- Film poster
- Directed by: Gaukur Úlfarsson
- Produced by: Sigvaldi J. Kárason; Bjorn Ofeigsson
- Starring: Jón Gnarr
- Cinematography: Bjorn Ofeigsson
- Release date: 12 November 2010
- Running time: 93 minutes
- Country: Iceland
- Language: Icelandic

Gnarr is a 2010 Icelandic documentary film directed by Gaukur Úlfarsson. The film follows the political campaign of Jón Gnarr, a former punk rocker with no background in politics that formed his own party – the Best Party – and became the mayor of Reykjavík.

== Cast ==
- Jón Gnarr as Gnarr
