= Gaukur Úlfarsson =

Icelandic director

- Born: 11 September 1973 (age 51)
- Occupation: film maker

Gaukur Úlfarsson (born 11 September 1973) is an Icelandic film director.

Gaukur began his career directing advertisements and music videos. In the 2003 Edda Awards, he won the Music Video of the Year (Tónlistarmyndband ársins) for Mess It Up by Quarashi.

Gaukur directed and wrote the TV Series Sjáumst með Silvíu Nótt from 2005 with the alter-ego talk show host Silvía Night. Gaukur also directed the series Djók í Reykjavík from 2018 with Dóri DNA.

In 2010, Gaukur directed the documentary Gnarr, which followed the political campaign of comedian Jón Gnarr to become the mayor of Reykjavík. The film was nominated for awards at CPH:DOX, the Edda Awards and the Zurich Film Festival.

In 2019, Gaukur co-directed the horror film Thirst (Þorsti), which won two awards at Screamfest Horror Film Festival.

In a blog post in 2008, Gaukur accused politician Ómar R. Valdimarsson of being a racist. Ómar sued Gaukur for defamation, demanding 2,000,000 kr (US$16,000) in damages, but Gaukur was ultimately acquitted by the Supreme Court.

== Filmography ==
- Teipið gengur (2008) (Documentary)
- Gnarr (2010) (Documentary)
- Thirst (Þorsti) (2019)
- Soviet Barbara: The Story of Ragnar Kjartansson in Moscow (2023) (Documentary)
