= Thirst (2019 film) =

2019 film

- Film poster
- Directed by: Gaukur Úlfarsson; Steinþór Hróar Steinþórsson
- Written by: Björn Leó Brynjarsson
- Produced by: Guðrún Olsen; Haraldur Hrafn Thorlacius
- Starring: Hjörtur Sævar Steinason; Hulda Lind Kristinsdóttir; Jens Jensson; Ester Sveinbjarnardóttir; Birgitta Sigursteinsdóttir; Birna Halldórstóttir
- Cinematography: Hakon Sverrisson
- Edited by: Ágúst Bent
- Music by: David Berndsen
- Release date: 25 October 2019
- Country: Iceland
- Language: Icelandic

Thirst (Icelandic: Þorsti) is a 2019 Icelandic vampire splatter film directed by Gaukur Úlfarsson and Steinþór Hróar Steinþórsson and written by Björn Leó Brynjarsson.

== Premise ==
In a small Icelandic town, a detective named Jens investigates Hulda, who is suspected of killing her brother Steinda. Hulda's mother, who washes down pills with blue Smirnoff in the morning, also believes Hulda killed Steinda. After being released from custody due to insufficient evidence, Hulda has nowhere to go and wanders aimlessly until she encounters Hjörtur, an ancient gay vampire who admits to being lonely. Hjörtur agrees to help Hulda bring Steinda back to life, with terrible unforeseen consequences; at the same time, they must fend off Esther and Birgitta, leaders of a cult.

== Cast ==
- Hjörtur Sævar Steinason as Hjörtur
- Hulda Lind Kristinsdóttir as Hulda
- Jens Jensson as Jens
- Ester Sveinbjarnardóttir as Ester
- Birgitta Sigursteinsdóttir as Birgitta
- Birna Halldórstóttir as Birna
