= Children of Nature =

1991 film by Friðrik Þór Friðriksson

- Film poster
- Icelandic: Börn náttúrunnar
- Directed by: Friðrik Þór Friðriksson
- Written by: Friðrik Þór Friðriksson; Einar Már Guðmundsson
- Produced by: Friðrik Þór Friðriksson; Vilhjálmur Ragnarsson
- Starring: Gísli Halldórsson; Sigríður Hagalín; Baldvin Halldórsson; Björn Karlsson
- Cinematography: Ari Kristinsson
- Edited by: Skafti Gudmundsson
- Music by: Hilmar Örn Hilmarsson
- Release date: August 1, 1991
- Running time: 82 minutes
- Country: Iceland
- Languages: Icelandic; English

Children of Nature (Icelandic: Börn náttúrunnar) is a 1991 Icelandic film directed by Friðrik Þór Friðriksson. It was nominated for the Best Foreign Language Film Oscar at the 64th Academy Awards, the only Icelandic film to have ever been nominated.

== Plot ==
Þorgeir, an old man living in the Icelandic countryside, has grown too old to continue running his farm, and moves to the city, but is made to feel unwelcome in his daughter and son-in-law's urban dwelling. Dumped into a home for the elderly in Reykjavík, he meets an old girlfriend from his youth, who wants to be buried in her home village. Þorgeir steals a jeep and he and Stella elude the police. Eventually, they reach Stella's village in Hornstrandir, which has been abandoned for years. Stella dies on the beach and Þorgeir buries her, fulfilling her wish. At the end, Þorgeir walks barefoot across the rocky ground and a rescue helicopter appears, but Þorgeir vanishes in the mist.

== See also ==
- List of submissions to the 64th Academy Awards for Best Foreign Language Film
- List of Icelandic submissions for the Academy Award for Best Foreign Language Film
- List of films considered the best
