= Hrafn Gunnlaugsson =

Icelandic film director (born 1948)

- Born: 17 June 1948 (age 78); Reykjavík, Iceland
- Occupations: Director, screenwriter
- Years active: 1974–present

Hrafn Gunnlaugsson (born 17 June 1948) is an Icelandic film director. He is mostly known for his series of Viking films, sometimes called "Cod Westerns". He won the award for Best Director at the 20th Guldbagge Awards for his 1984 film When the Raven Flies.

== Life ==
Hrafn is the brother of mathematician Þorvaldur Gunnlaugsson, lawyer Snædís Gunnlaugsdóttir, and actress Tinna Gunnlaugsdóttir. He was married to Edda Kristjánsdóttir, with whom he has four children: Kristján (born 1968) who is a poet and playwright, Tinna who is an actress, Sól who is an art designer and Örk (born 1993), an artist.

== Filmography ==
- Áramótaskaupið (1974 edition)
- Óðal feðranna (1981)
- Inter Nos (Icelandic: Okkar á milli: Í hita og þunga dagsins) (1982)
- Hrafninn flýgur (When the Raven Flies) (1984)
- Middle Ages Now (Bödeln och skökan) (1986)
- Í skugga hrafnsins (In the Shadow of the Raven) (1988)
- Hvíti víkingurinn (The White Viking) (1991)
- Hin helgu vé (The Sacred Mound) (1993)
- Witchcraft (1999)
- Reykjavík í öðru ljósi (2000)
- Opinberun Hannesar (2004)
- Orðstír (in development)
