= In the Shadow of the Raven =

1988 film by Hrafn Gunnlaugsson

Í skugga hrafnsins
- Directed by: Hrafn Gunnlaugsson
- Written by: Hrafn Gunnlaugsson
- Produced by: Christer Abrahamsen
- Starring: Reine Brynolfsson; Tinna Gunnlaugsdóttir; Egill Ólafsson; Sune Mangs; Kristbjörg Kjeld
- Cinematography: Esa Vuorinen
- Edited by: Hrafn Gunnlaugsson
- Music by: Harry Manfredini; Hans-Erik Philip
- Release date: 1988
- Running time: 124 minutes
- Country: Iceland
- Languages: Icelandic, German
- Budget: ISK 200,000,000

In the Shadow of the Raven (Icelandic: Í skugga hrafnsins) is the title of a 1988 film by Hrafn Gunnlaugsson, set in Viking Age Iceland. The film was selected as the Icelandic entry for the Best Foreign Language Film at the 61st Academy Awards, but was not accepted as a nominee.

In the Shadow of the Raven is the second film of the Raven Trilogy (also known as the Viking Trilogy) that consists of three 'Viking' films:

- 1) When the Raven Flies (1984) – (original Icelandic title: Hrafninn flýgur) – usually known as simply The Raven or Revenge of the Barbarians.
- 2) In The Shadow of the Raven (1988) – (original Icelandic title: Í skugga hrafnsins).
- 3) Embla (2007) – (original Icelandic title: Hvíti víkingurinn) – the director's cut of The White Viking.

== Plot ==
The film is a loose re-telling of the legend of Tristan and Isolde. In the year 1077, Trausti returns to Iceland after having studied theology in Norway. Meanwhile, Grim, the foreman on Trausti's farm, discovers a stranded whale. However, the retainers of the cruel neighbouring chief Eirikur discovers the whale as well. As Grim brings Trausti's mother Edda, the chief of the area, they discover Eirikur attempting to steal the whale. A fight erupts between the different clans and Edda is killed in the struggle. Grim kills Eirikur in revenge, and a blood-feud between Trausti's clan and Eirikur's clan is imminent. Isold, daughter of Eirikur was promised to Hjörleifur the bishop's son, but falls in love with Trausti. Trausti and Isold are attacked in their house after Isold's daughter was kidnapped and Isold is killed, but Trausti escapes. The bishop is killed in the tit-for-tat feuding. Trausti tries to make peace with Hjörleifur, but is betrayed and again narrowly escapes death. He takes his revenge on Hjörleifur. The bishop's wife, having lost everything sets fire to the church.

== Cast ==
- Reine Brynolfsson as Trausti
- Tinna Gunnlaugsdóttir as Isold
- Egill Ólafsson as Hjörleifur
- Sune Mangs as Bishop Hördur
- Kristbjörg Kjeld as Sigrid, The Shrew
- Helgi Skúlason as Grim
- Klara Íris Vigfúsdóttir as Sol
- Helga Bachmann as Edda
- Johann Neumann as Leonardo, The Artist
- Sveinn M. Eiðsson as Ketill
- Flosi Ólafsson as Eirikur
- Sigurður Sigurjónsson as Egill

Noomi Rapace made her debut as uncredited extra at the wedding scene.

== Critical response ==
In 1991, the Washington Post published a positive review of the film, critic Jeanne Cooper noting Hrafn Gunnlaugsson reaches gripping heights. The reviewer noted that the character of the bishop came off as similar to Jabba the Hutt and that Trausti's survival ability came off a Rasputin-like, but noted that this did not detract from the film. New York Times wrote in their own review the same year that "In the world of Hrafn Gunnlaugsson's medieval adventure film, The Shadow of the Raven, emotions are as jagged and windblown as the spectacular Icelandic coastline where the movie was shot". Critic Stephen Holden praised the performances of Tinna Gunnlaugsdóttir and Kristbjörg Kjeld, but panned Reine Brynolfsson as unconvincing. Holden described Sune Mang's performance as "glowering exuberance", but was critical to some of dialog delivery of the cast members, calling it "grunting".

== Connections to The Raven Flies ==
Though not a conventional sequel at first sight, the film does feature several nods to the original film. The farm Króss is shot at the very same location as Thord's farm in the original film. When Trausti opens up his father's tomb, it's the very same clifftomb featured in The Raven Flies and the father's old helmet and cape and idols of Odin and Thor are the same as in the original film. Also, Gest's throwing knives are also found in the tomb. This heavily suggest that Trausti is the descendant of Thord and Einar.

== See also ==
- List of submissions to the 61st Academy Awards for Best Foreign Language Film
- List of Icelandic submissions for the Academy Award for Best Foreign Language Film
