= Reykjavík Theatre Company =

Coordinates: 64.1291°N 21.8964°W

The Reykjavík Theatre Company (RTC, Icelandic: Leikfélag Reykjavíkur) was founded in 1897 when two existing companies in Reykjavík combined, performing in the then newly built Iðnó (transl. Craftsmens' House). With Indriði Einarsson (1851–1939) as its director, RTC became the fertile ground in which Iceland's professional theatre developed. Einarsson's dedication to professional theatre champion Sigurður Guðmundsson's (1833–1874) vision of a permanent National Theatre was key in the evolution of Iceland's professional theatre.

== History ==
RTC was the birthplace of Icelandic theatre, eventually giving rise to Þjóðleikhúsið (transl. National Theatre of Iceland) in 1950.

Some of Iceland's most critically acclaimed talent, like Stefanía Guðmundsdóttir (1876–1926), played the RTC stage. RTC has had several directors during its existence, including Einar H. Kvaran (1859–1938), Indriður Waage (1902–1963), Lárus Pálsson (1914–1968), Gerd Grieg (1895–1988), Brynjólfur Jóhannesson (1897–1974), Sveinn Einarsson (b. 1934), and Vigdís Finnbogadóttir. Sveinn was the director of RTC between 1963 and 1972, until he became the director of Þjóðleikhúsið in 1972. In 1989, RTC moved to the new city theatre.

== See also ==
- Vesturport – another Icelandic theatre group
