= National Theatre of Iceland =

Theatre in Reykjavík, Iceland

- Þjóðleikhúsið (Icelandic)
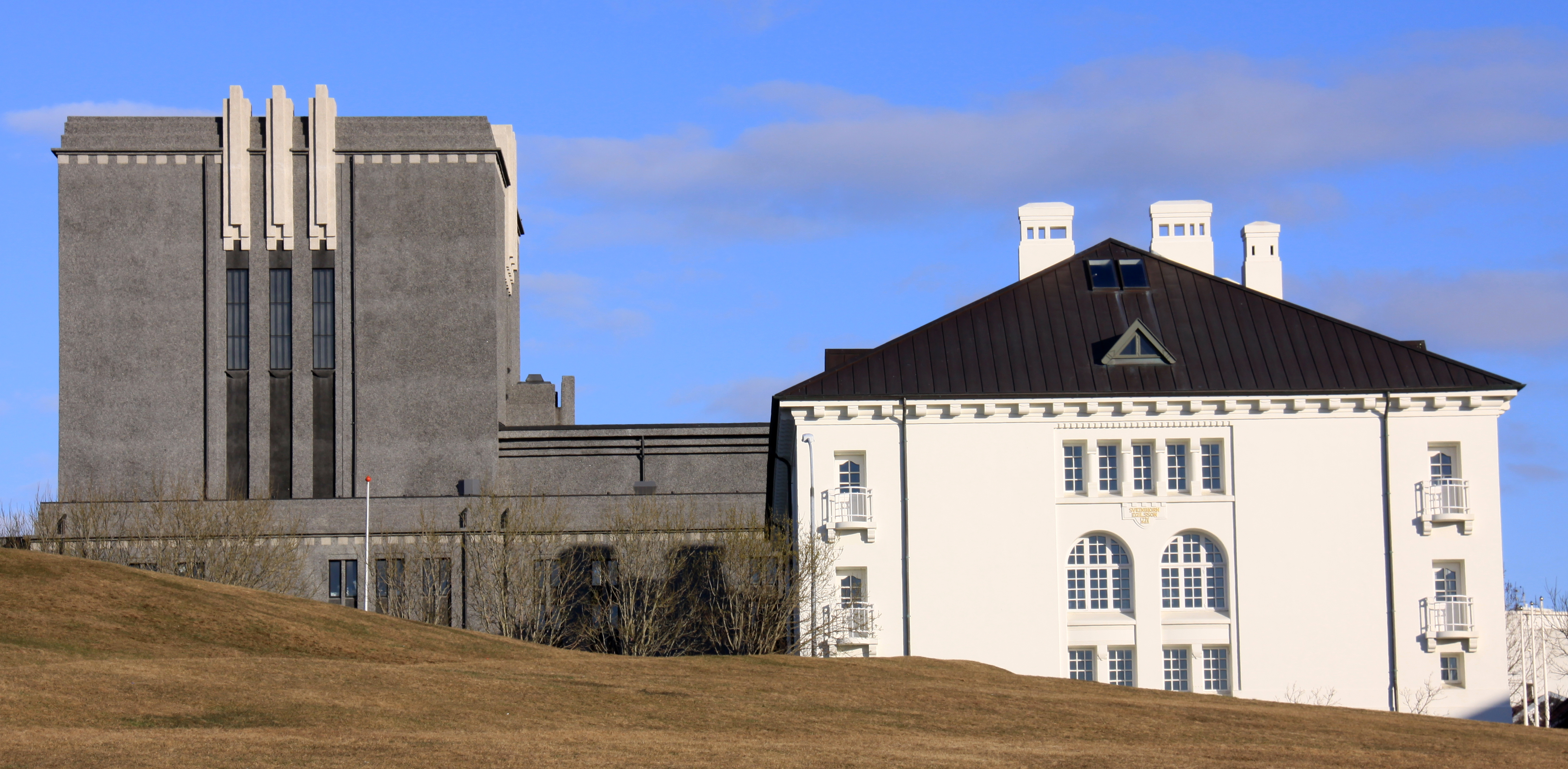
- National Theatre (left) and National Library of Iceland

- Location within Iceland
- Address: Hverfisgata 19; Reykjavík; Iceland
- Coordinates: 64.147048°N 21.92988°W
- Capacity: Stóra sviðið (lit. 'The Main Stage'); 500 seats; Kassinn (lit. 'Black Box'); 140 seats; Leikhúskjallarinn (lit. 'The Theatre Cellar'); 120 seats; Kúlan (Children's stage); 80 seats
- Type: National theatre

Construction
- Opened: 1950
- Architect: Guðjón Samúelsson

Website
- leikhusid.is

The National Theatre of Iceland (NTI; Icelandic: Þjóðleikhúsið; Icelandic pronunciation: [ˈθjouðˌleikˌhuːsɪθ]) in Reykjavík, is the national theatre of Iceland. The theater, designed by Guðjón Samúelsson, was formally opened on 20 April 1950. Since 2020, the artistic director of The National Theatre is Magnús Geir Þórðarsson.

== Productions ==
The NTI performs around thirty productions each season (new productions, re-premieres, co-productions and guest performances), comprising a varied repertoire of new Icelandic works, new foreign works, Icelandic and foreign classics, musicals, dance pieces, puppet theatre and children's productions. The theatre produces around twenty new productions each year and also collaborates with independent theatre and dance groups.

=== Touring productions ===
The NTI often tours its productions around Iceland, and many productions have also toured abroad, among them Tragedy at the Worlds Stages, Kennedy Center, Gerpla at The Bergen International Festival, Shimmer the Silver Fish at international children festivals in Sweden and Russia, The Sea Museum at the Centre Dramatique National d'Orléans and Peer Gynt at the Ibsen Festival in Oslo, Barbican Centre in London and Centre for Fine Arts in Brussels.

=== Ensemble and production ===
The NTI is an ensemble theatre with around 35 actors employed on a permanent basis and also works with actors with temporary assignments. The theatre runs its own production departments that manufacture sets, costumes and wigs, as well as productive sound and lighting departments. A normal rehearsal period is eight weeks, the last four weeks on stage. The theatre works closely with schools on all education levels.

== International collaboration ==
The NTI collaborates internationally, notably with directors and designers. Among international directors who have recently enriched the Icelandic theatre scene are Yaël Farber (My Brilliant Friend 2021), Benedict Andrews (Macbeth 2013, King Lear 2010), Stefan Metz (Tartuffe 2019, View from the Bridge 2016, Eyvindur and Halla 2015, The Crucible 2014, The Caucasian Chalk Circle 1999) and Rimas Tuminas The Seagull 1993, Don Juan 1995, Three Sisters 1997, The Cherry Orchard 2000, Richard III 2003). Other collaborations are under way.

Icelandic directors that work closely with the NTI have also gained international prestige, as theatre and film directors, among them Baltasar Kormákur (Adrift, Everest), Benedikt Erlingsson (Nordic Council Film Prize for Of Horses and Men and Woman at War), Una Þorleifsdóttir (Theatr im. Stefana Zeromskiego w Kielcach), Gísli Örn Garðarsson (Young Vic, Lyric Theatre, Royal Shakespeare Company, American Repertory Theater) and Thorleifur Örn Arnarsson (Volksbühne, Schauspiel Hannover).

== Stages ==
The NTI is situated in downtown Reykjavík. Today the theatre performs in five separate venues: the Main Stage (Stóra sviðið; 500 seats), the Black Box (Kassinn; 130 seats), the small stage for children (Kúlan; 80 seats), the experimental space the attic (Loftið; 70 seats) and the theatre cellar cabaret club (Leikhúskjallarinn; 100-120 seats).

== Artistic directors of the National Theatre ==
List of artistic directors:

1949–1972	Guðlaugur Rósinkranz
1972–1983	Sveinn Einarsson
1983–1991	Gísli Alfreðsson
1991–2004	Stefán Baldursson
2005–2015	Tinna Gunnlaugsdóttir
2015–2020	Ari Matthíasson
2020-	Magnús Geir Þórðarson
