= The Great Crossover Potential =

Greatest hits album by the Sugarcubes
- Released: 14 July 1998
- Recorded: 1987–1992
- Genre: Alternative rock
- Length: 50:33
- Labels: One Little Indian; Elektra; Polydor; Mother

The Sugarcubes chronology
It's-It (1992)	The Great Crossover Potential (1998)

Professional ratings
Review scores
Source	Rating
AllMusic	4/5 stars
NME	8/10
Robert Christgau	(2-star Honorable Mention)
Rolling Stone	4/5 stars

The Great Crossover Potential is a greatest hits album by the Sugarcubes, released on 14 July 1998. It contains tracks from the group's three studio albums, with no new tracks or remixes.

== Track listing ==
All tracks are written by the Sugarcubes.

No.	Title	Length
1.	"Birthday"	3:58
2.	"Coldsweat"	3:16
3.	"Mama"	2:56
4.	"Motorcrash"	2:23
5.	"Deus"	4:08
6.	"Regina"	4:02
7.	"Pump"	4:23
8.	"Planet"	3:22
9.	"Water"	2:59
10.	"Hit"	3:54
11.	"Vitamin"	3:42
12.	"Walkabout"	3:45
13.	"Gold"	3:38
14.	"Chihuahua"	3:29
Total length:		46:75

Notes

- Tracks 1–5 are from the Sugarcubes' debut album, Life's Too Good.
- Tracks 6–9 are from their second album, Here Today, Tomorrow Next Week!
- Tracks 10–14 are from their final album, Stick Around for Joy
