= Skytturnar (soundtrack) =

Soundtrack album by miscellaneous
- Released: November 1987
- Recorded: 1987
- Genre: Pop
- Label: Gramm; Cat. No.: Gramm 31
- Producer: Tómas Magnús Tómasson and Kjartan Kjartansson

Skytturnar is the soundtrack to the Icelandic film directed by Friðrik Þór Friðriksson in 1987. This 12" EP was released through the Gramm-label and was produced by Kjartan Kjartansson and the renowned Tómas Magnús Tómasson. The soundtrack includes contributions from several well known Icelandic artists such as Bubbi & MX-21, Hilmar Örn Hilmarsson and Sykurmolarnir (later known as The Sugarcubes) with the collaboration of Þór Eldon Jónsson (who would later join the band).

The soundtrack EP includes four of the songs used in Skytturnar. There were 14 different pieces of music used in the film, mostly as coincidental music.

== Track listing ==
Track	Title	Length	Performer	Lyrics	Audio clips
Side A
01	Skyttan	5:01	Bubbi & MX-21	-	-
Side B
01	Drekkin	01:37	Sykurmolarnir	-	-
02	Inn í Borgina	03:35	Sykurmolarnir	-	-
03	Stemning		Friðrik Erlingsson	-	-

== Track notes ==
- "Drekkin" is an Icelandic version of "Dragon", a song that appeared for the first time on The Sugarcubes’ debut album Life's Too Good in 1987.

== Credits ==
=== Performers ===
Side A:

- "Skyttan": Bubbi Morthens - music and lyrics.

Bubbi Morthens - vocals. MX-21 (Þorsteinn Magnússon - guitar. Jakob Smári Magnússon - bass. Halldór Lárusson - drums. Tómas Magnús Tómasson - keyboards).
Production: Tómas Magnús Tómasson.
Arrangements: Bubbi & MX-21 / Tómas M. Tómasson.
Recording studio: Sýrland.

Side B:

- "Drekkin": Þór Eldon Jónsson - guitar & Sykurmolarnir (Björk Guðmundsdóttir - vocals. Einar Örn Benediktsson - vocals. Þór Eldon Jónsson - guitar. Bragi Ólafsson - bass. Friðrik Erlingsson - guitar).
- "Inn í Borgina": Sykurmolarnir.
- "Stemning": Friðrik Erlingsson - guitar.

Producer: Kjartan Kjartansson. Arrangements: Sykurmolarnir.
Recording studio: Hljóðaklett.

=== Personnel ===
- Sound recording: Þorbjörn Erlingsson and Þorvar Hafsteinsson.
- Album design: Friðrik Erlingsson.
- Pressing: Prisma.
