= Margrét Vilhjálmsdóttir =

Icelandic actress (born 1966)

- Born: 10 March 1966 (age 60)
- Occupation: Actress

Margrét Vilhjálmsdóttir (born 10 March 1966) is an Icelandic actress from Reykjavík.

== Early life and education ==
Margrét Vilhjálmsdóttir (born 10. Mars 1966) is an Icelandic actress, director, and producer. Mrs. Vilhjalmsdóttir is a well-known actress in her home country for her various roles in theatre, films, TV, voice-overs in cartoons and films, and radio in Iceland. She graduated from The Icelandic Academy of Arts in 1994 (Leiklistarskólinn) and since then, performed in numerous plays/performances at The Icelandic National Theatre, Reykjavik's City Theatre, and various other Theatre's f.ex.Young Vic and Playhouse Theatre London. She also performed in Orleans and Paris, France, and The Royal Theatre Copenhagen, Denmark (guest performance).

Margrét Vilhjálmsdóttir has produced and directed her own performances, and happenings, and held several concerts supporting the environmental movement in Iceland, and other projects.

Margrét Vilhjálmsdóttir roles and performances:

Helena in "Midsommer nights dream" by William Shakespeare, Antigone in "Antigone" by Sophocles, and Varja in Summerguests by Maxim Gorky. After graduation, in the summer of 1994, she played Sheila in "The Musical Hair" in the Old Opera in Reykjavik.

1994-2004 Reykjavik's City Theater: Her first role as a young actress was the role of Disa, in an Icelandic play called "The Wish" ("Galdra - Loftur" famous Icelandic Folktale) by Jóhann Sigurjónsson, next came the main role in "The Fearless Girl" By Anton Helgi. A girl in “ The home of the dark Butterflies “ by Leena Lander, Pippi in "Pippi Longstocking" by Astrid Lindgren, "The Duplicity Opera" by Agust Gudmundson.

The Icelandic National Theatre: Annabelle in "Tis Pity She ́s a Whore" by John Ford, a young girl in "The Troll Church", and "Don Juan" by Moliere. Maggie (Margaret) in "Cat on a Hot Tin Roof" by Tennessee Williams, "Popcorn" by Ben Elton, Frida in Grandavegur 7 by Vigdis Grimsdottir, Grusha in "The Caucasian Chalk Circle" by Bertolt Brecht directed by Stephan Metz, Rosa in Independent People by Halldor Laxness, Anna Karenina in "Anna Karenina" by Leo Tolstoy, Mrs. Vilhjálmsdóttir joined The Reykjavik's City Theatre again in 2001 for the roles: of Mrs. Kapulet and Benvolio in Romeo and Juliet by William Shakespeare. Which was also played in winter 2003 in Young Vic Theatre London and winter 2003-2004 West End Theatre Playhouse London.

2004-2014 The Icelandic National Theater Elisabeth Foster Nietzsche (Nietzsche´s sister) in "The Dynamite" by Birgir Sigurðsson, various roles in "Kitchen stories" by Svava Jakobsdóttir, also shown in The royal theatre of Copenhagen, Denmark. Young woman in "A Summer Day" by Jon Fosse. Anna in "Ivanov" by Anton Chekhov, "Eight Women" by Robert Thomas co-actor: Kristjan Ingimarsson. The daughter in "The Priest's Black Dog" by Audur Ava Olafsdottir." Le Musée de la Mer" by Marie Darrieussecq that also played in Orleans and Paris, France. With Director Benedict Andrews, Goneril, the oldest daughter in "King Lear" by William Shakespeare. Lady Macbeth in "Macbeth" by William Shakespeare, Les Miserables by Victor Hugo, Woman, in "Swans do not Divorce" by Auður Ava Ólafsdóttir. The role of June in "Jerusalem" by Butterworth and Elisabeth Proctor in The Crucible by Arthur Miller.

Margrét Vilhjálmsdóttir moved with her family to Berlin in 2014 and lived there until 2020 when she moved to Tromsø Norway.

Margrét Vilhjálmsdóttir returned to the Reykjavík's city theatre in 2016 for the role of Martha in "Who's afraid of Virginia Woolf” by Edward Albee and the 2018 production the trilogy "Heaven and Hell" by Jon Kalman, Geirþrúður, which got 12 nominations.

Latest work 2021-22, A Woman in Florian Zeller ́s (The Father) play “ The Height of The Storm “ in Hålogaland Theatre (The Arctic Theatre) North Norway. Various roles: Maestra Oliviero, Signora Melina, signora Manuela Solara and Signora Airota in My Brilliant friend By Elena Ferrante in Hålogaland Theatre.

Margrét is a nature activist, and she has taken part in many actions for a nature reserve. Fighting against dams. Event and concert producer, both in the highlands and in Reykjavik Iceland.

Margret ́s work as a director, artistic director, and author:

Margrét has directed her own Site-Specific Theatre in Reykjavik and at the Reykjavik Art Festival, Iceland.

2007- “ The Goddess in The Machine “with the VDMH in the Wessel Odin in, Reykjavik Harbour at the Reykjavik Art Festival.

2009 - “Orbis Terra-ORA” Women and war- in The Icelandic Culture Heritage House, at the Reykjavik Art Festival.

2009 - “Cerebellum,” (Hnykill) A Journey Through the Unconscious and The left and Right Hemispheres, in the North Pole Theatre.

2014 - “Fantastar- a journey through a Whale”, at The Reykjavík's Art Festival.

Prices and nominations:

Margrét Vilhjálmsdóttir won the Icelandic film awards "The Eddan", for her role in "Seagull's Laughter". Margrét was also Iceland's Shooting star in the European Film Festival 2002. She got the "Stefaníu-stjakinn" Price for theater and film. She won The Gríman for Best Actress for her supporting role as Goneril in "King Lear" 2010. And she won Best Actress in the main role at The Icelandic Theatre Awards "Griman" for the main role of Elisabeth Proctor in The Crucibles by Arthur Miller

Margrét Vilhjálmsdóttir has starred in numerous films, including 2001 "Seagulls Laughter" by August Gudmundsson, 2002 "Falcons" co-starring, American Actor Keith Caredine, Director Fridrik Thor Fridriksson, 2007 The Bridegroom, Directed by Baltasar Kormakur, "Thicker than Water" Árni Óli Ásgeirsson 2008, "Mama Gogo" Fridrik Thor, Kingsroad 7, Dugg-Hole People and later Grimmd 2014, Trapped TV series 2021 and other films and TV.

Margret got The Griman - The Icelandic Drama Prize for her role as Goneril in King Lear 2011, 2014 for her performance and leading role Elisabeth Proctor, in "The Crucible" by Arthur Miller. She has been nominated at The Icelandic Theatre price "Gríman", numerous times, among other roles, Gertrude in Heaven and Hell 2018, Martha in "Who's afraid of Virginia Woolf" by Edward Alby 2016, Lady Macbeth in "Macbeth" 2012, Anna in "Ivanov" 2007, E.F. Nietzsche in Dynamite 2006, KitchenStories 2006, Swans do not Divorce and The Priest's Black Dog by A.Olafsdottir.

== Career ==
Margrét has also appeared in TV productions including Njálssaga (2003) and Ástríður (2009) as well as on the big screen. Her biggest movies are probably Mávahlátur (The Seagull's Laughter), based on the book by Kristín Marja Baldursdóttir and Falcons, in which she co-starred with Keith Carradine. Both films received international attention.

Margrét is a well-established artist in the Icelandic art scene and a frequent contributor to the Reykjavik Art Festival. In 2009 she led a group of 50 artists in an invasion of Iceland's cultural heritage at the exhibition/happening Orbis Terrae-ORA.

== Stage appearances ==
In summer 1994, she played Sheila in "The Musical Hair" in the Old Opera in Reykjavik. 1994-2004 Reykjavik's City Theater: Her first role as a young actress was the role of Disa, in an Icelandic play called "The Wish" ("Galdra - Loftur" Icelandic Folktale) by Jóhann Sigurjónsson. Pippi in "Pippi Longstocking" by Astrid Lindgren. Grusha in "The Caucasian Chalk Circle" by Bertolt Brecht directed by Stephan Metz, Rosa in Independent People by Halldor Laxness, Anna Karenina in "Anna Karenina" by Leo Tolstoy, Mrs. Vilhjálmsdóttir joined The Reykjavik's City Theatre again in 2001 for the roles: Mrs. Kapulet and Benvolio in Romeo and Juliet by William Shakespeare. Which was also played in winter 2003 in Young Vic Theatre London and winter 2003-2004 West End Theatre Playhouse London. 2004-2014 The Icelandic National Theater Elisabeth Foster Nietzsche (Nietzsche's sister) in "The Dynamite" by Birgir Sigurðsson, various roles in "Kitchen stories" by Svava Jakobsdóttir, also shown in The royal theatre of Copenhagen, Denmark. Young woman in "A Summer Day" by Jon Fosse. Anna in "Ivanov" by Anton Chekhov, with Director Benedict Andrews, Goneril, the oldest daughter in "King Lear" by William Shakespeare., Lady Macbeth in "Macbeth" by William Shakespeare, Les Miserables by Victor Hugo. Margrét Vilhjálmsdóttir returned to the Reykjavík's city theatre in 2016 for the role of Martha in "Who's afraid of Virginia Woolf” by Edward Albee and the 2018 production Trilogy "Heaven and Hell" by Jon Kalmann, Geirþrúður which got 11 nominations. Latest work 2021, a woman in Florian Zeller ́s (The Father) play “ In the Mid of The Storm “ in Hålogaland Theatre (The Arctic Theatre) North Norway.

== Filmography ==
- 2021: Trapped Tv series, Ása. dir. by Baltasar Kormákur.
- 2016: Grimmd (Cruelty), Edda.
- 2012: The Prophecy of the Seeress, short, Seeress.
- 2012: Lónbúinn, (Documentary short), Female Salmon Narrator (Icelandic) (voice)
- 2010: Mamma Gógó (The Director's Wife) dir. by Friðrik Þór Friðriksson, as the director's wife
- 2010: Kóngavegur 7 (King's Road 7) dir. by Valdís Óskarsdóttir, as Inga
- 2008: Brúðguminn (White Night Wedding) dir. by Baltasar Kormákur, as Anna
- 2008: Náttúra, Concert, (TV Special)
- 2007: Duggholufolkið dir. by Ari Kristinsson
- 2007: Misty Mountain (short film), as mother with child
- 2006: Blóðbönd (Thicker than Water), as Ásta
- 2003: Njálssaga TV movie
- 2002: Reykjavík Guesthouse - Rent a Bike as Telma
- 2002: Fálkar (Falcons) dir. by Friðrik Þór Friðriksson, as Dúa
- 2001: Í Faðmi Hafsins dir. by Lýður Árnason & Jóakim Reynisson, as Unnur
- 2001: Mávahlátur (The Seagull's Laughter) dir. by Ágúst Guðmundsson, as Freyja

=== Dubbing ===
- 1996: Babe(Film) family fantasy,
- 1998: The Little Mermaid as Ursula, the Sea Witch.
- 2007: The Simpsons Movie as Marge Simpson
- 2013: The Croods as Ugga

== Awards ==
- 2014: Griman, The Icelandic Theatre Awards.
- 2010: Griman, The Icelandic Awards.
- 2002: Shooting Stars Award
- 2001: Edda Award for Best Supporting Actress
- 1997: Stefaníustjakinn, Theatre Awards
