= White Whales (film) =

1987 Icelandic film by Friðrik Þór Friðriksson

White Whales aka Skytturnar
- Directed by: Friðrik Þór Friðriksson
- Written by: Friðrik Þór Friðriksson and Einar Kárason
- Produced by: Petter J. Borgli & Friðrik Þór Friðriksson
- Starring: Eggert Guðmundsson; Þórarinn Óskar Þórarinsson; Eggert Þorleifsson
- Music by: Hilmar Örn Hilmarsson, Sykurmolarnir, Bubbi Morthens & MX-21
- Distributed by: Icelandic Film Corporation
- Release date: 1987
- Running time: 80 minutes
- Country: Iceland
- Language: Icelandic

White Whales (orig: Skytturnar) the third film directed by Icelandic director Friðrik Þór Friðriksson in 1987. Starring Eggert Guðmundsson, Þórarinn Óskar Þórarinsson, and Eggert Þorleifsson, this film features Hilmar Örn Hilmarsson, Sykurmolarnir, Bubbi Morthens, and MX-21 on the soundtrack. The film was selected as the Icelandic entry for the Best Foreign Language Film at the 60th Academy Awards, but was not accepted as a nominee.

== Cast ==
- Eggert Guðmundsson
- Þórarinn Óskar Þórarinsson
- Harald G. Harladsson
- Karl Guðmundsson
- Auður Jónsdóttir
- Eggert Þorleifsson
- Helgi Björnsson
- Guðbjörg Thoroddsen
- Björn Karlsson
- Hrönn Steingrímsdóttir
- Þorsteinn Hannesson
- Baldvin Halldórsson
- Valdimar Flygenring
- Briet Héðinsdóttir

== Plot ==
The story starts when Grímur and Bubbi, two experienced whalers, decide to hitch-hike to Reykjavík at the end of the whaling season. They wonder about their future, having little prospects other than jobs like cleaning toilets or farm labour. In the big city, they drink too much and are thrown out of a fancy restaurant. They go to Grímur's grandmother, who also throws them out. Grímur tries to see his ex-girlfriend, and of course is ejected from there as well. After hopping from a billiards parlour to a strip club, they meet a women at a old-time dance club and go back to her flat, where they wear out their welcome again. They are arrested, but released soon after. They steal a car and crash into a sporting shop. Unfortunately, there are guns, and they shoot up the shop for fun. The first police on the scene call the Viking Squad for backup. A smoke grenade forces Bubbi out, and he is shot. Grímur sneaks away thanks to a passing street sweeper. But he ends up in a swimming pool, where he cannot escape.

== Credits ==
Director: Friðrik Þór Friðriksson.
Producer: Petter J. Borgli and Friðrik Þór Friðriksson.
Writers: Friðrik Þór Friðriksson and Einar Kárason.
Cinematography: Ari Kristinsson.
Edition: Tómas Gíslason and Jens Bidstrup.
Music performers: Hilmar Örn Hilmarsson, Sykurmolarnir, Bubbi Morthens & MX-21.
Sound recording: Þorbjörn Erlingsson and Þorvar Hafsteinsson.
Coincidental music: “Doubt”, “Atmosphere Pt. 1”, “Atmosphere Pt. 2”, “Tension Pt. 1”, “Tension Pt. 2”, “Tension Pt. 3”, “Sorrow”.
Other tracks: “Batman Theme”, “Car Rock”, “Sweet Jane”, “99th Floor” and “Synist”.
Note: all track names given in English.

== See also ==
- 1987 Skytturnar (Gramm), the soundtrack.
- List of submissions to the 60th Academy Awards for Best Foreign Language Film
- List of Icelandic submissions for the Academy Award for Best Foreign Language Film
