= An Instinct for Detection =

Studio album by Lionrock
- Released: 8 April 1996
- Studios: Planet Four; Prime Time; Out of the Blue Studios
- Genres: Big beat; trip hop; house; techno; electronica; dance-rock
- Length: 70:25
- Labels: Deconstruction; Time Bomb
- Producer: Justin Robertson

Lionrock chronology
An Instinct for Detection (1996)	City Delirious (1998)

An Instinct for Detection is the debut studio album by the British electronic act Lionrock, fronted by Mancunian producer Justin Robertson. Released in April 1996 in the United Kingdom by Deconstruction Records and in 1997 in the United States by Time Bomb Recordings, the album presents an eclectic sound, incorporating elements of house, techno, dub and rock, and was inspired by city life. The character of Sherlock Holmes was also an influence, with film dialogue samples dispersed throughout the record. Though largely instrumental, some tracks feature vocals from MC Buzz B.

The group promoted the album with an elaborate tour of the UK that, like the album, mixed live and electronic instrumentation. Fuelled by the singles "Packet of Peace", "Fire Up the Shoesaw" and "Straight at Yer Head", two of which became British hits, the album reached number 30 on the UK Albums Chart and received critical acclaim for its varied sound. The album has since become regarded as a cult classic.

== Background ==
Manchester-based producer Justin Robertson began Lionrock as a solo project in 1991 following his success as a disc jockey and remixer. After being sought down for remix work by artists such as Candy Flip, the Sugarcubes and the Shamen, Robertson became associated with the nascent Balearic style which combined house music with eclectic influences such as rock, garage and disco, and his popular Spice nightclub in Manchester was seen as an outgrowth of the Balearic scene. The producer's DJ work highlighted a 'freestyle' approach, playing music from numerous genres, including material ranging from Studio One reggae, John Barry soundtracks to Detroit techno. The first Lionrock single "Roots and Culture" was released in 1992 on Robertson's own Most Excellent label. The single, alongside further remix work, caught the attention of pop/dance label Deconstruction Records, who signed the act in 1993. That April, Lionrock released the EP Packet of Peace on the label, which became the act's first Top 40 hit in the UK Singles Chart, before beginning work on a debut album.

By the time An Instinct for Detection was conceived, Lionrock had grown from a Robertson solo project into a group, with keyboardists Mandy Wigby and Roger Lyons, bassist Paddy Steer and vocalist Mc Buzz B. On stage, they sporadically used live bass and guitar, with Robertson playing the latter. By touring Lionrock as a guitar-based rock band, Robertson allowed himself to "exorcise most of his Townsendian fantasies." The group recorded the album at Planet Four, Prime Time and Out of the Blue Studios, with Lyons engineering nine of the twelve tracks, the others being engineered by Aidan Love and Mark Stagg. Robertson and Lyons co-produced the album, the former contributing guitar and bass in addition to electronic instrumentation. Robertson commented: "Some people see using beats and live instruments as a big sacrilege. I don't give a fuck about those people, I hate orthodoxies." The group experimented during recording; Robertson explained: "When we're in the studio, it's usually like, 'Fuckin' hell, what's that noise? Do It Again'." He explained to Peter Shapiro of Spin: "There are a couple of sounds on the new LP that are just really bizarre. That's one of the good things about electronic music: It's just totally ludicrous what you end up doing."

== Composition ==
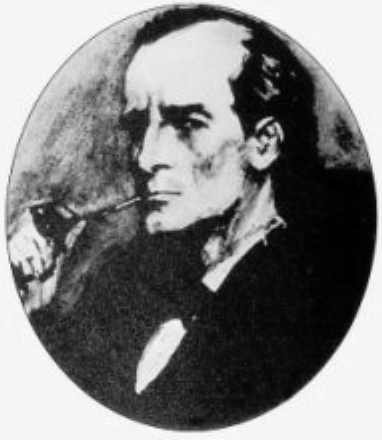
Film dialogue samples of Sherlock Holmes appear throughout the album.

An Instinct for Detection is an ambitious album that mixes house and hip hop breaks with instrumentation atypical to British dance music into propulsive but accessible arrangements. Pushing Robertson's genre fusions even further, the record is driven by heavy dance beats, dub bass lines, harsh techno synths and live instruments, utilising samples of artists such as Scott Walker and Nancy Sinatra. The album continues Lionrock's earlier experiments with reggae and dub, and was described by House: The Rough Guide as fusing techno with ragga and ska dynamics. Although the album is partly instrumental, MC Buzz B appears on several songs; his singing style was described by writer Tim DiGravina as "a cross between singing and syncopated speech," resulting in a precise enunciation which works as a counterpoint to the music's "aggressive, accessible throttle." Much of the album's guitar work is heavily treated.

Robertson said the album was about city life, citing living in Manchester as an inspiration. "Wilmslow Road" was named for a road he once lived on. He said: "It was all car alarms going off, and break-ins. It had a constant aura of petty theft. People'll say hello to you then rob your car." Though the album is frequently whimsical and playful, darker elements appear occasionally. Writer Ian Harrison described An Instinct for Detection as a "nut-job trip hop" album, whereas journalist Mark Jenkins called the album "a wide-ranging survey of contemporary U.K. art-disco." Robertson himself described it as "Coxsone Dodd meets Ennio Morricone". Jim Byers of The List said the album's exploration of varied genres was exemplary of "the concept of the dance/rock crossover".

Samples of Sherlock Holmes films, in particular dialogue of Holmes and his nemesis Professor Moriarty, are interspersed between songs throughout the record. Robertson said of Holmes: "He was a revolutionary character for his time. He flew in the face of contemporary ideas of behaviour. And he'd be banging up cocaine when he didn't have cases on." The inclusion of the Holmes samples was an attempt to create a "British equivalent" to the Beastie Boys' spoofing of American detective shows, as with the "Sabotage" video, and was partly inspired by the "Heinz Baked Beans ads" on the Who's The Who Sell Out (1967). Making note of the "[b]ags of cod Sherlock Homesian dialogue," writer Dave McDonigle described the record as "either trip-hop’s last gleaming or big beat's first concept album."

"Straight at Yer Head", flavoured by drum and bass, features MC Buzz B's accusatory "refugee-conscience" lyrics atop a mysterious Upsetters loop. The instrumental "Death Valley Clapperboard" features ominous movements, while "Fire Up the Shoesaw" is a chilled-out track with edits similar to the Art of Noise's "Close (to the Edit)", and a sample of an American asking "What is rock and roll?" "Depth" is a trip hop track, whereas "Snapshot on Pollard Street" features a jazzy shuffle, and "The Guide" features deep bass and wailing sirens, and has been compared to film noir music. "Number Nine" has been compared to The Prodigy and Drexciya, and "Bag of Biros" features klaxons and marimbas. Among the album's darker tracks, "Wilmslow Road" features a gloomy piano sound suggesting an "Ennio Morricone-like sense of displacement and dread," according to Harrison.

== Release ==
Deconstruction Records released An Instinct for Detection in April 1996 in the United Kingdom. Two singles from the album made the UK Singles Chart: "Straight At Yer Head" reached number 33 in April and "Fire Up the Shoesaw" reached 43 in July, with both songs remaining on the charts for two weeks. The album itself entered the UK Albums Chart on 20 April, peaking at number 30 and spending three weeks on the chart in total. McGoingle attributed some of its success to a remix of "Packet of Peace" featuring on the Chemical Brothers' Live at the Social Volume 1 gaining Lionrock new fans. Biographer Sean Cooper nonetheless felt that the record's "subtle abuse of pop (in the Beach Boys, not the Mariah Carey sense) was lost on many." Lionrock promoted An Instinct for Detection with a full-scale tour of the UK. The elaborate tour established guitars, percussion and a drum kit as part of Lionrock's live show. Robertson later reflected that during the recording and touring of the album, he felt he was losing sense of his place in dance music. He told Dylan Siegler of Billboard: "We were going too far down the band route. I was following that too much and forgetting what I was good at, what I liked, and that I was trying to get across this funky, descriptive music."

The album was released in the United States in 1997 by Time Bomb Recordings, having been in "licensing limbo" for a year. The American edition featured an extra CD, with nineteen tracks across the two discs. Journalist Mark Jenkins describes the bonus disc as "more emphatic" than the first disc, highlighting "Call a Cab" for alternating between funk rock verses and "abstracted dance-music interludes" and "Are You Willing to Testify?" for paying homage to proto-punk via its sample of "Kick out the Jams" by MC5." The bonus disc also features another version of "Fire Up the Shoesaw" featuring Mc Buzz B's vocals. "Fire Up the Shoesaw" found popularity on American modern rock stations, including WHFS in Washington, D.C., KROQ in Los Angeles and KITS in San Francisco.

== Critical reception ==
Professional ratings
Review scores
Source	Rating
AllMusic	4/5 stars
Muzik	5/5 stars
Select	4/5 stars
The Virgin Encyclopedia of Dance Music	4/5 stars
The Wee Rock Discography	8/10

An Instinct for Detection was warmly received by music critics. In a contemporary review, Ian Harrison of Select hailed the "good deal of twist," praising the eclecticism and describing it as "the best acid hip hop concept party album in the firmament", also feeling it established Robertson among "the premier league of punk-fixated dance music." Jim Carroll of The Irish Times also hailed the album's variety, writing that it shows MC buzz B in "biting lyrical form" and Lionrock's "sound system" to be in "storming mood," further highlighting "Fire Up the Shoesaw" and "Snapshot on Pollard Street" as "fired up assaults on the senses." In his review for Addicted to Noise, Gil Kaufman wrote that "Lionrock is like a movie that's all mesmerizing lights and strobe flashes, with the greatest soundtrack you've ever heard. All of it wired straight into your cortex."

Mark Jenkins of The Washington Post felt that the album frequently recalled the Art of Noise, "Britain's first great rejoinder to American hip-hop," updated via the addition of "some Tricky-style dub-derived spookiness and occasional movie-dialogue samples in the manner of Saint Etienne." Mike Schulman of Rhapsody said: "truly embodying the Balearic ideal, DJ Justin Robertson's Lionrock blend all manner of dancefloor styles, from loping House beats to propulsive Techno, hip-hop and down-tempo grooves. An undeniably funky undercurrent ties it all together, keeping the dancefloor humming." In a 1998 article for Spin, Julie Taraska nonetheless wrote that, upon the album's eventual release in the United States, "its Coldcut-style-break-beat-and-sample collages were 18 months past their sell-by date."

The album is considered by some to be a cult classic. Among retrospective reviews, Tim DiGravina of AllMusic described the record as excellent and overlooked. He hailed the inventive production and concluded that "An Instinct for Detection is a remarkable, wonderful album that shows consistent mastery of the pop and electronica genres. It's the perfect example of an album that masters dance and pop music, and it is perhaps the greatest lost classic of the '90s in any genre." In a guide to the big beat genre, Don McGonigle of Stylus Magazine wrote that the album was a "wonderfully eccentric" cult classic that showed Lionrock as an "inconsistently brilliant band." Martin Strong recommended the album to those new to Lionrock in his record guide The Wee Rock Discography, whereas in The Virgin Encyclopedia of Dance Music, Colin Larkin highlighted the reggae elements, MC Buzz B's vocals and the Sherlock Holmes samples. In his book Generation Ecstasy, Simon Reynolds highlighted the album as a key example of progressive house or album-oriented house.

== Track listing ==
All tracks are written by Justin Robertson, except where specified.

An Instinct for Detection
No.	Title	Writer(s)	Length
1.	"Morning Will Come When I'm Not Ready"		3:49
2.	"Straight at Yer Head"	J. Robertson, MC Buzz B	5:29
3.	"Peace Repackaged"	J. Robertson, MC Buzz B	4:16
4.	"Death Valley Clapperboard"		6:16
5.	"Fire Up the Shoesaw"		5:44
6.	"Don't Die Foolish"	J. Robertson, MC Buzz B	8:20
7.	"Depth"		4:43
8.	"Snapshot on Pollard Street"		5:28
9.	"Guide"	J. Robertson, MC Buzz B	6:52
10.	"Number Nine"		4:49
11.	"Bag of Biros"		6:57
12.	"Wilmslow Road"		7:34

American bonus disc
No.	Title	Writer(s)	Length
1.	"Fire Up the Shoesaw" (vocal mix)	J. Robertson, MC Buzz B	3:58
2.	"Packet of Peace" (Chemical Brothers mix)	J. Robertson, MC Buzz B	7:13
3.	"Packet of Peace" (Prankster Sound System mix)	J. Robertson, MC Buzz B	6:51
4.	"Straight at Yer Head" (An Instinct For Version)	J. Robertson, MC Buzz B	5:36
5.	"Are You Willing to Testify?"		6:53
6.	"Sun Up in the Centre"		5:18
7.	"Call a Cab"	J. Robertson, MC Buzz B	3:56

== Personnel ==
- Justin Robertson – writing, production, guitar, bass, keyboards, other ("bits & pieces")
- Roger Lyons – co-production, engineering (tracks 1–5, 7–8, 10–12), synthesizer (ARP), bass, keyboards, other ("sonic trickery")
- MC Buzz B – vocals, writing (tracks 2, 3, 6, 9)
- Aidan Love – engineering (track 1)
- Mark Stagg – engineering (tracks 6, 9)
- Dave Jukes – illustration
- Clive Durrant – illustration (Lionrock logo)
- Phil Knott – photography

== Singles ==
UK

Year	Single	Chart	Position
1993	"Packet Of Peace"	UK Singles Chart	32
1996	"Straight At Yer Head"	UK Singles Chart	33
1996	"Fire Up The Shoesaw"	UK Singles Chart	43

US

Year	Single	Chart	Position
1997	"Fire Up The Shoesaw"	Alternative (Radio and Records)	47
