= Angels of the Universe =

2000 Icelandic film by Friðrik Þór Friðriksson

- Directed by: Friðrik Þór Friðriksson
- Written by: Einar Már Guðmundsson
- Produced by: Friðrik Þór Friðriksson
- Starring: Ingvar Eggert Sigurðsson; Baltasar Kormákur; Björn Jörundur Friðbjörnsson; Hilmir Snær Guðnason; Margrét Helga Jóhannsdóttir; Theódór Júlíusson
- Cinematography: Harald Gunnar Paalgard
- Edited by: Skule Eriksen; Sigvaldi J. Kárason
- Music by: Hilmar Örn Hilmarsson
- Production companies: Icelandic Film Corp; Zentropa
- Release date: 1 January 2000
- Running time: 100 minutes
- Country: Iceland
- Language: Icelandic

Angels of the Universe (Icelandic: Englar alheimsins is a 2000 Icelandic film directed and produced by Friðrik Þór Friðriksson. The leading role is played by Ingvar E. Sigurðsson, who was nominated for the European Film Awards for best acting. The story is based on Einar Már Guðmundsson's 1995 novel of the same name, a semi-fictional story about Einar's brother Pálmi Örn Guðmundsson (named Páll in the book and movie). Much of the book is true; for example, Pálmi was mentally ill and painted as a hobby.

== Plot ==
Englar Alheimsins is the story of an Icelandic man, Páll (Ingvar Eggert Sigurðsson), who slowly descends into madness and depression after his girlfriend leaves him. His parents decide to send him to a mental hospital, where he meets Óli (Baltasar Kormákur), who believes he's the songwriter for The Beatles, Viktor (Björn Jörundur Friðbjörnsson), who signs cheques with the signature of Adolf Hitler, and other special characters. The movie depicts his struggle, both in and out of the mental hospital.

== Soundtrack ==
The movie soundtrack features the compositions of Hilmar Örn Hilmarsson, as well as two songs of the popular band Sigur Rós: "Bíum Bíum Bambaló" and "Dánarfregnir Og Jarðarfarir". The film also includes several American rock songs, though they are not present on the soundtrack CD release.

== Reception ==
The film opened at number one at the Icelandic box office with a gross of $57,163 in its opening weekend, the first Icelandic film to open at number one since Friðriksson's 1996 film, Devil's Island.

== Awards and nominations ==
The film won the following awards:

- Edda Awards (February 2000)
  - Best Film
  - Actor of the Year (Ingvar Eggert Sigurðsson)
  - Supporting Actor of the Year (Björn Jörundur Friðbjörnsson)
  - Supporting Actress of the Year (Margrét Helga Jóhannsdóttir)
  - Director of the Year (Friðrik Þór Friðriksson)
  - Professional Category: Music (Sigur Rós & Hilmar Örn Hilmarsson)
  - Professional Category: Sound (Kjartan Kjartansson)
- Karlovy Vary International Film Festival (July 2000)
  - Special Jury Mention (Friðrik Þór Friðriksson)
  - Nominated for the Crystal Globe
- Sea International Film Festival (September 2000)
  - Film and Literature Award (Friðrik Þór Friðriksson)
- European Film Awards (December 2000)
  - Audience Award for Best European Actor (Ingvar Eggert Sigurðsson)
  - Nominated for the European Film Award
- Santa Barbara International Film Festival (March 2001)
  - World Prism Award (Friðrik Þór Friðriksson)
- Festróia - Tróia International Film Festival (June 2001)
  - Silver Dolphin for Best Actor (Ingvar Eggert Sigurðsson)
  - OCIC Award - Special Mention (Friðrik Þór Friðriksson)
  - Nominated for the Golden Dolphin
