= Hilmir Snær Guðnason =

Icelandic actor

Hilmir Snær Guðnason is an Icelandic actor of screen and stage. In 2000 he was named as one of European films 'Shooting Stars' by European Film Promotion. He is best known for his roles in the films 101 Reykjavík (2000), Hafið (The Sea; 2002), Blueprint (2003), Guy X (2005), and A White, White Day (2019).

== Early life and education ==
Hilmir Snær Guðnason graduated from the Iceland Academy of the Arts in 1994.

== Career ==
Hilmir has played in a number of plays and musicals, including Hair and Rocky Horror Picture Show. His work with the National Theatre of Iceland includes: Midsummer Night's Dream, Macbeth, West Side Story, Hamlet, Who's Afraid of Virginia Woolf, and Ivanov.

He has had many film roles. In 1995, he played Guðmundur in the historical drama film Agnes. In 2000, he starred in 101 Reykjavík, directed by Baltasar Kormákur. He also had a role in the 2003 film Blueprint.

== Personal life ==
He was married to Bryndís Jónsdóttir and has two daughters born in 1995 and 2009.

== Awards and honours ==
Year	Award	Category	Nominated work	Result	Notes
2000	Berlin International Film Festival	Shooting Star		Won	
2000	Edda Awards	Best Actor	101 Reykjavík	Nominated	
2001	Edda Awards	Best Actor in a Supporting Role	Seagull's Laughter	Won	
2002	Edda Awards	Best Actor	The Sea	Nominated	
2003	Gríma Awards	Best Actor	Veislan	Won	
2008	Edda Awards	Best Actor	White Night Wedding	Won	
2010	Gríma Awards	Best Actor	Ég er mín eigin Kona	Won	
2010	Gríma Awards	Best Director	Fjölskyldan	Won	
2014	Gríma Awards	Best Actor	Eldraunin		

== Filmography ==
=== Film ===
Year	Film	Role	Notes
1995	Agnes	Guðmundur	
1995	Pocahontas	John Smith	Icelandic Voice (Speaking part only)
1996	The Hunchback of Notre Dame	Phoebus	Icelandic Voice
1997	13th Rider	Bjarni	TV movie
1997	Lady and the Tramp	The Tramp	Icelandic Voice
1998	Mulan	Captain Li Shang	Icelandic Voice (Speaking part only)
1998	Cinderella	Gus	Icelandic Voice
1999	Myrkrahöfðinginn	Reverend Jón Magnússon	
1999	A Bug's Life	Hopper	Icelandic Voice
2000	Englar Alheimsins	Pétur	
2000	101 Reykjavík	Hlynur Björn Hafsteinsson	
2001	Mávahlátur	Magnús	
2001	Sleeping Beauty	Philip	Icelandic Voice (Speaking part only)
2001	Lady and the Tramp II: Scamp's Adventure	The Tramp	Icelandic Voice
2002	Reykjavik Guesthouse: Rent a Bike	Jóhann Jóhannsson	
2002	Hafið	Ágúst	
2003	Njálssaga	Gunnar	TV movie
2003	Blueprint	Greg	as Hilmir Snaer Gudnason
2004	Peas at 5:30	Jakob Magnusson	
2005	Guy X	Petri	as Hilmir Snær Gudnason
2006	Blóðbönd	Péturs Golfmate	
2006	Köld Slóð	Kjartan	
2007	Cinderella III: A Twist in Time	Gus	Icelandic Voice
2007	Veðramót		
2008	Brúðguminn	Jón	
2008	Stóra Planið	Priest	
2009	Circledrawers	Oleg	TV movie
2010	Mamma Gógó	The Director	
2011	Rokland	Árni Valur	
2011	Okkar eigin Osló	Pálmi	
2011	Kurteist fólk	Hrafnkell	
2011	Cars 2	Francesco Bernoulli	Icelandic Voice
2013	Falskur Fugl	Drunk Man	
2014	The Biggest Rescue	Eyjólfur	
2014	Borgríki II: Blóð Hraustra Manna	Ívar	
2015	South of Hope Street	Tom	
2019	A White, White Day	Olgeir	
2020	The Last Fishing Trip (Síðasta veiðiferðin)	Jónsi	
2021	Lamb	Ingvar	
2022	The Very Last Fishing Trip (Allra síðasta veiðiferðin)	Jónsi	
2023	Wild Game		

=== Television ===
Year	Work	Role	Notes
1997	Fóstbræður	Various	
2005	Allir litir hafsins eru kaldir	Ari Jónsson	TV mini-series
2007	Áramótaskaupið		
2008	Mannaveiðar		
2008	Dagvaktin	Brynjólfur Gunnar	Episode "1.8"
