= Falcons (film) =

2002 film by Friðrik Þór Friðriksson

- Directed by: Friðrik Þór Friðriksson
- Written by: Friðrik Þór Friðriksson; Einar Kárason
- Produced by: Friðrik Þór Friðriksson; Anna María Karlsdóttir; Peter Rommel; Egil Ödegaard; Mike Downey; Samantha Taylor
- Starring: Keith Carradine; Margrét Vilhjálmsdóttir; Ingvar E. Sigurðsson
- Music by: Hilmar Örn Hilmarsson
- Distributed by: Icelandic Film Corporation
- Release date: 27 September 2002
- Running time: 95 minutes
- Languages: English; Icelandic

Falcons (Icelandic: Fálkar), is the seventh film directed by Friðrik Þór Friðriksson. This film, released in 2002, is mostly in the English language. It is not to be confused with another Icelandic film The Falcons (Víti í Vestmannaeyjum) from 2018.

== Plot ==
It is the story of an ex-convict, Simon (Keith Carradine), who after returning to Iceland where his mother was born, to visit relatives, looks for the loneliest place in the world to commit suicide. In a small village he meets Dúa (Margrét Vilhjálmsdóttir), an Icelandic young lady, who he finds to be an interesting, rather strange woman. Dúa has a caged falcon that she hopes to tame, but they get into trouble as it is illegal to possess this kind of animal in captivity.

Simon and Dua form a relationship based on Simon's belief that she is his illegitimate daughter. Surrounded by tension between them, Simon serves as a protective figure to Dúa, who keeps him from committing suicide.

The couple escape to Hamburg, Germany, to start all over again. The protagonists' behaviours are opposite to each other: Simon is down to earth and finds himself awkward by Dúa's eccentric beliefs in astrology, who considers Simon as a typical Scorpio and thus avoids deepening into a more serious relationship, partly because of the feeling of his paternity.

Dúa's falcon, that she nourished and protected when her uncle found it with a broken wing, has a high value to her, as she considers it last remnant of the beloved life in Iceland. The falcon travels with them on their escape and has a high monetary value. Later, as Dúa wasted their money, Simon tries to sell the falcon in order to cover their expenditure, but he is cheated by some crooked Germans and the falcon is stolen.

Finding a gun in a local bar, Simon confronts the men who cheated him, shooting them both and injuring himself in the process. Meanwhile, Dúa finds Simon's tape recorder, discerning he believes her to be his daughter. Simon returns to return Dúa the bird but collapses from his injuries in the street, Dúa reassures him that he was a good man and potential father as he dies. Dúa releases the falcon.

== Cast ==
- Keith Carradine as Simon
- Margrét Vilhjálmsdóttir as Dúa
- Ingvar E. Sigurðsson as Jóhann
- Magnús Ólafsson as Lobbi
- Margrét Ólafsdóttir as Auntie
- Friðrik Friðriksson as Young Policeman
- Axel Prahl as Car Rental Dealer
- Marisa Calcagno as Sabine
- Margrét Helga Jóhannsdóttir as Barmaid
- Ramin Yazdani as "Scarface"
- Geo von Krogh Salvation Army Host
- Hark Bohm as A Man of The World
- Ragnheidur Steindórsdóttir as Nurse
- Guðmundur Ólafsson as Doctor
- Pétur Ólafsson as Uncle Tóti
- Theódór Júlíusson as Bus Driver
- Randver Thorláksson as Customs Officer
- Zack-Volker Michalowski as Antique Dealer
- Jóhanna Vigdís Hjaltadóttir as TV Reporter I
- Ómar Ragnarsson as TV Reporter II
- Örlygur Kristfinnsson as Gallery Owner
- Darren Forman as American I
- Glenn Robert Hodge as American II
- Rafi Guessous as Doorman
- Bernd Gajkowski as Lübeck Bartender
- Frank Wieczorek as Sad Looking Man
- Werner Karle Jung as Shady Looking Man

== Music ==
The soundtrack was released as a separate CD titled Fálkar. The music composition was mainly by Hilmar Örn Hilmarsson and several important artists who set up a proper atmosphere to the film's plot.
