= Birthday (The Sugarcubes song) =

1987 single by The Sugarcubes

Single by the Sugarcubes

from the album Life's Too Good
- B-side: "Ammæli"
- Released: August 1987
- Genre: Alternative rock; dream pop; post-punk
- Length: 3:58
- Label: One Little Indian
- Songwriter: The Sugarcubes
- Producers: Ray Shulman; Derek Birkett

The Sugarcubes singles chronology
"Luftguitar" (1987)	"Birthday" (1987)	"Coldsweat" (1988)

"Birthday" is a song written and recorded by Icelandic alternative rock band the Sugarcubes. It was released as a single in 1987, and included in their 1988 debut album Life's Too Good. It was their first international single and the first single released from the album. The Icelandic version, "Ammæli", was released on the Iceland-only single "Einn Mol'á Mann" the previous year, and it was included as the B-side on the international single and on the frontwoman Björk's box set Family Tree (2002).

After "Birthday" became the single of the week in Melody Maker magazine and NME in August 1987, and was selected as number one in John Peel's Festive Fifty list, the band attained worldwide recognition and success. In the United Kingdom, the song was the group's first chart entry at number 65 and also reached number two on the country's indie charts. In the US it was ranked at number 15 on The Village Voice's "Pazz & Jop" critics' annual year-end poll to find the best music of 1988. The Sugarcubes performed the song, along with "Motorcrash" on Saturday Night Live during the 15 October 1988 episode, which was hosted by Matthew Broderick.

== Accolades ==
Publication	Country	Accolade	Year	Rank
NME	United Kingdom	NME Rock Years, Single of the Year 1963-99	2000	*
NME	United Kingdom	The 100 Best Songs of the 1980s	2012	28
NME	United Kingdom	The 500 Greatest Songs of All Time	2014	224
NME	United Kingdom	The Top 100 Singles of All Time	2002	89
Mojo	United Kingdom	80 from the 80s: Our Fave 45s for Each Year, 1980-1989	2007	2
Q	United Kingdom	The 1010 Songs You Must Own	2004	*
Q	United Kingdom	The Ultimate Music Collection	2005	*
Uncut	United Kingdom	The 100 Greatest Singles from the Post-Punk Era	2001	80
Gilles Verlant and Thomas Caussé	France	3000 Rock Classics	2013	*
Hervé Bourhis	France	The Juke Box Singles 1950-2012	2013	*
Les Inrockuptibles	France	1000 Indispensable Songs	2006	*
Les Inrockuptibles	France	1000 Necessary Songs	2015	*
Rolling Stone	United States	Singles of the Year	1988	9
Village Voice	United States	Singles of the Year	1988	15
Melody Maker	United Kingdom	Singles of the Year	1988	1
NME	United Kingdom	Singles of the Year	1988	8
Record Mirror	United Kingdom	Singles of the Year	1988	4
Rock de Lux	Spain	Singles of the Year	1988	9
Panorama	Norway	The 30 Best Singles of the Year 1970-98	1999	98
Rock de Lux	Spain	The Top 100 Songs from 1984-1993	1993	18
Bruce Pollock	United States	The 7,500 Most Important Songs of 1944-2000	2005	*
Pitchfork	United States	The Pitchfork 500	2008	*
Pitchfork	United States	The 200 Best Songs of the 1980s	2015	172
Shredding Paper	United States	The 50 Greatest Singles Ever	2002	40
Woxy.com	United States	Modern Rock 500 Songs of All Time	2009	135
Treble	The Top 200 Songs of the 80s	2011	185	
(*) designates lists that are unordered.

== Track listing ==
UK 7" vinyl

Side A

1. "Birthday" – 03:58

Side B

1. "Birthday" (Icelandic) – 03:57

UK 12" vinyl

Side A

1. "Birthday" – 03:58
2. "Birthday" (Icelandic) – 03:57

Side B

1. "Cat" (Icelandic) – 02:56

UK CD

1. "Birthday" – 3:58
2. "Motorcrash" – 02:23
3. "Cat" (Icelandic) – 02:56
4. "Birthday" (Icelandic) – 03:57

== Remixes ==
The song was remixed in 1988 by Jim and William Reid of the Jesus and Mary Chain and reissued as "Birthday (The Christmas Mixes)".

Remixes by Justin Robertson and Tommy D were produced in 1992 for the compilation It's-It, and were also released as a single.

== Covers ==
A cover of this song has been recorded by Chitose Hajime in 2001. It has also been covered by the Mars Volta in 2008. Jackie Oates also recorded this song on her 2009 album Hyperboreans (One Little Indian). M. Ward released a cover of this song in 2021.

== Charts ==
Chart	Peak position
New Zealand (Official New Zealand Music Chart)	41
UK Singles (OCC)	65
UK Dance Singles (Music Week)	34
UK Independent Singles	1
