= Kristbjörg Kjeld =

Icelandic actress (born 1935)

- Born: 18 June 1935 (age 90); Reykjavík, Iceland
- Occupation: Actress
- Years active: 1962–present

Kristbjörg Kjeld (born 18 June 1935) is an Icelandic actress. She has appeared in more than thirty films since 1962. She won the Edda Award for Best Leading Actress twice: In 2010 for her performance in Mamma Gógó, and in 2025 for her performance in Driving Mum.

== Selected filmography ==
Year	Title	Role	Notes
1962	The Girl Gogo	Gógó	
1988	In the Shadow of the Raven		
1989	Under the Glacier		
2000	Fíaskó		
2001	The Seagull's Laughter	Amma	
2002	The Sea	Kristin	
2004	Cold Light		
2008	Country Wedding		
2010	Mamma Gógó	Mamma Gógó	2010 Edda Award for Best Leading Actress
2013	Of Horses and Men		
2015	Sparrows	Grandmother	
2021	Zack Snyder's Justice League	Old Icelandic Woman	Director's cut of 2017's Justice League
2022	Driving Mum	Mamma	2025 Edda Award for Best Leading Actress
