= Stick Around for Joy =

Studio album by the Sugarcubes
- Released: 10 February 1992
- Studios: Bearsville (Woodstock, New York); Summa (Los Angeles)
- Genres: Alternative rock; dance-pop
- Length: 37:24
- Labels: Elektra; One Little Indian
- Producer: Paul Fox

The Sugarcubes chronology
Here Today, Tomorrow Next Week! (1989)	Stick Around for Joy (1992)	It's-It (1992)

Singles from Stick Around for Joy
- 1. "Hit" Released: 30 December 1991; 2. "Walkabout" Released: March 1992; 3. "Vitamin" Released: August 1992

Professional ratings
Review scores
Source	Rating
AllMusic	3/5 stars
Calgary Herald	B−
The Encyclopedia of Popular Music	3/5 stars
Entertainment Weekly	B−
MusicHound Rock: The Essential Album Guide	4/5 stars
Orlando Sentinel	2/4 stars
The Rolling Stone Album Guide	3.5/5 stars
Spin	2/5 stars
Spin Alternative Record Guide	3/10
Sputnikmusic	4/5 stars

Stick Around for Joy is the third and final studio album by Icelandic alternative rock band the Sugarcubes. It was released on 10 February 1992 by One Little Indian and in the US on 18 February 1992 by Elektra Records. The album was supported by four singles: "Hit", which reached number one on the Modern Rock Tracks chart in the US and number 17 on the UK Singles Chart, "Walkabout", "Vitamin" and "Leash Called Love", which went to number one on the US Dance chart.

The album peaked at number 95 on the Billboard 200 and reached number 16 on the UK Albums Chart, marking the band's lowest charting positions on both charts.

== Production ==
The band recorded the album in the United States, with producer Paul Fox.

== Critical reception ==
Trouser Press wrote that "Björk's singing is shapely, passionate and willfully bizarre; she carries the album pretty much on her own." MusicHound Rock: The Essential Album Guide deemed Stick Around for Joy the band's "most accessible and, true to its name, happiest sounding album, packed end to end with lively and tuneful dance pop." The Rolling Stone Album Guide thought that "it's the churning interplay of guitarist Thor Eldon and the rhythm section that ultimately carries the album." The Orlando Sentinel wrote that "bassist Bragi Olafsson and drummer Siggi Baldursson don't do much to dispel the notion that funk just isn't a Nordic thing." The Spin Alternative Record Guide wrote that by Stick Around for Joy the Sugarcubes had "already degenerated into mind-numbing mediocrity."

== Music videos ==
- "Hit", directed by Óskar Jónasson. Another version was directed by Pedro Romhanyi
- "Walkabout", directed by Óskar Jónasson
- "Vitamin"

== Track listing ==
All tracks are written by the Sugarcubes.

Stick Around for Joy track listing
No.	Title	Length
1.	"Gold"	3:39
2.	"Hit"	3:56
3.	"Leash Called Love"	3:42
4.	"Lucky Night"	4:03
5.	"Happy Nurse"	3:36
6.	"I'm Hungry"	4:33
7.	"Walkabout"	3:48
8.	"Hetero Scum"	3:07
9.	"Vitamin"	3:40
10.	"Chihuahua"	3:29

== Personnel ==
The Sugarcubes

- The Sugarcubes – mixing, lyrics and music
- Björk Guðmundsdóttir – vocals
- Einar Örn Benediktsson – vocals, trumpet
- Þór Eldon Jónsson – guitar
- Margrét Örnólfsdóttir – keyboards
- Bragi Ólafsson – bass
- Sigtryggur Baldursson – Drums and percussion

Additional personnel

- John McGeoch – guitar (track 1)
- Paul Fox – producer, mixing
- Ed Thacker – engineer, mixing
- Chris Laidlow – assistant engineer
- Stephen Marcussen – mastering
- Me Company – cover design

== Charts ==
Chart performance for Stick Around for Joy
Chart (1992)	Peak position
Australian Albums (ARIA)	74
Canada Top Albums/CDs (RPM)	76
Dutch Albums (Album Top 100)	71
German Albums (Offizielle Top 100)	58
Swedish Albums (Sverigetopplistan)	29
UK Albums (Official Charts)	16
US Billboard 200	95

2022 chart performance for Stick Around for Joy
Chart (2022)	Peak position
Scottish Albums (Official Charts)	90
UK Independent Albums (Official Charts)	31
