= White Night Wedding =

2008 Icelandic film by Baltasar Kormákur

- Directed by: Baltasar Kormákur
- Written by: Screenplay: Baltasar Kormákur; Ólafur Egilsson
- Produced by: Agnes Johansen; Baltasar Kormákur; Kim Magnusson; Lilja Pálmadóttir
- Starring: Hilmir Snær Guðnason; Margrét Vilhjálmsdóttir; Laufey Elíasdóttir; Þröstur Leó Gunnarsson; Jóhann Sigurðsson; Ólafía Hrönn Jónsdóttir; Ólafur Darri Ólafsson; Ilmur Kristjánsdóttir; Ólafur Egilsson; Karl Guðmundsson
- Cinematography: Bergsteinn Björgúlfsson
- Edited by: Elísabet Ronaldsdóttir
- Music by: Sigurður Bjóla; Jón Ólafsson
- Release date: 18 January 2008
- Running time: 96 minutes
- Country: Iceland
- Language: Icelandic

White Night Wedding (Icelandic: Brúðguminn) is a 2008 Icelandic film directed by Baltasar Kormákur. The bittersweet comedy, about the never-ending search for love and happiness, takes place in Flatey, Breiðafjörður, western Iceland. The film is loosely based on the play Ivanov by Anton Chekhov.

== Plot ==
The film opens with a wedding rehearsal at a small church in an isolated barren landscape. At the altar groom-to-be Jón, a middle-aged literature professor, is repeatedly interrupted by the ringing of his cell phone, much to the minister's annoyance. The present narrative alternates with flashbacks that depict the disintegration of Jón's first marriage to sensitive artist Anna. Jón's new bride-to-be, Thóra, is a former student half his age, which triggers disapproval by some, including his future in-laws. As preparations for the wedding unfold during the "white nights" (the shortest nights of the year, when it is never fully dark), the reason for Jón's increasing reluctance to marry is revealed: he and Anna visited the same spot a year earlier, and she died in an accident after she found Jón and Thóra making love. The marriage finally takes place, and Jón and Thóra settle down to a life very much like the one he had with Anna.

== Cast ==
- Hilmir Snær Guðnason as Jón
- Margrét Vilhjálmsdóttir as Anna
- Laufey Elíasdóttir as Thóra
- Þröstur Leó Gunnarsson as Börkur
- Jóhann Sigurðsson as Lárus
- Ólafía Hrönn Jónsdóttir as Sísí
- Ólafur Darri Ólafsson as Sjonni
- Ilmur Kristjánsdóttir as Matthildur
- Ólafur Egill Egilsson as Ólafur the elder

== Critical reception ==
White Night Wedding was nominated for the 2008 Nordic Council Film Prize and it was selected as the Icelandic entry for the Best Foreign Language Film at the 81st Academy Awards. It received seven Edda Awards in 2008:

- Best film
- Best actor
- Best supporting actor (Þröstur Leó Gunnarsson)
- Best supporting actress (Ólafía Hrönn Jónsdóttir)
- Best cinematographer: Bergsteinn Björgúlfsson
- Best costumes: Helga I. Stefánsdáttir
- Best set design: Grétar Reynísson and Atli Geir Grétarsson
