= Hit (The Sugarcubes song) =

1991 single by the Sugarcubes

Single by the Sugarcubes

from the album Stick Around for Joy
- B-side: "Theft"; "Chihuahua"
- Released: 30 December 1991
- Studio: Bearsville (Bearsville, New York)
- Length: 3:55
- Label: Elektra; One Little Indian
- Songwriter: The Sugarcubes
- Producer: Paul Fox

The Sugarcubes singles chronology
"Planet" (1990)	"Hit" (1991)	"Walkabout" (1992)

"Hit" is a song written and performed by Icelandic alternative rock band the Sugarcubes. It was released on 30 December 1991 by Elektra and One Little Indian as the lead single from their third and final studio album, Stick Around for Joy (1992). The song, produced by Paul Fox, became the band's most successful single, reaching number one on the US Billboard Modern Rock Tracks chart and number 17 on the UK Singles Chart. The accompanying music video was directed by Óskar Jónasson.

== Track listings ==
UK 7-inch vinyl

Side A

1. "Hit" – 3:57

Side B

1. "Theft" – 3:50

UK 12-inch vinyl

Side A

1. "Hit" – 3:57
2. "Theft" – 3:50

Side B

1. "Hit" (instrumental) – 3:50
2. "Leash Called Love" – 3:42

UK CD1

1. "Hit" – 3:57
2. "Theft" – 3:50
3. "Hit" (instrumental) – 3:57
4. "Chihuahua" (instrumental) – 3:32

== Personnel ==
Personnel are adapted from the liner notes of "Hit".

- The Sugarcubes – composition, mixing
- Paul Fox – production, mixing
- Ed Thacker – engineering, mixing
- Chris Laidlaw – engineering assistance
- Scott Blockland – engineering assistance
- Me Company – artwork

== Charts ==
=== Weekly charts ===
Chart (1992)	Peak position
Australia (ARIA)	76
Europe (Eurochart Hot 100)	66
Ireland (IRMA)	18
Sweden (Sverigetopplistan)	28
UK Singles (Official Charts)	17
UK Airplay (Music Week)	20
UK Indie (Music Week)	2
US Modern Rock Tracks (Billboard)	1

=== Year-end charts ===
Chart (1992)	Position
US Modern Rock Tracks (Billboard)	6

== Covers ==
The track was covered by English indie rock band Carter the Unstoppable Sex Machine (also known as "Carter USM") in 1993 as a B-side to their single "Lean On Me I Won't Fall Over" off their fourth album, Post Historic Monsters.

Diana Vickers also covered the track for her 2010 album, Songs from the Tainted Cherry Tree.
