= Íslenskir kóngar =

2012 novel by Einar Már Guðmundsson

First edition cover (publ. Mál og menning)

The fictional Knudsen dynasty of Íslenskir kóngar

Íslenskir kóngar ('Icelandic Kings') is a 2012 novel by Einar Már Guðmundsson, published by Mál og Menning, in Reykjavík.

== Summary ==
The novel is a satire of the ups and downs of the petty aristocracies of rural twentieth-century Iceland, depicting the fortunes of the imaginary Knudsen dynasty in the fictional fishing town of Tangavík, supposedly situated on the south coast of Iceland, near the Vestmannaeyjar. The dynasty's intertwined relationships with the right-wing Independence Party (usually referred to simply as 'The Party'), its widespread alcoholism, and the criminal activities it undertakes under the Party's shelter, are key themes. The novel involves a large cast, most of whom are represented in the family tree above. However, it focuses on the charismatic Arnfinnur Knudsen, born in 1930 at the beginning of the Great Depression, and dying on 6 October 2008, the day of Geir Haarde's infamous 'Guð blessi Ísland' speech, which marked the beginning of the 2008–2011 Icelandic financial crisis. The story is narrated by an ex-student of Arnfinnur's who despite his own left-wing convictions provides an adulatory account of his former mentor. The tone is one of somewhat rambling reminiscence, with repetition, poorly explained family relationships, and anecdotes all important features of the style.

== Translations ==
- Islandske konger, trans. by Erik Skyum-Nielsen (København: Lindhardt og Ringhof, 2013) ISBN 9788711385777; 2nd edn 2016, ISBN 9788711534694; 9788711485828 [Danish]
- Isländische Könige, trans. by Betty Wahl (München: btb, 2016), ISBN 9783442757022 [German]
- Kungar av Island, trans. by Inge Knutsson (Stockholm: Natur & Kultur, 2015), ISBN 9789127137493 [Swedish]
