= Hundadagar =

2015 novel by Einar Már Guðmundsson

First edition

Hundadagar ('Dog-Days') is a 2015 novel by Einar Már Guðmundsson, published in Reykjavík by Mál og menning. It won the 2015 Íslensku bókmenntaverðlaunin in the literature category. It is set between the 1720s and the 1820s and prominently features the English collector of (inter alia) Icelandic manuscripts Joseph Banks.

== Translations ==
- Hundedage, trans. by Erik Skyum-Nielsen (København: Lindhardt og Ringhof, 2015), ISBN 9788711448403 [2nd edn 2016, ISBN 9788711537121; 9788711485828]
