= Here Today, Tomorrow Next Week! =

Studio album by the Sugarcubes
- Released: 20 September 1989
- Recorded: 1989
- Studio: Berry Street Studio, CBS Roof Top, Liquidator Studios, Orinoco, Strongroom Studios (London); Stúdíó Sýrland (Reykjavík)
- Genre: Alternative rock
- Length: 51:23
- Label: Elektra; One Little Indian
- Producer: The Sugarcubes; Derek Birkett

The Sugarcubes chronology
Life's Too Good (1988)	Here Today, Tomorrow Next Week! (1989)	Stick Around for Joy (1992)

Singles from Here Today, Tomorrow Next Week!
- 1. "Regina" Released: June 1989; 2. "Tidal Wave" Released: October 1989; 3. "Planet" Released: January 1990

Professional ratings
Review scores
Source	Rating
AllMusic	3/5 stars
Robert Christgau	B+
Hi-Fi News & Record Review	B:2
Rolling Stone	3/5 stars

Here Today, Tomorrow Next Week! is the second studio album by Icelandic alternative rock band the Sugarcubes, released on 20 September 1989 through Elektra Records. A version of the album sung in Icelandic titled Illur Arfur! (English: Bad Legacy!) was released as well, with the same English track listing, under the name of Sykurmolarnir (Sugarcubes in Icelandic). The album reached number 70 on the US Billboard 200, number 15 on the UK Albums Chart and number one on the UK Indie Albums chart. The album was not as well received by critics as their critically acclaimed debut album, Life's Too Good, and was criticized for Einar's greater vocal contribution.

The album spawned three singles: "Regina", which reached number two on the Billboard Modern Rock Tracks chart, "Tidal Wave" and "Planet". Music videos were released for all three singles, as well as "Eat the Menu".

The name of the album was inspired by Mr. Toad from the famous children's book The Wind in the Willows.

== Track listing ==
All tracks are written by the Sugarcubes.

No.	Title	Length
1.	"Tidal Wave"	2:55
2.	"Regina"	4:03
3.	"Speed Is the Key"	3:18
4.	"Dream TV"	3:12
5.	"Nail"	3:17
6.	"Pump"	4:24
7.	"Eat the Menu"	3:43
8.	"Bee"	2:26
9.	"Dear Plastic"	3:23
10.	"Shoot Him"	2:09
11.	"Water"	3:00
12.	"A Day Called Zero"	2:38
13.	"Planet"	3:22
Total length:		41:50

Bonus tracks
No.	Title	Length
14.	"Hey"	3:19
15.	"Dark Disco 1"	2:59
16.	"Hot Meat"	3:15
Total length:		51:23

Notes

- The bonus tracks do not appear on the LP edition.
- "Hot Meat" is a reworking of "Coldsweat" from the band's debut album, Life's Too Good, as well as the B-side of "Regina".

== Personnel ==
The Sugarcubes

- Björk Guðmundsdóttir – vocals
- Einar Örn Benediktsson – vocals, trumpet
- Þór Eldon Jónsson – guitar
- Margrét Örnólfsdóttir – keyboards
- Bragi Ólafsson – bass
- Sigtryggur Baldursson – drums and percussion

Additional personnel

- Baritone Saxophone (track 1) – Nigel Hitchcock
- Brass, Arranged By (track 1) – Ólafur Gaukur
- Tenor saxophone (track 1) – Gary Barnacle
- Trombone (track 1) – Pete Thomas
- Trombone bass (track 1) – Kenny Hamilton
- Trumpet (track 1) – John Thirkell, Stewart Brooks
- Cello (track 13) – Anthony Pleeth, Ben Kennard, Martin Loveday, Paul Kegg
- Viola (track 13) – David Emanuel, Garfield Jackson, George Robertson, Levine Andrade
- Violin (track 13) – Barry Wilde, Ben Cruft, Bill Benham, David Woodcock, Elizabeth Edwards, Mark Berrow, Peter Oxer, Roger Garland, Wilfred Gibson
- Lead Violin (track 13) – Gavyn Wright
- Strings Conductor, Arranged By (track 13) – Chris Cameron
- Contractor (track 13) – Isobel Griffiths
- Strings recording (track 13) – Mike Ross-Trevor
- Mixing – Pétur Gíslason (tracks 1, 7, 8), Derek Birkett (tracks 2, 4–6, 9–13), Siggi Baldursson (track 3)
- Production – Derek Birkett, The Sugarcubes
- Recording – Brian Pugsley
- Additional recording – Brad Grisdale, Gail Lambourne, Gerard Johnson (track 1), Gordon Milne, Ian Horne, Julian Withers, Karen White, Phil Bodger, Will Gosling
- Technical assistance – Paul Ellis
- Publisher – Second Wind
- Artwork – Keli Kaldi, Óskar Storm
- Layout – Designland
- Outside photo – Aged Rings
- Inside photo – Andrew Catlin
- Sleeve design – Keli Kaldi and Óskar Strom

== Charts ==
Chart performance for Here Today, Tomorrow Next Week!
Chart (1989)	Peak position
Australian Albums (ARIA)	105
UK Albums Chart	15
UK Indie Albums Chart	1
US Billboard 200	70

2022 chart performance for Here Today, Tomorrow Next Week!
Chart (2022)	Peak position
Scottish Albums (OCC)	83
UK Independent Albums (OCC)	35
