= Mamma Gógó =

2010 film

- Film poster
- Directed by: Friðrik Þór Friðriksson
- Written by: Friðrik Þór Friðriksson
- Produced by: Friðrik Þór Friðriksson
- Starring: Kristbjörg Kjeld
- Cinematography: Ari Kristinsson
- Music by: Hilmar Örn Hilmarsson
- Release date: 1 January 2010
- Running time: 90 minutes
- Country: Iceland
- Language: Icelandic

Mamma Gógó is a 2010 Icelandic drama film directed by Friðrik Þór Friðriksson. The film was selected as the Icelandic entry for the Best Foreign Language Film at the 83rd Academy Awards, but did not make the final shortlist.

== Cast ==
- Kristbjörg Kjeld as Mamma Gógó
- Hilmir Snær Guðnason as The director
- Gunnar Eyjólfsson as Gógó's deceased husband
- Margrét Vilhjálmsdóttir as The director's wife
- Ólafía Hrönn Jónsdóttir as The director's sister 1
- Inga Maria Valdimarsdóttir as The director's sister 2
- Jóhann Sigurðarson as The bank manager
- Bjarni Ingvarsson as The Farmer

== See also ==
- List of submissions to the 83rd Academy Awards for Best Foreign Language Film
- List of Icelandic submissions for the Academy Award for Best Foreign Language Film
