= Our Own Oslo =

2011 film

- Directed by: Reynir Lyngdal
- Written by: Thorsteinn Gudmundsson
- Starring: Thorsteinn Gudmundsson
- Cinematography: Víðir Sigurðsson
- Release date: 4 March 2011
- Running time: 97 minutes
- Country: Iceland
- Language: Icelandic

Our Own Oslo (Icelandic: Okkar eigin Osló) is a 2011 Icelandic comedy film directed by Reynir Lyngdal.

== Plot ==
While on company business in Oslo, conservative fortyish engineer Harald literally bumps into Icelandic bank worker Vilborg and her drunk boss (also on business in the city) in the lobby of their hotel after his sales presentation in the hotel's conference room. Harald saves the ladies from getting kicked out of the hotel by intervening with the annoyed Norwegian hotel reception manager. After putting Vilborg's passed-out boss to bed, a task he is familiar with from having tended to his now-deceased alcoholic father, Harald experiences a magical night of sightseeing, dining, and romance with Vilborg.

Back at home in Reykjavik and wanting to build on their first night, Harald invites Vilborg out to breakfast. In the course of their early morning date, she is accused of embezzling bank funds by her now sober boss, has her car repossessed off the street in front of her, reveals to Harald she has a gambling addiction, and has an emotional breakdown during which she proposes to drown herself. Enter Harald to the rescue; after he has her over to his apartment to calm her down with hot chocolate, Harald invites Vilborg out to his summer cabin, after which the personal baggage of each grows. Harald has a needy developmentally disabled adult sister, Vilborg has an adolescent son whom she initially forgets to collect, and Harald is busy as the summer cabin association chair and sewer-line maintenance man. To further frustrate the opportunity for romance between the new couple, Vilborg's ex-husband Palmi appears at the summer cabin, and Harald's mom is being pursued by her long-time boyfriend. Following heavy drinking of Harald's liquor by Vilborg and her ex that leads to Vilborg's and Palmi's private reunion in a tent, the exact nature of which is unclear, the Vilborg/Harald romance appears dead.

After Vilborg takes her son, who has finally started to like Harald, and departs in a taxi, Vilborg and Harald each have flashbacks to their carefree special night in the Norwegian capital. Frustrated by the failure of the romance and by pent-up anger toward his deceased alcoholic father, Harald lights the summer cabin on fire to the neighbours' shock and amusement. As the cabin blazes, Vilborg arrives back at the scene desperate to find Harald whom she now realizes she loves and wants to pursue a relationship with.

== Cast ==
- Thorsteinn Gudmundsson as Harald
- Brynhildur Guðjónsdóttir as Vilborg
- Hilmir Snær Guðnason as Palmi
- Maria Heba Thorkelsdottir as Embla
- Thorhallur Sigurdsson as Havel

== Box office ==
Our Own Oslo was the highest grossing film for 2011 in Iceland theatres.
