= Angels of the Universe (novel) =

1995 novel by Einar Már Guðmundsson

- Author: Einar Már Guðmundsson
- Original title: Englar alheimsins
- Language: Iceland
- Published: 1995
- Publication place: Iceland
- Awards: Nordic Council's Literature Prize of 1995

Angels of the Universe (Icelandic: Englar alheimsins) is a 1993 novel by Icelandic author Einar Már Guðmundsson. It won the Nordic Council's Literature Prize in 1995.

In 2000, it was adapted into the feature film Angels of the Universe.
