= Movie Days =

- Directed by: Friðrik Þór Friðriksson
- Produced by: Friðrik Þór Friðriksson; Peter Rommel; Peter Aalbæk Jensen
- Starring: Örvar Jens Arnarson; Rúrik Haraldsson; Sigrún Hjálmtýsdóttir
- Music by: Hilmar Örn Hilmarsson
- Release date: 1994
- Running time: 82 minutes
- Country: Iceland
- Language: Icelandic

Movie Days (Icelandic: Bíódagar) is a 1994 Icelandic film directed by Friðrik Þór Friðriksson. The film was selected as the Icelandic entry for the Best Foreign Language Film at the 67th Academy Awards, but was not accepted as a nominee.

== See also ==
- List of submissions to the 67th Academy Awards for Best Foreign Language Film
- List of Icelandic submissions for the Academy Award for Best Foreign Language Film
