= Friðrik Þór Friðriksson =

Icelandic film director and producer

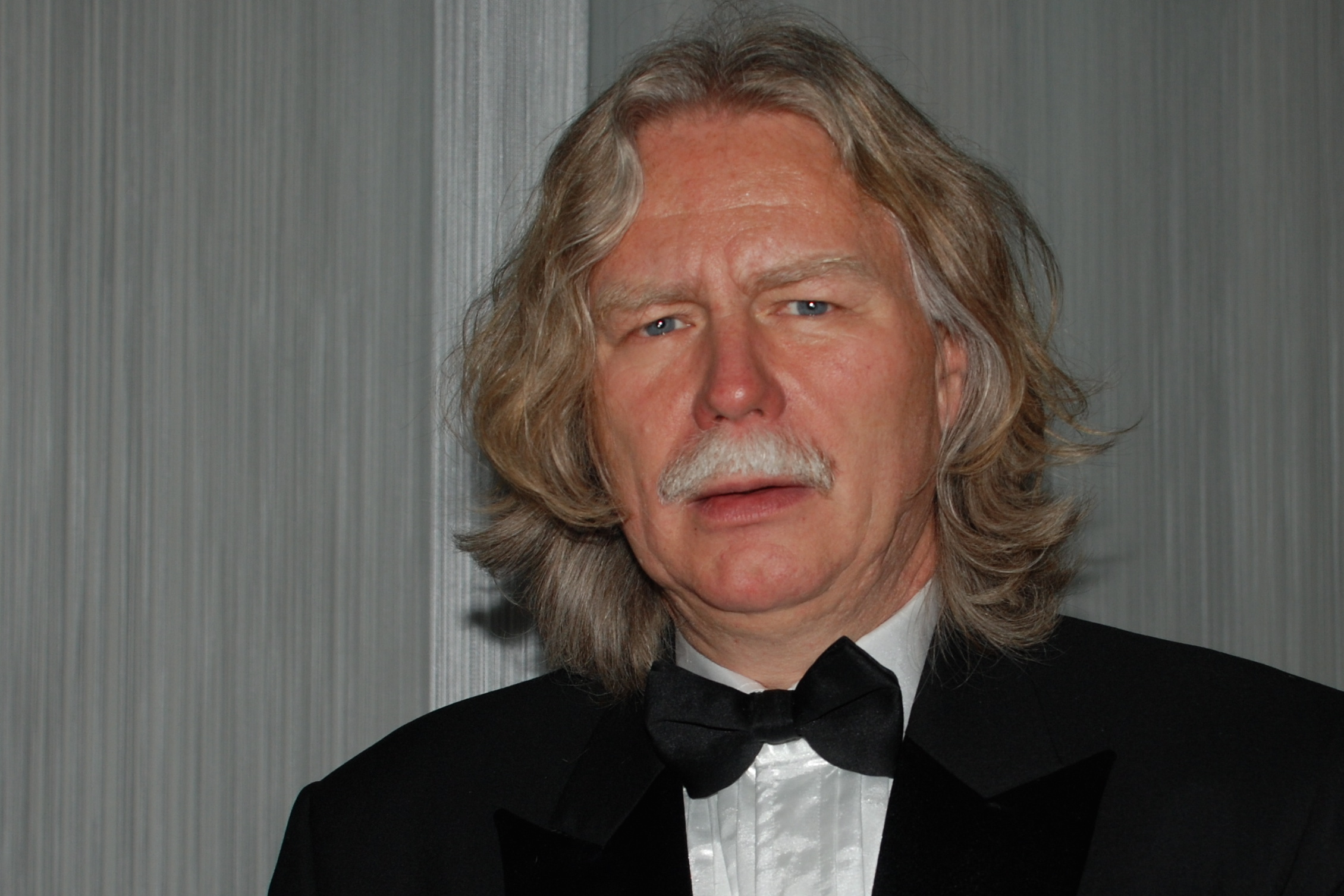
- Born: 12 May 1954 (age 72); Reykjavík, Iceland
- Other name: Frikki
- Occupations: Film director, screenwriter, producer and actor.
- Awards: Edda Award for Best Director

Friðrik Þór Friðriksson (born 12 May 1954; pronounced [ˈfrɪðrɪk ˈθouːr ˈfrɪðrɪxsɔn]), sometimes credited as Fridrik Thor Fridriksson, is an Icelandic film director and producer.

== Biography ==
Fridriksson started his film making career with experimental films and documentaries in the early 1980s. In 1987, he founded The Icelandic Film Corporation that became Iceland's most important film production company. The company produces his films and works with other Icelandic directors as well as producers. His international reputation led the company to build a network of internationally well-established co-production partner companies, including Lars von Trier's Zentropa and Francis Ford Coppola's American Zoetrope.

He made his debut as a film director with Skytturnar (White Whales) in 1987. His second feature Children of Nature (1991) was nominated for an Oscar as Best Foreign Language Film (it was also Iceland's first nomination in this category). Children of Nature took the Grand Prize at the 4th Yubari International Fantastic Film Festival in February 1993.

Friðrik also starred in Lars von Trier's 2006 comedy film The Boss of It All.

In 2010, he made a documentary A Mother's Courage: Talking Back to Autism and a feature film Mamma Gógó; both premiered at the Toronto International Film Festival.

A Mother's Courage: Talking Back to Autism was nominated for the Voice award in 2010.

In 2015, together with Bergur Bernburg, he co-directed Sjóndeildarhringur (Horizon), a documentary about Georg Guðni Hauksson, which premiered at Toronto International Film Festival.

In 2024 he participated in the 46th Moscow Film Festival in Russia.

== Style ==
He grew up in Iceland and was largely influenced by American films. Despite that, it was exposure to the work of Akira Kurosawa, John Ford and Nicholas Ray which proved crucial in his decision to become a filmmaker. He has worked with two of Iceland's most acclaimed novelists and script-writers. His work with Einar Már Guðmundsson includes Children Of Nature, Angels of the Universe, and Movie Days. His work with Einar Kárason includes White Whales, Devil's Island, and Falcons.

Friðriksson is noted for the strong visual style of his films, including stunning images. These films are both deeply personal and strongly rooted in the culture of Iceland, often depicting characters at the crossroads of tradition and modernity. They are said to combine a wry sense of humour with a genuine solidarity with the characters.

== Personal life ==
Friðriksson is interested in football and is a devoted fan of the Fram Reykjavík team.

== Filmography ==
Year	Title
1981	The Saga of Burnt Njál (Brennu-njálssaga)
1982	Rock in Reykjavik (Rokk í Reykjavík)
1985	The Ring Road (Hringurinn)
1987	White Whales (Skytturnar)
1991	Children of Nature (Börn náttúrunnar)
1994	Movie Days (Bíódagar)
1994	Cold Fever (Á köldum klaka)
1996	Devil's Island (Djöflaeyjan)
2000	Angels of the Universe (Englar alheimsins)
2002	On Top Down Under
2002	Falcons (Fálkar)
2004	Niceland (Population. 1.000.002)
2009	The Sunshine Boy (Sólskinsdrengurinn)
2011	Mamma Gógó
2011	Season of the Witch (Tími nornarinnar); TV miniseries
2002	Horizon (Sjóndeildarhringur)
