= The Seagull's Laughter =

2001 film by Ágúst Guðmundsson

- Directed by: Ágúst Guðmundsson
- Written by: Kristin Marja Baldursdóttir; Ágúst Guðmundsson
- Produced by: Kristín Atladóttir; Andy Paterson; Raphael Socha; Helgi Toftegard
- Cinematography: Peter Krause
- Edited by: Henrik D. Moll
- Production companies: Isfilm; Archer Street Productions; Hope & Glory Film Productions GmbH; Hope & Glory Pictures International; Hope & Glory Pictures
- Distributed by: Epix Media; Sam-Myndbönd; The Cinema Guild
- Release date: October 20, 2001 (Iceland)
- Countries: Iceland; Germany; United Kingdom

The Seagull's Laughter (Icelandic: Mávahlátur) is a 2001 Icelandic film directed by Ágúst Guðmundsson. It stars Ugla Egilsdóttir as Agga, an orphaned preteen distrusting of her cousin Freyja, played by Margrét Vilhjálmsdóttir, who turns heads on her return from America, no longer the chubby teen that the Icelandic townspeople remember.

Set around 1950, the story portrays a pivotal moment in Iceland’s recent history: newly independent, with the legacy of the Second World War still prominent, Iceland is modernising and internationalising. The film is set in Hafnarfjörður, now effectively a suburb of Reykjavík, then a fishing town outside it. It is a close adaptation of the novel Mávahlátur by Kristín Marja Baldursdóttir, published in 1995 by Mál og menning.

It was Iceland's submission to the 74th Academy Awards for the Academy Award for Best Foreign Language Film, but was not accepted as a nominee.

== Plot ==
The story is set around the 1950s, not very long after Iceland's independence from Denmark. The arrival of modernity in Iceland, including democracy, feminism, and new technologies and fashions, is an implicit theme throughout the text.

The narrative is presented from the perspective of Agga (played by Ugla Egilsdóttir), who during the three or so years covered by the story goes from being a preteen girl to being a young woman. The main agent in the story, however, is Agga's older step-cousin Freyja (played by Margrét Vilhjálmsdóttir). Freyja returns to Iceland from America after her American army officer husband died of a heart attack two months before. Freyja, who is dressed in American clothing, brought back 7 luggages of clothes with her from America, and amazes her Icelandic family - Agga's grandmother and her aunts Ninna and Dódó - with her clothes, perfumes, and her having a fridge in America. Agga becomes suspicious, suspecting that Freyja is an evil woman or indeed a witch, and should be sent back to America. However, no one believes her.

Regardless of her suspicion, Agga told Dísa (played by Bára Lyngdal Magnúsdóttir) about Freyja's return. Dísa was excited about the news, so she ran to where Freyja is staying to meet her. The family of girls then tried on Freyja's clothes from America, and held a mini fashion show inside their house.

Agga then decided to report her suspicion to the local policeman Magnús (played by Hilmir Snær Guðnason), telling him that Freyja is heartless and evil, and that she is a liar. Magnús did not take Agga seriously, laughed her accusations off, and sent her out of the police station. With no one on her side, Agga began to follow Freyja, hoping to find out more about her. Freyja was found frequently visiting the rocks near the sea, disappearing behind the rocks and only reappearing many hours later. As Agga found the rocks intimidating, she dared not follow Freyja behind the rocks, and therefore no one knows what Freyja does behind the rocks.

Agga realizes that Magnús doesn't take her seriously because she is dressed as a child, after some difficulties with the other women in the house she obtains a trench coat; dressed like an adult she returns to the station where Magnús finally hears her out.

== Cast ==
- Margrét Vilhjálmsdóttir as Freyja
- Ugla Egilsdóttir as Agga
- Heino Ferch as Björn Theodór
- Hilmir Snær Guðnason as Magnús
- Kristbjörg Kjeld as Amma
- Edda Björg Eyjólfsdóttir as Dódó
- Bára Lyngdal Magnúsdóttir as Dísa
- Eyvindur Erlendsson as Afi
- Guðlaug Elísabet Ólafsdóttir as Ninna
- Sigurveig Jónsdóttir as Kidda
- Diijá Mist Einarsdóttir as Emelía
- Halldóra Geirharðsdóttir as Birna
- Jónína Ólafsdóttir as Læknisfrúin
- Charlotte Bøving as Mette
- Benedikt Erlingsson as Hilli
- Arnar Jónsson as Syslumaður
- Anna Kristín Arngrímsdóttir as Syslumannsfrú
- Gunnar Hansson as Unnusti Dódóar
- Baldur Trausti Hreinsson as Gummi
- Guðmundur Ólafsson as Dr. Enok
- Theódór Júlíusson as Þórður Lögga
- Sigurður Skúlason as Jói Betu
- Gunnar Helgason as Gauji Sígrenjandi
- Halldór Magnússon as Tobbi Spritt
- Kjartan Ragnarsson as Prestur
- Jón Júlíusson as Póstur
- Valgeir Guðjónsson as Hijómsveitarstjóri
- Magnús Ragnarsson as Rödd Björns Theodórs
- Lísa Pálsdóttir as Konur Í Heimsókn

== See also ==
- Cinema of Iceland
- List of submissions to the 74th Academy Awards for Best Foreign Language Film
