= It's-It (album) =

Remix album by the Sugarcubes
- Released: 5 October 1992
- Recorded: 1987–1992
- Genre: House; techno; electronica
- Length: 73:27
- Label: Elektra
- Producer: The Sugarcubes; Mark Stagg; Derek Birkett

The Sugarcubes chronology
Stick Around for Joy (1992)	It's-It (1992)	The Great Crossover Potential (1998)

Singles from It's-It
- 1. "Leash Called Love" Released: 15 October 1992

Professional ratings
Review scores
Source	Rating
AllMusic	3/5 stars
Rolling Stone	3.5/5 stars

It's-It, released in October 1992, is a remix album by the Icelandic alternative rock band the Sugarcubes. After its release, the Sugarcubes disbanded and lead singer Björk went on to have a successful solo career. One single that was released from this compilation, the Tony Humphries remix of "Leash Called Love" reached number one on Billboard's Hot Dance Club Songs Chart in 1992.

A limited edition double-disc set was released in Britain but is now long out of print.

== Track listing ==
All tracks are written by The Sugarcubes.

No.	Title	Length
1.	"Birthday" (Justin Robertson 12" Mix)	7:32
2.	"Leash Called Love" (Tony Humphries Mix)	6:27
3.	"Blue Eyed Pop" (S1000 Mix)	6:39
4.	"Motorcrash" (Justin Robertson Mix)	6:49
5.	"Planet" (Graham Massey Planet Suite Pt. 2)	4:42
6.	"Gold" (Todd Terry Mix)	6:10
7.	"Water" (Bryan 'Chuck' New Mix)	4:13
8.	"Regina" (Sugarcubes Mix. Originally released as the Propeller Mix)	5:12
9.	"Mama" (Mark Saunders Mix)	5:09
10.	"Pump" (Marius de Vries Mix)	4:30
11.	"Hit" (Tony Humphries Sweet & Low Mix)	7:10
12.	"Birthday" (Tommy D Mix)	6:42
13.	"Coldsweat" (DB/BP Mix)	4:12
Total length:		73:27

Japanese edition
No.	Title	Length
14.	"Vitamin" (E Mix)	3:54
Total length:		76:81

Disc 2 (UK release only)
No.	Title	Length
1.	"Birthday" (Jim & William Reid Christmas Eve Mix. Originally released as "Christmas Eve")	4:31
2.	"Coldsweat" (DB/RS Mix)	3:42
3.	"Deus" (DB/RS Mix)	6:09
4.	"Regina" (Sugercubes Mix. Originally released as the Jet Mix)	4:29
5.	"Dream TV" (Todd Terry Mix)	3:11
6.	"A Day Called Zero" (Marius De Vries Mix)	3:47
7.	"Vitamin" (Youth’s Babylon’s Burning Mix)	7:35
8.	"Leash Called Love" (Tony Humphries Mo Nu Dub)	6:18
9.	"Hit" (Tony Humphries Papa Bear Mix)	5:32
10.	"Pump" (Marius De Vries Freestyle Mix)	4:27
11.	"Motorcrash" (Justin Robertson Dub 2)	5:25
Total length:		53:06
