= Eggert Guðmundsson =

Icelandic footballer (born 1964)

Personal information
- Date of birth: 6 April 1964 (age 62)
- Position: Goalkeeper

Youth career
- 1981: Halmstads BK

Senior career*
Years	Team	Apps	(Gls)
1982–1986	Halmstads BK	48	(0)
1987–1988	Trelleborgs FF	35	(0)
1989	Falkenbergs FF	26	(0)
1992–1993	BK Astrio	44	(0)
1995	Degerfors IF	0	(0)
1997	Halmstads BK	0	(0)
Total		153	(0)

International career
1984	Iceland U21	1	(0)
1985	Iceland	1	(0)
- * Club domestic league appearances and goals

Eggert Guðmundsson (born 6 April 1964) is an Icelandic former football goalkeeper. He made his international debut with Iceland 1985 in the World Cup Qualification against Scotland. He played his entire professional football career in Sweden.
