= Thicker than Water (2006 film) =

2006 Icelandic film

- Icelandic: Blóðbönd
- Directed by: Árni Ásgeirsson
- Written by: Árni Ásgeirsson; Denijal Hasanovic; Jón Atli Jónason
- Produced by: Snorri Þórisson
- Starring: Hilmar Jonsson; Margrét Vilhjálmsdóttir; Laufey Elísasdóttir; Aaron Brink; Elma Lisa Gunnarsdottir
- Cinematography: Tuomo Hutri
- Edited by: Elísabet Ronaldsdóttir
- Music by: Jóhann Jóhannsson
- Production company: Pegasus Pictures
- Release date: 24 February 2006 (Iceland)
- Running time: 90 minutes
- Country: Iceland
- Language: Icelandic

Thicker than Water (original title: Blóðbönd []) is a 2006 Icelandic film about a man who finds out that his child is not actually his own.

== Cast ==
- Hilmar Jonsson as Pétur
- Margrét Vilhjálmsdóttir as Ásta
- Laufey Elísasdóttir as Anna
- Aaron Brink as Örn
- Elma Lisa Gunnarsdottir as Lilja
