= Einar Már Guðmundsson =

Icelandic author (born 1954)

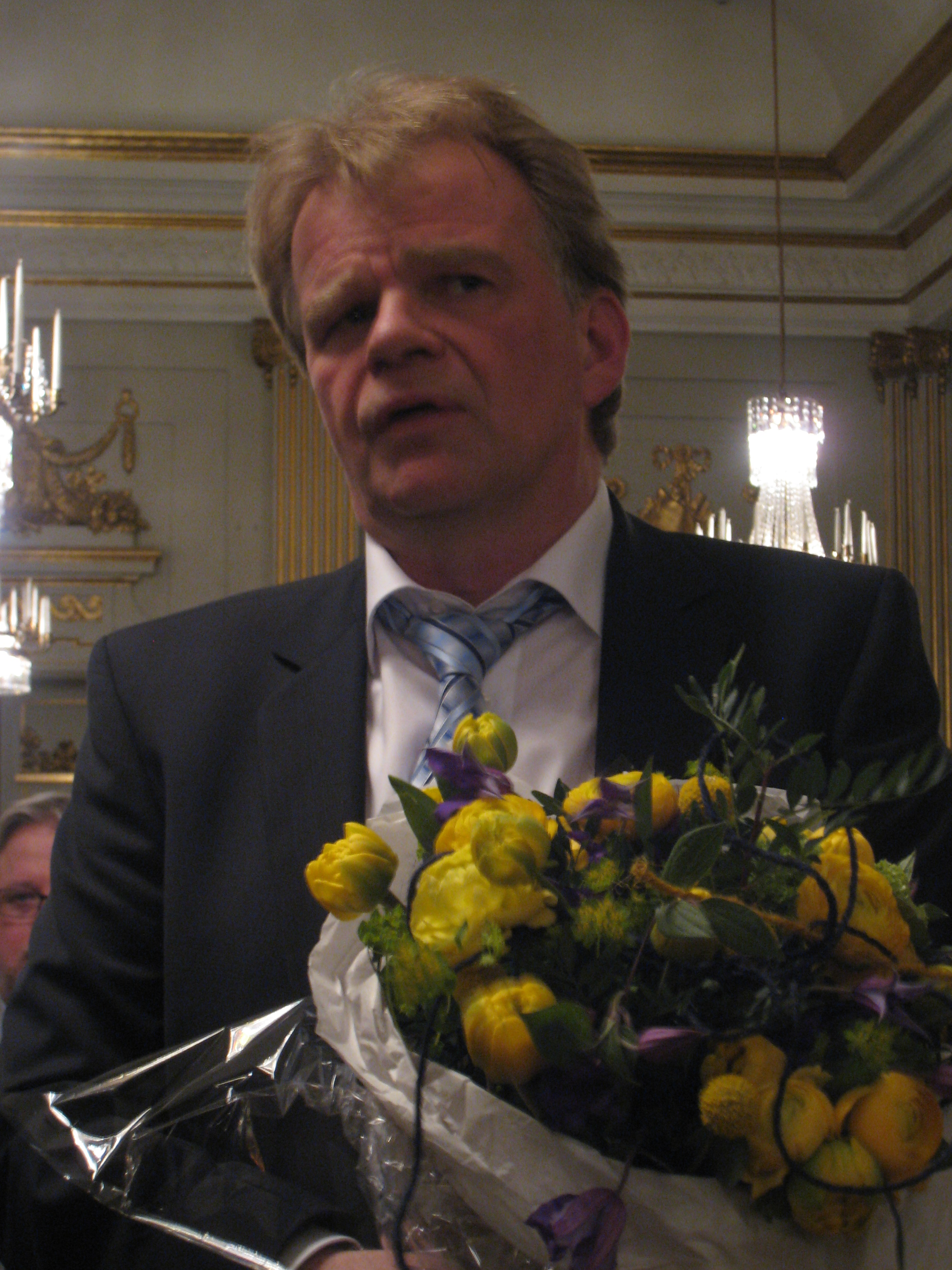
Guðmundsson in 2012

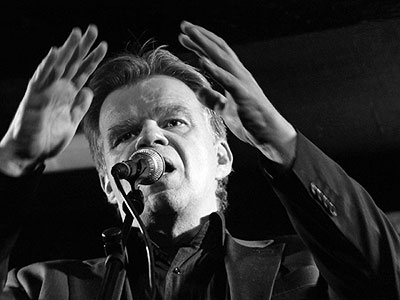
Guðmundsson in 2015

Einar Már Guðmundsson (born 18 September 1954 in Reykjavík) is an Icelandic author of novels, short stories, and poetry. His books have been translated into several languages.

== Background ==
Einar grew up in Reykjavík. In 1979 he received his Bachelor of Arts at the University of Iceland in comparative literature and history. He subsequently worked in the comparative literature department of the University of Copenhagen. Today, the author lives in Reykjavík, is married, and has five children.

== Works ==
Einar's first book was poetry and his best-known work is his novel Englar alheimsins (Angels of the Universe), subsequently adapted as a film.

- 1980: Sendisveinninn er einmana, poetry (Gallerí Suðurgata 7, Reykjavík)
- 1980: Er nokkur í Kórónafötum hér inni?, poetry (Gallerí Suðurgata 7, Reykjavík)
- 1981: Róbinson Krúsó snýr aftur, poetry (Iðunn, Reykjavík)
- 1982: Riddarar hringstigans, novel (Almenna bókafélagið, Reykjavík)
- 1983: Vængjasláttur í þakrennum, novel (Almenna bókafélagið, Reykjavík)
- 1986: Eftirmáli regndropanna, novel (Almenna bókafélagið, Reykjavík)
- 1988: Leitin að dýragarðinum, short stories (Almenna bókafélagið, Reykjavík)
- 1990: Rauðir dagar, novel (Almenna bókafélagið, Reykjavík)
- 1991: Klettur í hafi, poetry (Almenna bókafélagið, Reykjavík)
- 1992: Fólkið í steininum, children's book (Almenna bókafélagið, Reykjavík)
- 1993: Hundakexið, children's book (Almenna bókafélagið, Reykjavík)
- 1993: Englar alheimsins, novel (Almenna bókafélagið, Reykjavík)
- 1995: Í augu óreiðunnar: ljóð eða eitthvað í þá áttina, poetry (Mál og menning, Reykjavík)
- 1995: Ljóð 1980–1981, poetry (Mál og menning, Reykjavík)
- 1997: Fótspor á himnum, novel (Mál og menning, Reykjavík)
- 2000: Draumar á jörðu, novel (Mál og menning, Reykjavík)
- 2001: Kannski er pósturinn svangur, short stories (Mál og menning, Reykjavík)
- 2002: Ljóð 1980–1995, poetry (Mál og menning, Reykjavík)
- 2002: Nafnlausir vegir, novel (Mál og menning, Reykjavik)
- 2004: Bítlaávarpið, novel (Mál og menning, Reykjavík)
- 2006: Ég stytti mér leið framhjá dauðanum, poetry (Mál og menning, Reykjavík)
- 2007: Rimlar hugans, novel (Mál og menning, Reykjavík)
- 2009: Hvíta bókin (The White Book), essays (Mál og menning, Reykjavík)
- 2011: Bankastræti núll (0 Bank Street), essays (Mál og menning, Reykjavík)
- 2012: Íslenskir kóngar (Icelandic Kings), novel (Mál og menning, Reykjavík)
- 2015: Hundadagar (Dog-Days), novel (Mál og menning, Reykjavík)

== Awards and honors ==
- 1995: The Nordic Council's Literature Prize for Englar alheimsins
- 1999: Karen Blixen medaljen from the Danish Academy
- 2002: Riddarakross of Hin íslenska fálkaorða fyrir framlag til íslenskra bókmennta
- 2012: Swedish Academy's Nordic Prize for services to Nordic literature
- 2015: Íslensku bókmenntaverðlaunin for his novel Hundadagar

== German language editions ==
- Die Ritter der runden Treppe (Riddarar hringstigans, 1982), Munich, Goldmann btb, 1999, ISBN 978-3-442-72495-6
- Engel des Universums (Englar alheimsins, 1993), Munich, Goldmann, Bd. 72514 btb, 2000, ISBN 978-3-442-72514-4
- Fußspuren am Himmel (Fótspor á himnum, 1997), Munich, Wien, Carl Hanser, 2001, ISBN 978-3-446-20051-7
