= Life's Too Good =

Studio album by the Sugarcubes
- Released: 25 April 1988
- Studios: Studio Sýrland, Reykjavík; Berry Street Studio, London; Orinoco Studios, London
- Genres: Alternative rock; dream pop
- Length: 33:05
- Labels: One Little Indian; Elektra
- Producers: Ray Shulman; Derek Birkett

The Sugarcubes chronology
Life's Too Good (1988)	Here Today, Tomorrow Next Week! (1989)

Singles from Life's Too Good
- 1. "Birthday" Released: August 1987; 2. "Coldsweat" Released: January 1988; 3. "Deus" Released: April 1988; 4. "Birthday (The Christmas Mix)" Released: August 1988; 5. "Motorcrash" Released: November 1988

Life's Too Good is the debut studio album by Icelandic alternative rock band the Sugarcubes. It was released 25 April 1988 by One Little Indian in the UK and Europe and in May 1988 by Elektra Records in the US. The album was an unexpected success and brought international attention for the band, especially to lead singer Björk, who would launch a successful solo career in 1993.

Consisting of veterans of Reykjavík's early 1980s rock culture, the band took elements of the post-punk sound that characterised the scene, intending to create a humorous take on pop music's optimism, which is reflected in the album's title. Despite never having intended to be taken seriously, and because of the success of their debut and their contractual obligations, the Sugarcubes went on to release two further studio albums.

== Background ==
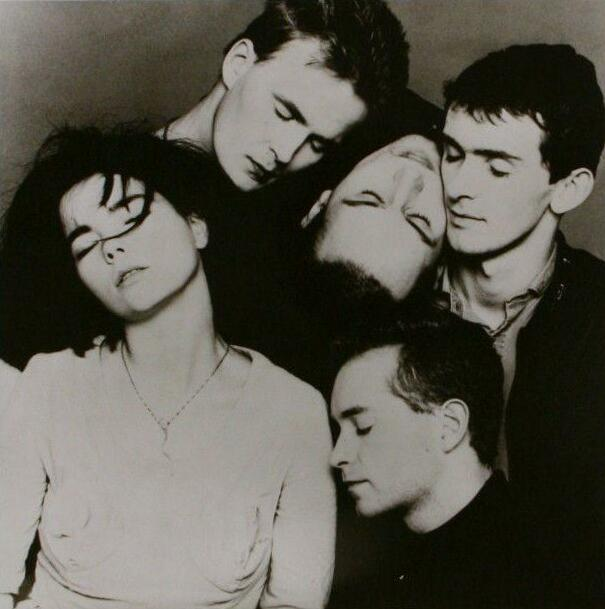
The Sugarcubes in 1988

The lead single "Birthday" was released on Derek Birkett's One Little Indian Records in August 1987. After influential magazine NME declared it "Single of the Week", the Sugarcubes, especially lead singer Björk, unexpectedly got the attention of the British music press. Across the following months, the band reluctantly appeared on the covers of the United Kingdom's most prominent pop magazines and experienced "massive hype" which generated a wave of interest from the press and the public. Despite offers by major labels like Warner Bros. and PolyGram, none of these labels were willing to give the Sugarcubes complete creative control, so the band decided to record the album themselves and release it on One Little Indian. During the album's recording sessions, founding guitarist Friðrik Erlingsson departed from the band. His position was not replaced, as the band opted to utilize a keyboardist for their live shows afterwards.

Life's Too Good was finally released in April 1988. "Coldsweat" and "Deus" were issued as singles prior to the album's release in January and April 1988 respectively, while the Jesus and Mary Chain's remix of "Birthday" (subtitled the "Christmas Mix") was released as a single in August 1988. "Motorcrash" followed as the album's final single in November 1988. While recording Life's Too Good, the Sugarcubes had befriended Howard Thompson, who worked in Elektra Records' A&R division; he orchestrated a licensing deal and the album was released in the United States. "Birthday" proved to be very successful on American college radio, before crossing over to mainstream radio. To the band's frustration, the American media also focused on Björk. At the end of 1988, the Sugarcubes undertook an American tour, which evolved into an international tour catapulted by the album's growing sales.

== Music ==
Robert Ham of Paste Magazine assessed: "In the hands of this pale quintet from Reykjavik, led by the intoxicating vocals and pixie-ish presence of Bjork Gudmundsdottir, post-punk, jazz and folk were twisted into multi-colored braids of arch pop and seamy revelations about untoward relationships between a bearded gent and a little girl, the joys of sex and gawking at a car crash."

== Artwork ==
Paul White of Me Company designed the artwork for Life's Too Good. The figures depicted in the artwork are derivations of a signature he had which consisted of a character "made up of just a face, legs and a [penis]." White stuck to using flat-color backgrounds; this discipline was born out of the need to keep printing costs as low as possible, and had previously been followed for the sleeve designs of the "Birthday" and "Coldsweat" singles. The album was issued in various color schemes, including green, yellow, blue and pink.

== Critical reception ==
Professional ratings
Review scores
Source	Rating
AllMusic	4.5/5 stars
The Line of Best Fit	9/10
Los Angeles Times	4/4 stars
NME	50/10
Record Collector	4/5 stars
Record Mirror	4/5
The Rolling Stone Album Guide	4/5 stars
Spin	3/5 stars
Spin Alternative Record Guide	8/10
The Village Voice	B−

Life's Too Good was released to largely positive reviews, receiving acclaim from the British and American press. In his review for NME, Steven Wells gave the album an unconventional score of fifty out of ten, awarding ten points each for "cheekiness", "naughtiness", "sexiness", "silliness" and "scariness". Nancy Culp of Record Mirror said that while the Sugarcubes' music is not particularly innovative, "their approach is fresh and their energy indisputable." Los Angeles Times critic Robert Hilburn commented that "Life's Too Good has the feel of an impact album: one of those rare debuts—like the first X or Talking Heads albums—that not only influence the creative underground but stretch the overall boundaries of rock." John Dougan praised Björk's vocals and the album's "strong" songs in a retrospective review for AllMusic, and considered that the album "lived up to all the advance hype."

Less impressed was Robert Christgau from The Village Voice, who wrote that the band's "sense of mischief isn't just playful—it's experimental and a little wicked. It's also so imperfectly realized that you have to infer it out from underneath their breathy swoops, willful shifts and starts, and translated lyrics—so imperfectly realized that most of their fans, critics included, barely notice it."

== Legacy ==
Life's Too Good is credited as the first Icelandic album "of its breed" to have a worldwide impact. Robert Ham of Paste Magazine wrote: "For many listeners, the debut by The Sugarcubes was an introduction into the singular universe that is the Icelandic music scene. It’s a place where, at the time, the various strains of influence from Europe and North America collided but were jumbled up gloriously in translation." In 2014, Treble wrote that the album "[generated] a larger interest towards the country’s popular and alternative music scenes alike." The album is considered a definite influence on all subsequent Icelandic popular music, and on international acts such as Savages and Florence and the Machine. Since its release, Life's Too Good has generated a dedicated following, and is nowadays cited as an important cult classic. The album helped in regarding the Sugarcubes as "the biggest rock band to emerge from Iceland." "Coldsweat" was covered by the industrial rock band Diatribe on the 1993 album Shut Up Kitty: A Cyber-Based Covers Compilation. In 2025, Radio X included the album in its list of "The 25 best indie debut albums of the 1980s".

=== Accolades ===
Accolades for Life's Too Good
Publication	Country	Accolade	Year	Rank
Best	France	Albums of the Year	1988	10
Christophe Brault	France	Top 20 Albums by Year 1964–2004	2006	15
Gilles Verlant	France	300+ Best Albums in the History of Rock	2013	*
Musik Express/Sounds	Germany	Albums of the Year	1988	13
RoRoRo Rock-Lexicon	Germany	Most Recommended Albums	2003	*
OOR	Netherlands	Albums of the Year	1988	24
Rock de Lux	Spain	Albums of the Year	1988	19
Melody Maker	United Kingdom	Albums of the Year	1988	2
NME	United Kingdom	Albums of the Year	1988	13
Q	United Kingdom	Albums of the Year	1988	*
Sounds	United Kingdom	Albums of the Year	1988	11
Robert Dimery	United States	1001 Albums You Must Hear Before You Die	2005	*
KCPR	United States	Top 100 Records from the 80s	2002	35
Treble	United States	The Best Albums of the 80s, by Year	2006	5
The Village Voice	United States	Albums of the Year	1988	35
(*) designates lists that are unordered.

== Track listing ==
All tracks are written by Bragi Ólafsson, Sigtryggur Baldursson, Þór Eldon, Björk Guðmundsdóttir, Einar Örn Benediktsson, and Friðrik Erlingsson, except otherwise noted.

Life's Too Good track listing
No.	Title	Writer(s)	Length
1.	"Traitor"		3:08
2.	"Motorcrash"		2:23
3.	"Birthday"		3:59
4.	"Delicious Demon"		2:43
5.	"Mama"	Ólafsson, Baldursson, Eldon, Guðmundsdóttir, Benediktsson	2:56
6.	"Coldsweat"		3:15
7.	"Blue Eyed Pop"		2:38
8.	"Deus"	Ólafsson, Baldursson, Eldon, Guðmundsdóttir, Benediktsson	4:07
9.	"Sick for Toys"	Ólafsson, Baldursson, Eldon, Guðmundsdóttir, Benediktsson	3:15
10.	"Fucking in Rhythm & Sorrow"		3:14
11.	"Take Some Petrol Darling" (hidden track)	Ólafsson, Baldursson, Eldon, Guðmundsdóttir, Benediktsson	1:27
Total length:			33:05

Life's Too Good – US CD bonus tracks
No.	Title	Writer(s)	Length
12.	"Cowboy"	Ólafsson, Baldursson, Eldon, Guðmundsdóttir, Benediktsson	3:27
13.	"I Want..."	Ólafsson, Baldursson, Eldon, Guðmundsdóttir, Benediktsson, Erlingsson, Jon Thurlow	2:55
14.	"Dragon" (Icelandic)		3:07
15.	"Cat" (Icelandic)		2:56
16.	"Coldsweat" (Remix)		3:42
17.	"Deus" (Remix)	Ólafsson, Baldursson, Eldon, Guðmundsdóttir, Benediktsson	6:03
Total length:			54:52

Life's Too Good – Japanese bonus track
No.	Title	Length
18.	"Traitor" (Icelandic)	3:07
Total length:		57:59

== Personnel ==
Credits adapted from the liner notes of Life's Too Good.

The Sugarcubes

- Bragi Ólafsson – bass
- Sigtryggur Baldursson – drums
- Þór Eldon – guitar
- Björk Guðmundsdóttir – vocals, keyboard
- Einar Örn Benediktsson – vocals, trumpet

Additional personnel

- Engineering – Brian Pugsley, Gail Lambourne, Gerard Johnson, Ken Thomas, Kjartan Kjartansson, Mel Jefferson
- Production – Derek Birkett and Ray Shulman
- Sleeve – Paul White
- Copyright – One Little Indian Records
- Publishing – Second Wind
- Design – Me Company
- Distribution – The Cartel

== Charts ==
Chart performance for Life's Too Good
Chart (1988)	Peak position
Australian Albums Chart	64
Canada Top Albums/CDs (RPM)	59
UK Albums Chart	14
UK Indie Albums Chart	1
US Billboard 200	54

== Sales ==
Sales for Life's Too Good
Region	Sales
United States	500,000
Worldwide	1,000,000
