= Kristín Marja Baldursdóttir =

Icelandic writer

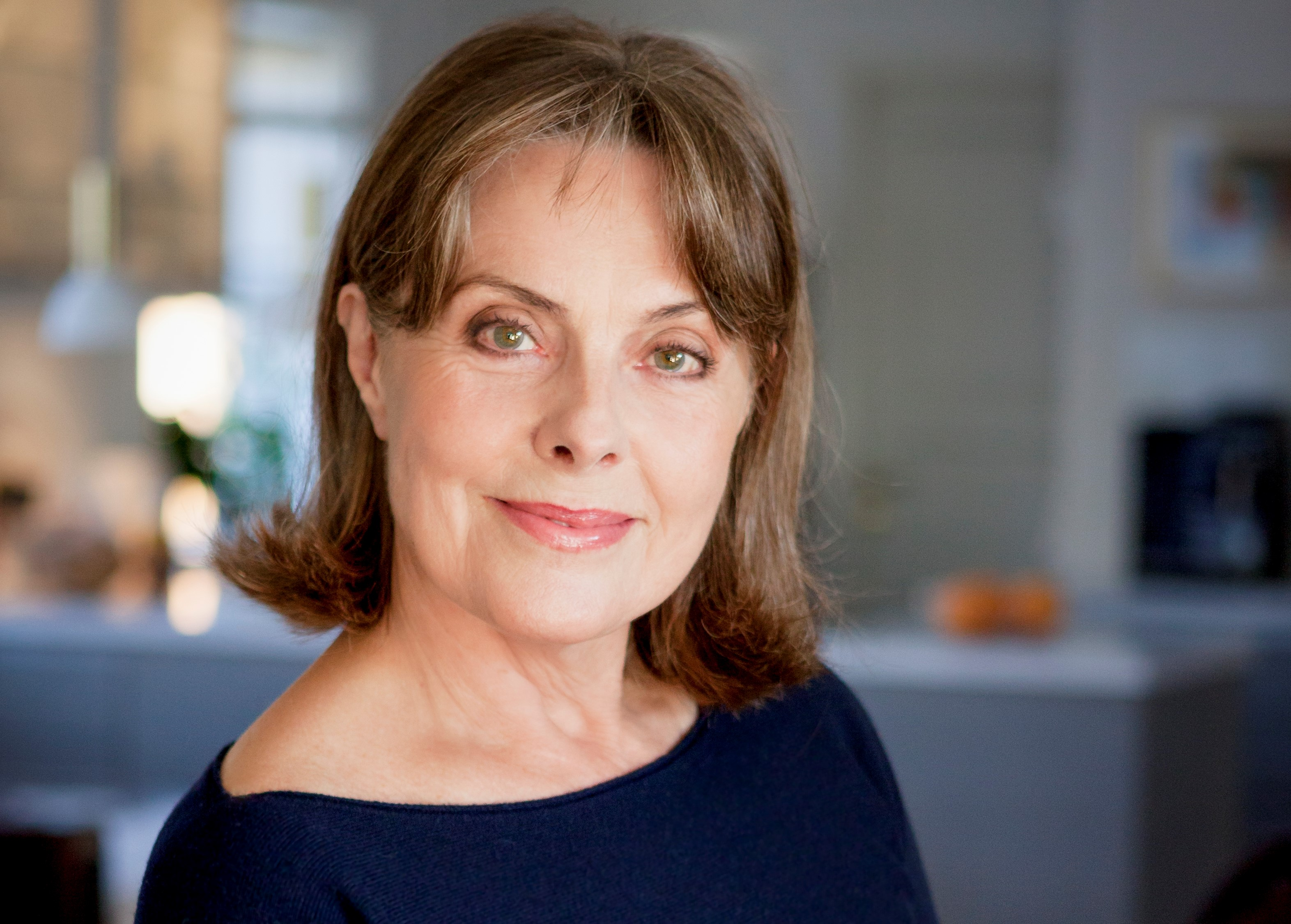
Portrait of Kristin Marja Baldursdottir

Kristín Marja Baldursdóttir (born January 21, 1949 in Hafnarfjörður) is an Icelandic writer.

== Background ==
She received her degree in 1991 from the University of Iceland in the fields of German and Icelandic.

== Writing ==
Her first novel Mávahlátur (Seagull's Laughter) became a play and film. Her work has been translated into German, Dutch, Danish, Norwegian and Swedish. Within Iceland, her 'work has [...] been important in breaking down the borders between elite and popular culture', her novels tending to focus on 'women's issues in contemporary urban society'.

== Honors ==
On November 16, 2011, Kristín Marja received the Jónas Hallgrímsson Award, given every year to an important Icelandic writer. According to the jury's verdict, "Kristín Marja's subject matter is the reality of Icelandic women. She illuminates the life and work, dreams and longings of women."

== Novels ==
- Mávahlátur (The Seagull's Laughter) 1995
- Hús úr húsi (From House to House) 1997
- Kular af degi (As the Day gets colder) 1999
- Mynd af konu ( Portrait of a woman) 2000
- Kvöldljósin eru kveikt (The Nightlights are on) 2001
- Karitas án titils (Karitas untitled) 2004
- Óreiða á striga (Chaos on Canvas) 2007
- Karlsvagninn (The Big Dipper) 2009
- Kantata (Cantata) 2012
- Svartalogn (Black Calm) 2016
- Gata mæðranna (Street of the Mothers) 2020
