= Devil's Island (1996 film) =

1996 Icelandic film directed by Friðrik Þór Friðriksson

- English-language promotional poster
- Directed by: Friðrik Þór Friðriksson
- Written by: Einar Kárason
- Produced by: Peter Aalbæk Jensen; Friðrik Þór Friðriksson; Egil Ødegård; Peter Rommel
- Starring: Baltasar Kormákur; Gísli Halldórsson; Sigurveig Jónsdóttir
- Music by: Björgvin Helgi Halldórsson; Hilmar Örn Hilmarsson
- Release date: 3 October 1996
- Running time: 99 minutes
- Country: Iceland
- Language: Icelandic
- Box office: ISK 55 million

Devil's Island (Icelandic: Djöflaeyjan) is a 1996 Icelandic film directed by Friðrik Þór Friðriksson. It is a dark comedy filmed in the Grótta area of South west Iceland. The story depicts a group of otherwise homeless families living in barracks abandoned by the US Air Force after the Second World War. The film was selected as the Icelandic entry for the Best Foreign Language Film at the 69th Academy Awards, but was not accepted as a nominee. It was the second highest-grossing film in Iceland, behind Titanic.

The film's themes include an ambivalence towards America and Americans, poverty and the accompanying social stigma, superstition and the spirit world, and a destructive family dynamic. The sound-track combines American pop (some of it performed in Icelandic) and a score by Hilmar Örn Hilmarsson.

== Cast ==
- Baltasar Kormákur as Baddi
- Gísli Halldórsson as Thomas
- Sigurveig Jónsdóttir as Karolina
- Halldóra Geirharðsdóttir as Dolly
- Guðmundur Ólafsson as Grettir
- Sveinn Geirsson as Danni

== Plot ==
The story follows a few poor families living in Nissen huts abandoned by American armed forces. Gogo marries an American soldier Charlie and leaves the squalid camp for the USA. One of her sons Baddi steals a pistol left in car by the Americans. A young boy finds the gun and shoots himself with it. A former athlete living in the camp breaks the shot put record, but is disqualified for using undersize shot. Baddi goes to the USA to visit his mother and returns in black leather jacket, sunglasses and a red American car. Baddi picks up Sigurjon from prison, and they go to a rock'n'roll dance and get in a fight. Then bring some women back to the camp to party on, which results in police being called. Grandma begs the police not to take Baddi but he later fights his own brother, and ends up being arrested. Sigurjon borrows money from his grandfather and goes to a fine restaurant with Baddi, but shuts grandpa out in the snow. Baddi starts dating Hveragerdur, whom his brother Danni had a crush on. Baddi marries her, but becomes a deadbeat husband. Danni has flying lessons and becomes a pilot. Baddi continues on a downward spiral and asks his mother for plane tickets to USA. Grandma, who is a fortune teller sees a fatal plane crash. She thinks Baddi will be killed, but Danni dies instead. Hveragerdur and Baddi have a child. Gogo divorces the American Charlie. The camp is demolished and the families moved into nearby block of flats. Baddi continues to be a lazy drunk, even falling over when visiting Danni's grave.

== Reception ==
The film opened at number one at the Icelandic box office and went on to be the highest-grossing Icelandic film of all time and the second highest-grossing film in Iceland behind Titanic with a gross of 55 million Icelandic króna ($770,000) from 75,000 admissions.

== See also ==
- List of submissions to the 69th Academy Awards for Best Foreign Language Film
- List of Icelandic submissions for the Academy Award for Best Foreign Language Film
