= The Sugarcubes =

Icelandic rock band

The Sugarcubes Sykurmolarnir
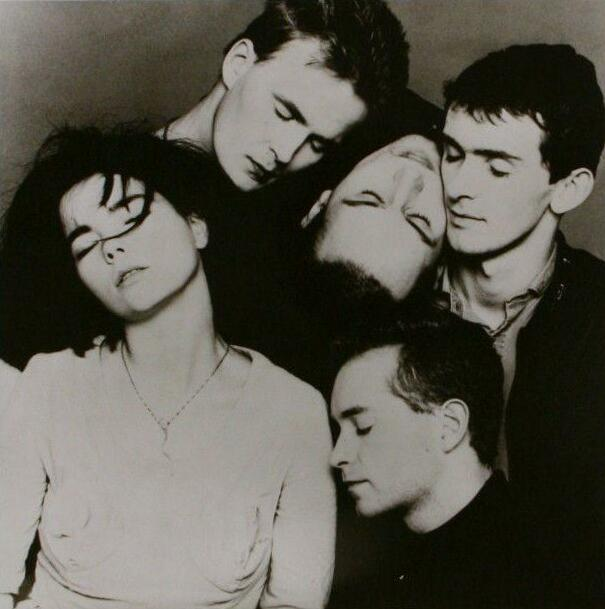
- The Sugarcubes in 1988

Background information
- Origin: Reykjavík, Iceland
- Genres: Alternative rock; post-punk; avant-pop; post-rock
- Years active: 1986–1992; 2006
- Labels: One Little Indian; Elektra
- Spinoff of: Kukl; Purrkur Pillnikk; Þeyr
- Past members: Björk Guðmundsdóttir; Einar Örn Benediktsson; Sigtryggur Baldursson; Þór Eldon; Bragi Ólafsson; Friðrik Erlingsson; Margrét Örnólfsdóttir; Einar Melax

The Sugarcubes (Icelandic: Sykurmolarnir) were an Icelandic alternative rock band from Reykjavík formed in 1986 and disbanded in 1992. For most of their career, the band consisted of Björk Guðmundsdóttir (vocals, keyboards), Einar Örn Benediktsson (vocals, trumpet), Þór Eldon (guitar), Bragi Ólafsson (bass), Margrét "Magga" Örnólfsdóttir (keyboards) and Sigtryggur Baldursson (drums). Previous members included Friðrik Erlingsson (guitar) and Einar Melax (keyboards).

The Sugarcubes' debut album, Life's Too Good (1988), was an unexpected international success, and produced their signature song "Birthday". It is credited as the first Icelandic album to have a worldwide impact and influenced Icelandic popular music. Their follow-up album, Here Today, Tomorrow Next Week!, was released 1989 to mixed reviews. Their third and final album, Stick Around for Joy, released in February 1992, was better received and produced the successful singles "Hit" and "Leash Called Love".

Rolling Stone referred to them as "the biggest rock band to emerge from Iceland." Björk would later become an internationally successful solo musician and the bestselling Icelandic musician of all time.

== History ==
=== 1977–1986: Formation and early years ===
The members of the Sugarcubes had formerly been in a variety of Icelandic bands. Björk Guðmundsdóttir had the longest career out of any of the members; she had recorded an album when she was 11. In her late teens, she joined the Icelandic post-punk band Tappi Tíkarrass, who released two albums before splitting in 1983. Drummer Sigtryggur "Siggi" Baldursson was a member of Þeyr, while Einar Örn Benediktsson, Bragi Ólafsson and Friðrik Erlingsson formed a punk band called Purrkur Pillnikk. By 1984, Björk, Einar Örn and Siggi had formed the group Kukl with keyboardist Einar Melax, and released two albums on the independent British record label Crass Records.

The Sugarcubes formed on 8 June 1986 with Björk on vocals, Einar Örn on vocals, Björk's then-husband Þór (Thor) Eldon on guitar, Friðrik Erlingsson on guitar and Bragi Ólafsson on bass. On the same day, Björk gave birth to her and Þór Eldon's son, Sindri Eldon. The band first performed in July 1988 under the name "Þukl" at the N'Art Festival held at the Nordic Culture Centre in Reykjavik, Iceland. In August of that same year, the band first performed as Sykurmolarnir (Icelandic for Sugarcubes) at the Roxzý nightclub in Reykjavik, Iceland. Some have assumed that the band's name referred to LSD use, but it is more likely in keeping with their intention to form a "cute" pop band, which was in stark contrast to the band members' previous music endeavours.

=== 1987–1988: Life's Too Good ===
In late 1987, the band signed to One Little Indian in the UK and to Elektra Records in the US. They released their debut album, Life's Too Good, in 1988 to critical acclaim in both the UK and the US. They first came to notice in the UK when BBC radio DJ John Peel played "Birthday", which was later voted by his listeners as No. 1 in the 1987 Festive Fifty, and No. 23 in the All Time Chart. Their music has been described as avant-pop, and was characterized by a psychedelic post-punk sound sometimes reminiscent of the B-52's and Talking Heads, whimsical yet heartfelt lyrics, and the imploring, girlish voice of Björk, accompanied by Einar Örn's erratic vocal performances. In the last quarter of 1988, The Sugarcubes toured North America to positive reception. In September, the band played at The Ritz in New York, a concert attended by David Bowie and Iggy Pop. On 15 October the band appeared on Saturday Night Live with a performance of their songs "Birthday" and "Motorcrash".

=== 1989–1990: Here Today, Tomorrow Next Week! ===
Here Today, Tomorrow Next Week!, the band's second album, was released in September 1989. The greater vocal contribution by Einar Örn on the record was criticized in many of the record's reviews, which were noticeably weaker than those for Life's Too Good. Not all critics agreed that it was worse than their debut album, though. Robert Christgau rated it a B+, higher than the B− he gave Life's Too Good. The singles "Regina" and "Planet" topped the UK indie charts but fared poorly in the mainstream charts outside of Iceland. After the release of Here Today, Tomorrow Next Week!, the band embarked on a lengthy international tour. At the end of the tour, they started to ponder splitting up and went on a hiatus.

=== 1990–1992: Stick Around for Joy and breakup ===
At the conclusion of the tour in late 1990, the band members pursued their own interests. Stick Around for Joy, their third and final album, was released in February 1992. It featured guest guitarist John McGeoch (formerly of Magazine and Siouxsie and the Banshees) on the opening track, "Gold". The album received noticeably better reviews than Here Today, Tomorrow Next Week!, and spawned the band's first big hit single, the aptly titled "Hit". Further singles "Walkabout" and "Vitamin" failed to make any chart impact. The Sugarcubes opened for U2 during the US leg of their Zoo TV Tour in October and November 1992, playing to a total of 700,000 people.

A remix album, It's-It, was released in October 1992 along with a re-release of "Birthday" which was backed by numerous remixes of the song. One single that was released from the compilation, the Tony Humphries remix of "Leash Called Love", reached number one on Billboard's Hot Dance Club Songs Chart in 1992.

The Sugarcubes disbanded in late December 1992. The members remain involved in the management of record label Smekkleysa (Bad Taste Ltd). Björk embarked on a solo career, coming to prominence with albums such as Debut (1993), Post (1995), and Homogenic (1997).

=== 2006: Reunion ===
On 17 November 2006 the band had a one-off reunion concert at Laugardalshöll sport arena in Reykjavík, Iceland, to celebrate the 20th anniversary of their debut single, "Birthday", with all profits going to the non-profit Smekkleysa SM to promote Icelandic music. They were supported by fellow Icelandic groups múm and Rass. Despite this reunion, the group has expressed that it has no intention to play future shows or record new material.

== Style ==
Trouser Press wrote that the drumming and guitar work were influenced by Joy Division, Siouxsie and the Banshees and also Cocteau Twins on the slow numbers. The group also incorporated "electronically mutated trumpet and sound effects". The other instrument is Björk's voice, containing a "range of emotions", being one moment "a little girl soprano" and then next "a crazed animal". Einar also sings on certain tracks with Björk on background vocals. Pitchfork characterized the band as avant-rock.

== Members ==
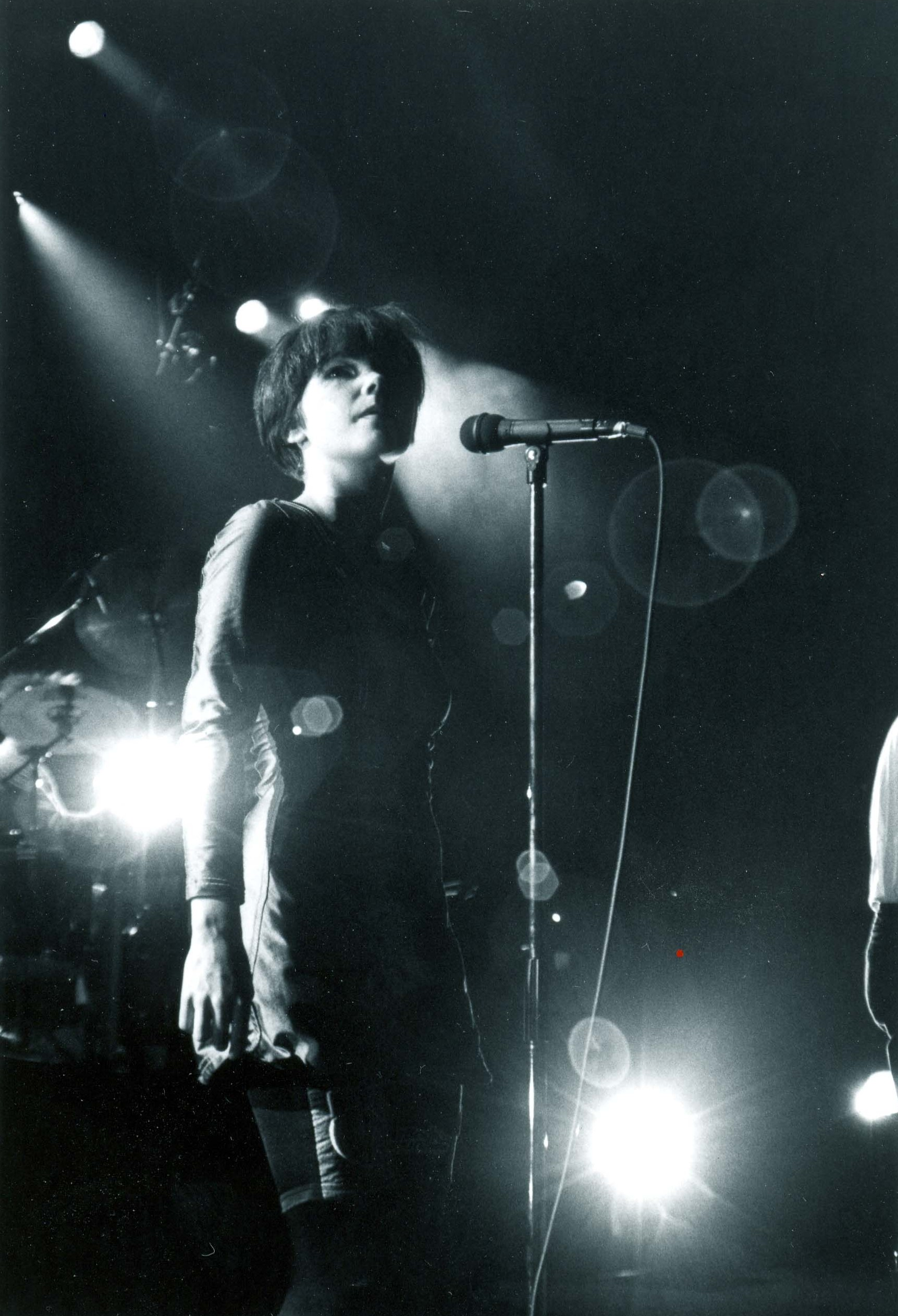
The Sugarcubes performing in Japan

Final line-up

- Björk Guðmundsdóttir – vocals, keyboards (1986–1992, 2006)
- Þór Eldon Jónsson – guitar (1986–1992, 2006)
- Bragi Ólafsson – bass (1986–1992, 2006)
- Einar Örn Benediktsson – vocals, trumpet (1986–1992, 2006)
- Sigtryggur "Siggi" Baldursson – drums, percussion (1987–1992, 2006)
- Margrét "Magga" Örnólfsdóttir – keyboards (1989–1992, 2006)

Former members

- Fridrik Erlingsson – guitar (1986–1988)
- Einar Melax – keyboards (1987–1989)
- Tomasz Mertonski – jazz flute (1988–1989)

== Discography ==
The Sugarcubes discography
- Studio albums: 3
- Compilation albums: 1
- Singles: 14
- Video albums: 4
- Music videos: 14
- Box sets: 4
- Remix albums: 1

=== Studio albums ===
Title	Album details	Peak chart positions					
Title	Album details	AUS	GER	NLD	SWE	UK	US
Life's Too Good	Release date: April 1988; Label: One Little Indian, Elektra; Formats: CD, LP, cassette	64	—	—	48	14	54
Here Today, Tomorrow Next Week!	Released: September 1989; Label: One Little Indian, Elektra; Formats: CD, LP, cassette	105	—	—	—	15	70
Stick Around for Joy	Released: 10 February 1992; Label: One Little Indian, Elektra; Formats: CD, LP, cassette	74	58	71	29	16	95
"—" denotes items which were not released in that country or failed to chart.

=== Compilations and remixes ===
Title	Album details	Peak chart positions	
Title	Album details	AUS	UK
It's-It	Release date: 5 October 1992; Label: One Little Indian, Elektra; Formats: CD, LP, cassette	162	47
The Great Crossover Potential	Released: 14 July 1998; Label: One Little Indian, Elektra; Formats: CD, LP, cassette	158	161

=== Singles ===
Year	Song	Peak chart positions								Album
Year	Song	AUS	IRE	NZ	SWE	UK	UK Indie	US Alt	US Dance	Album
1986	"Einn Mol'á Mann" (ICE only) (as Sykurmolarnir)	—	—	—	—	—	—	—	—	non-album singles
1987	"Luftguitar" (ICE only) (as Johnny Triumph & Sykurmolarnir)	—	—	—	—	—	—	—	—	non-album singles
1987	"Birthday"	—	—	—	—	65	2	—	—	Life's Too Good
1988	"Coldsweat"	—	—	—	—	56	1	—	—	Life's Too Good
1988	"Deus"	—	—	—	—	51	2	—	—	Life's Too Good
1988	"Birthday" (Reissue)	—	—	41	—	65	1	—	—	Life's Too Good
1988	"Motorcrash" (Continental Europe/US only)	—	—	—	—	—	—	10	—	Life's Too Good
1989	"Regina"	141	27	—	—	55	1	2	—	Here Today, Tomorrow Next Week!
1989	"Planet"	—	—	—	—	97	—	—	—	Here Today, Tomorrow Next Week!
1992	"Hit"	76	18	—	28	17	—	1	—	Stick Around for Joy
1992	"Walkabout"	—	—	—	—	82	—	16	—	Stick Around for Joy
1992	"Vitamin"	—	—	—	—	—	—	—	—	Stick Around for Joy
1992	"Leash Called Love"	—	—	—	—	—	—	—	1	It's It
1992	"Birthday" (Remix)	—	—	—	—	64	—	—	—	It's It
"—" denotes releases that did not chart or were not released.

=== Vinyl and CD boxes ===
- 1989 – 12.11 (One Little Indian Records)
- 1989 – 7.8 (One Little Indian Records)
- 1989 – CD.6 (One Little Indian Records)
- 2006 – The Complete Studio Albums Box – 3× CD repacked box with three main English language studio albums. Released to celebrate 20th Anniversary reunion concert (One Little Indian Records)

=== Collaborations and featuring ===
- 1987 – Snarl II (Erðanumúsík), Icelandic compilation. Featuring under the name of Sykurmolarnir.
- 1987 – Luftgítar (Smekkleysa), album by Johnny Triumph.
- 1987 – Skytturnar (Gramm), soundtrack to the movie directed by Friðrik Þór Fríðriksson.
- 1988 – One Little Indian - Greatest Hits Volume One (One Little Indian), greatest hits (volume 1) released by One Little Indian.
- 1990 – Hættuleg hljómsveit & glæpakvendið Stella (Megas), album by Megas.
- 1990 – World Domination or Death Volume 1 (Smekkleysa/Workers Playtime PLAY), compilation.
- 1990 – One Little Indian - Greatest Hits Volume Two (One Little Indian), greatest hits (volume 2) released by One Little Indian.
- 1990 – Rubáiyát: Elektra's 40th Anniversary (Elektra Records), Elektra Records anniversary compilation.
- 1993 – Welcome to the Future (One Little Indian), compilation.

=== Other releases ===
- 1988 – Sugarcubes Interview Disc (One Little Indian)
- 1998 – Avengers (soundtrack) (WEA/Atlantic)- Feat. Annie Lennox's cover of The Sugarcubes' "Mama"
- 1998 – Music Inspired by the Motion Picture: The Avengers (BIG EAR)

== Videography ==
=== Video albums ===
- 1989 – Live Zabor, VHS, collection of live performances from 1988/89 and interviews
- 1991 – The Video (Sugarcubes video album), VHS/laserdisc, music video collection
- 1992 – Murder and Killing in Hell, VHS, 1992 live concert performance, Manchester Academy UK
- 1992 - Sykurmolarnir – Á Guðs Vegum (The Sugarcubes - On God's Way), Icelandic VHS of various live performances and remixes
- 2004 – The DVD (One Little Indian), music video collection, re-issue of 'The Video' with additional bonus videos. Later reissued by Rhino in the United States in 2006.
- 2004 – Live Zabor DVD (One Little Indian), re-issue. Later reissued by Rhino in the United States in 2006.

=== Music videos ===
Year	Title	Director	Ref.
1987	"Luftgitar" (w/ Johnny Triumph)	The Sugarcubes	
1987	"Ammæli" ("Birthday" Icelandic)	Friðrik Þór Friðriksson / The Sugarcubes	
1987	"Birthday" (English)	Kristín Jóhannesdóttir / Saga Films	
1987	"Birthday" (English, Live)	Andy Lee / Martin Hart	
1988	"Cold Sweat"	Óskar Jónasson / The Sugarcubes	
1988	"Deus"	Óskar Jónasson / Myndbandagerd Reykjavikur	
1988	"Motorcrash"	Óskar Jónasson / Frost Film	
1989	"Regina"	Óskar Jónasson / Þorgeir Gunnarsson	
1989	"Planet"	Óskar Jónasson	
1989	"Eat the Menu"	Hyja Bio / Þorgeir Gunnarsson	
1989	"Tidal Wave"	Hyja Bio / -	
1991	"Hit"	Óskar Jónasson	
1992	"Hit" (Version 2)	Pedro Romhanyi	
1992	"Walkabout"	Pedro Romhanyi	
1992	"Vitamin"	The Sugarcubes	
