= Leash Called Love =

- Official cover art of the Mo Nu Dub mix

Single by the Sugarcubes

from the album It's-It
- Released: 15 October 1992
- Length: 3:42 (album); 6:27 (club version)
- Label: One Little Indian; Elektra
- Songwriter: The Sugarcubes
- Producer: Paul Fox

The Sugarcubes singles chronology
"Vitamin" (1992)	"Leash Called Love" (1992)

"Leash Called Love" is a song written and recorded by Icelandic alternative rock band the Sugarcubes. It was released in October 1992 by One Little Indian and Elektra Records as the only single from their remix album, It's-It (1992). The track dealt with the subject of a woman's vow to break free from the emotional and physical abuse from her lover, hence the song's title. Originally released on their third and last studio album, Stick Around for Joy (1992), the track was restructured into a house music setting by Tony Humphries for It's-It. The song would also be the group's final single release before their break up in 1993.

The song found success on the US Billboard Dance/Club Play chart, becoming the act's first and only number-one single on that chart, and cemented lead singer Björk's new found success in the dance and electronic music community.

== Track listing ==
- 12" (US)

A1. "Leash Called Love" (12" Mix) 6:25
A2. "Leash Called Love" (Mo Nu Dub) 6:18
B1. "Leash Called Love" (Mo No Ride) 6:24

== Charts ==
Chart (1992)	Peak position
UK Dance (Music Week)	50
UK Club Chart (Music Week)	13
US Hot Dance Club Play (Billboard)	1

== See also ==
- List of number-one dance singles of 1992 (U.S.)
