= Georg Guðni Hauksson =

Icelandic landscape painter

Georg Guðni Hauksson (1 January 1961 – 18 June 2011) was an Icelandic landscape painter.

== Biography ==
From 1980 to 1985, Georg Guðni studied at the Visual Art and Handicraft College in Reykjavík and from 1985 to 1987 at the Jan Van Eyck Academie in Maastricht.

His first solo exhibition at the Living Art Museum in Reykjavik in 1985 attracted much attention, as it presented a special view of landscape painting with innovative formal and conceptual interpretation. Georg Guðni won several awards for his work, including DV Cultural Award in 1988, he was nominated for the Ars Fennica Award in 2000 and three times he was nominated for the Carnegie Art Award.

He died suddenly in June 2011, survived by his wife, Sigrun Jónasdóttir, and five children.
