= Lionrock =

Band

Lionrock were a British big beat group, comprising record producer Justin Robertson, MC Buzz B, and producer, engineer, programmer and synthesist Roger Lyons. Lyons replaced recording engineer Mark Stagg in 1995. Their biggest chart success came in 1998, when "Rude Boy Rock" reached the top 20 of the UK Singles Chart.

The group formed in 1992, and signed to Deconstruction Records in 1993.

Their song "Rude Boy Rock" was featured in the video game FIFA '99, as well as on the soundtrack to the 1999 film Idle Hands. This song samples "Nimrod" (1965) by Jamaican reggae band Skatalites. Their song "Fire Up the Shoesaw" was included on the soundtrack of the 1999 film Go.

== Discography ==
=== Albums ===
- An Instinct for Detection (1996) - UK No. 30
- City Delirious (1998) - UK No. 73

=== Singles ===
- "Lionrock" (1992) - UK No. 63
- "Packet of Peace" (1993) - UK No. 32
- "Carnival" (1993) - UK No. 34
- "Tripwire" (1994) - UK No. 44
- "Straight at Yer Head" (1996) - UK No. 33
- "Fire Up the Shoeshaw" (1996) - UK No. 43
- "Project Now" (1996) - UK No. 97
- "Wet Roads Glisten" (1997) - UK No. 80
- "She's on the Train" (1997) - UK No. 77
- "Rude Boy Rock" (1998) - UK No. 20
- "Scatter and Swing" (1998) - UK No. 54
