= Einar Kárason =

Icelandic writer (born 1955)

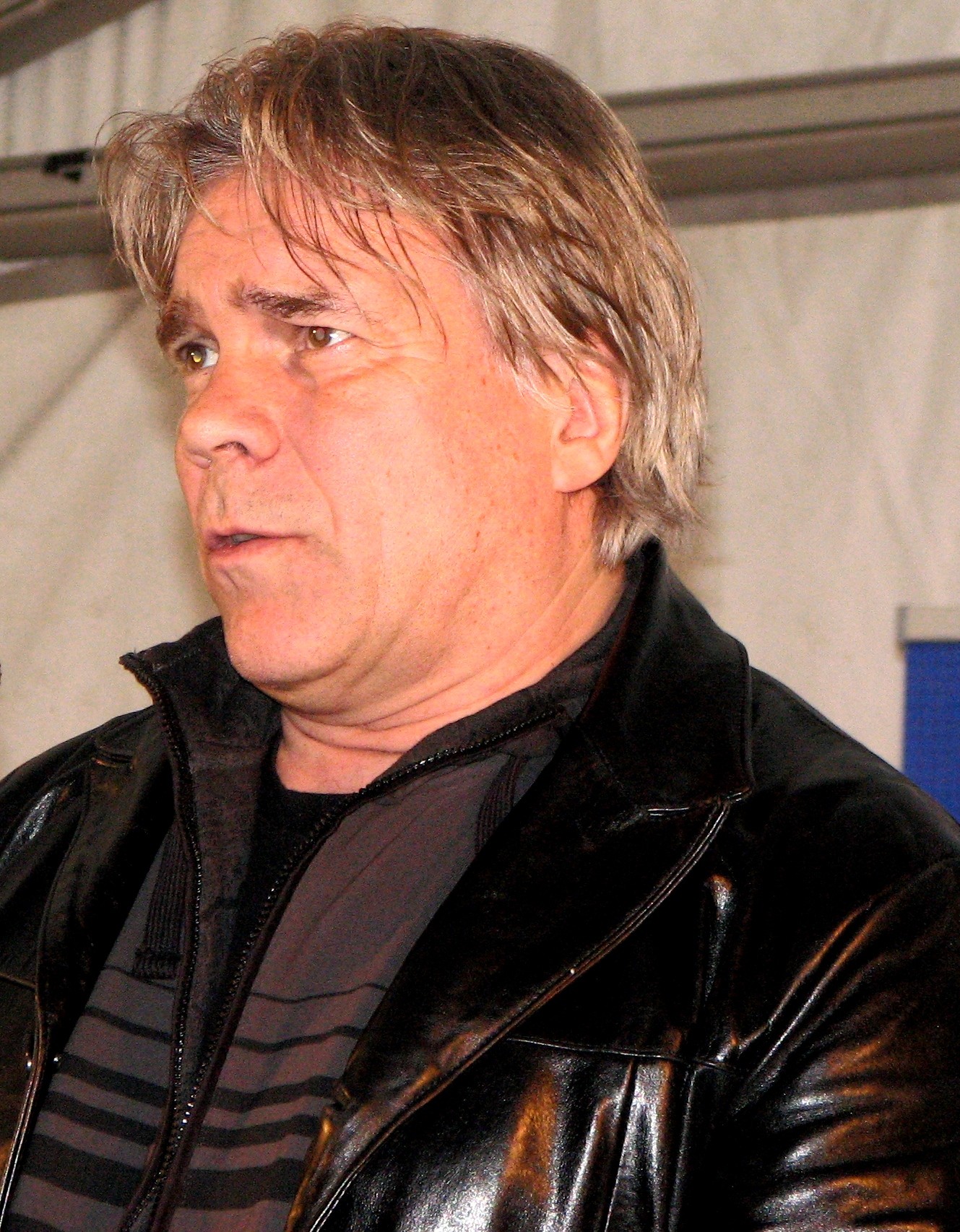
- Einar Kárason performing in Tallinn Literary Festival HeadRead 2010
- Born: 24 November 1955 (age 70); Reykjavík, Iceland
- Education: University of Iceland
- Writing career
- Language: Icelandic
- Notable work: Devil's Island (1983)

Einar Kárason (born 24 November 1955 in Reykjavík, Iceland) is an Icelandic writer and poet.

Einar has been a full-time writer since 1978. He started his career with poetry in literary magazines from 1978 to 1980. In 1981 he published his first novel. He is best known for his novel Þar sem djöflaeyjan rís. which was translated into English as Devil's Island and became the first book in a trilogy about the life of a working-class family in Reykjavík in the post-war years. The book was also made into the film Devil's Island. He has been on the board or acted as chairman for several Icelandic writing associations.

He wrote a book about the Sturlungar family clan, Óvinafagnaður, in which all the most famous Vikings from Iceland come together and finally battle for power over Iceland. Einar has received various awards and nominations for his writing, including the Icelandic Literature Prize in 2008. He has also been nominated for the Nordic Council Literature Prize four times in 1987, 1996, 2005 and 2010.

In 2018, he was featured in the Rogue Fitness documentary feature film 'Fullsterkur' (literally translates as 'full strength' in English) which explores the Sagas of Icelanders and the history and culture of heavy stone lifting in Iceland.

== Bibliography ==
=== Novels ===
- Þetta eru asnar Guðjón, 1981
- Þar sem djöflaeyjan rís, 1983
- Gulleyjan, 1985
- Fyrirheitna Landið, 1989
- Heimskra manna ráð, 1992
- Kvikasilfur, 1994
- Norðurljós, 1998
- Óvinafagnaður, 2001
- Stormur, 2003
- Ofsi, 2008
- Skáld, 2012
- Skálmöld, 2014
- Passíusálmarnir, 2016
- Stormfuglar, 2018
- Með sigg á sálinni, 2019
