= Bragi Ólafsson =

Icelandic musician and writer

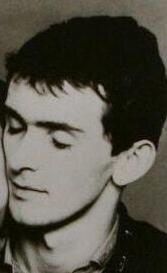
- Bragi in 1988

Background information
- Born: 11 August 1962 (age 63); Reykjavík, Iceland
- Occupations: Musician, writer
- Instrument: Bass
- Formerly of: The Sugarcubes
- Website: http://bragi.funksjon.net/

Bragi Ólafsson (born 11 August 1962 in Reykjavík, Iceland) is an Icelandic musician and a writer.

Internationally he is best known for his work as a bassist in The Sugarcubes, the avant-garde pop band from Iceland that brought fame to Björk, who went on to solo success with her unique brand of diverse musical genres.

The Sugarcubes, who favoured strange, offbeat melodies, came together in 1986, but the Sugarcubes' members had played together in different combinations in various Icelandic groups before. Bragi and Einar Örn Benediktsson (trumpet / vocals) had released records on Einar's own label, Gramm. In 1986 Bragi also launched his writing career, publishing his first book, a poetry volume called Dragsúgur (Draught).

In 1992 The Sugarcubes disbanded as Björk began her solo career. Bragi, meanwhile, has continued to work on Bad Taste Ltd., the company formed by the Sugarcubes to publish poetry and sign other bands but is no longer a practising musician.

He enjoys considerable success as a novelist, playwright and poet in Iceland, having twice been nominated to the Icelandic Literature Prize.

== Books translated into English ==
- The Pets (translation Janice Balfour. Open Letter, New York. 2008)
- The Ambassador (translation Lytton Smith. Open Letter, New York. 2010)
- Narrator (translation Lytton Smith. Open Letter, New York. 2018)
