= Edda Award for Best Leading Actor or Actress =

Icelandic film award for actresses and actors

Best Leading Actor or Actress is one of the categories at the Edda Awards. It has been given since 1999, annually.

== 1999-2025 ==
From 1999 to 2003, 2007 to 2008, and 2010 to 2016, there was one Edda Award to the best actor and other Edda Award to the best actress. No awards were held in 2009.

Winners – Best Actor:

Year	Actor	Film
1999	Ingvar Eggert Sigurðsson	Slurpinn & Co.
2000	Ingvar Eggert Sigurðsson	Englar alheimsins (Angels of the Universe)
2001	Jón Gnarr	Fóstbræður (Blood brothers)
2002	Gunnar Eyjólfsson	Hafið (The Sea)
2003	Tómas Lemarquis	Nói albínói (Noi the Albino)
2007	Ingvar Eggert Sigurðsson	Foreldrar (Parents)
2008	Hilmir Snær Guðnason	Brúðguminn (White Night Wedding)
2010	Jón Gnarr	Bjarnfreðarson and Fangavaktin (The Prison Shift)
2011	Ólafur Darri Ólafsson	Rokland (Stormland)
2012	Theódór Júlíusson	Eldfjall (Volcano)
2013	Ólafur Darri Ólafsson	Djúpið (The Deep)
2014	Ingvar Eggert Sigurðsson	Hross í oss (Of Horses and Men)
2015	Þorsteinn Bachmann	Vonarstræti (Life in a Fishbowl)
2016	Sigurður Sigurjónsson	Hrútar (Rams)
2017	Blær Hinriksson	Hjartasteinn (Heartstone)
2018	Steinþór Hróar Steinþórsson	Undir trénu (Under the Tree)
2019	Gísli Örn Garðarsson	Vargur (Vultures)
2020	Ingvar Eggert Sigurðsson	Hvítur, Hvítur Dagur (A White, White Day)
2021	Ólafur Darri Ólafsson	Ráðherrann (The Minister)
2022	Hilmir Snær Guðnason	Dýrið (Lamb)
2023	Gísli Örn Garðarsson	Verbúðin (Blackport)
2024	Þröstur Leó Gunnarsson	Á ferð með mömmu (Driving Mum)
2025	Egill Ólafsson	Snerting (Touch)

Winners – Best Actress:

Year	Actress	Film
1999	Tinna Gunnlaugsdóttir	Ungfrúin góða og húsið (The Honour of the House)
2000	Björk	Dancer in the Dark
2001	Margrét Vilhjálmsdóttir	Mávahlátur (The Seagull's Laughter)
2002	Elva Ósk Ólafsdóttir	Hafið (The Sea)
2003	Sigurlaug Jónsdóttir	Stormviðri (Stormy Weather)
2007	Nanna Kristín Magnúsdóttir	Foreldrar (Parents)
2008	Sólveig Arnarsdóttir	Svartir englar
2010	Kristbjörg Kjeld	Mamma Gógó
2011	Nína Dögg Filippusdóttir	Brim (Undercurrent)
2012	Margrét Helga Jóhannsdóttir	Eldfjall (Volcano)
2013	Sara Dögg Ásgeirsdóttir	Pressa 3
2014	Thora Bjorg Helga	Málmhaus (Metalhead)
2015	Hera Hilmar	Vonarstræti (Life in a Fishbowl)
2016	Steinunn Ólína Þorsteinsdóttir	Réttur
2017	Hera Hilmar	Eiðurinn (The Oath)
2018	Edda Björgvinsdóttir	Undir trénu (Under the Tree)
2019	Halldóra Geirharðsdóttir	Kona fer í stríð (Woman at War)
2020	Katla M. Þorgeirsdóttir	Agnes Joy (Agnes Joy)
2021	Sigrún Edda Björnsdóttir	Gullregn (Gullregn)
2022	Jóhanna Friðrika Sæmundsdóttir	Systrabönd (Sisterhood)
2023	Nína Dögg Filippusdóttir	Verbúðin (Blackport)
2024	Kristbjörg Kjeld	Á ferð með mömmu (Driving Mum)
2025	Elín Hall	Ljósbrot (When The Light Breaks)

== 2004-2006 ==
Between 2004 and 2006, one award was given to the best actor/actress.

Winners:

Year	Actor	Film
2004	Ingvar Eggert Sigurðsson	Kaldaljós (Cold Light)
2005	Ilmur Kristjánsdóttir	Stelpurnar
2006	Ingvar Eggert Sigurðsson	Mýrin (Jar City)
