= 6th Edda Awards =

Icelandic film and television awards ceremony

The 6th Edda Awards were held on 14 November 2004 at Nordica Hótel in Reykjavík. The awards were hosted by actress/comedian Helga Braga Jónsdóttir and TV presenter Kristján Kristjánsson.

For the first time only one award was given for Best Actor and Actress as well as the Supporting Actor and Actress.

As in previous years the public was able to cast their votes online. The Icelandic Film and Television Academy had 70% say in the results and the public 30%. Except for the Best Television Personality where the public had 100% say in the results.

The film Kaldaljós, directed by Hilmar Oddson, was the winner of the evening taking five awards and receiving eight nominations. The Best Documentary category was interesting this year since two of the nominated films, Án Titils and Faux - í þessu máli, were about a high profile fraud case, where a great deal of paintings from Icelandic artists had been faked and sold. The goal was to make the court system change the laws on fraud of that kind since the laws were outdated and unclear.

Ingvar E. Sigurðsson and Ómar Ragnarsson both won their third Eddas on the night. Sigurðsson his third Best Actor award and Ragnarsson the award for Best Television Personality. He had previously won an award for Best News Anchor in 2001 and 2003.

== Returning categories ==
- Edda Award for Best Television Program (staged)

== Discontinued categories ==
- Edda Award For Best News Anchor

== New Categories ==
- Edda Award for Best Entertainment in Television

== Results ==
The nominees and winners were: (Winners highlighted in bold)

Best Film

- Dís, directed by Silja Hauksdóttir
- **Kaldaljós,** directed by Hilmar Oddsson
- Næsland, directed by eftir Friðrik Þór Friðriksson

Best Director

- Erla B. Skúladóttir, for Bjargvætturinn
- **Hilmar Oddsson**, for Kaldaljós
- Þorfinnur Guðnason, for Hestasaga

Best Actor/Actress

- Áslákur Ingvarsson, for Kaldaljós
- Brynja Þóra Guðnadóttir, for Salt
- **Ingvar E. Sigurðsson**, for Kaldaljós
- Jón Sigurbjörnsson, for Síðasti Bærinn
- Þröstur Leó Gunnarsson, for Vín Hússins

Best Supporting Actor/Actress

- Helga Braga Jónsdóttir, for Kaldaljós
- Ilmur Kristjánsdóttir, for Dís
- **Kristbjörg Kjeld**, for Kaldaljós
- Snæfríður Ingvarsdóttir, for Kaldaljós
- Þórunn Clausen, for Dís

Best Screenplay

- **Huldar Breiðfjörð**, for Næsland
- Jón Gnarr, for Með Mann á Bakinu
- Magnús Magnússon, for World of Solitude

Best Sound or Cinematography

- Steingrímur Þórðarson, for editing Sjálfstætt Fólk
- **Sigurður Sverrir Pálsson**, for cinematography in Kaldaljós
- Þorsteinn J. Vilhjálmsson, for overall presentation on the film Án Titils

Best Visual Design

- **Helga Rós Hannam**, for costuming in Svínasúpan
- Haukur Hauksson, for overall presentation Í Brennidepli
- Úlfur Karlsson, for set design in Anna Afastelpa

Best Documentary

- **Blindsker**, directed by Ólafur Jóhannesson
- Faux – Í þessu máli, directed by Sólveig Anspach
- Hestasaga, directed by Þorfinnur Guðnason
- Love is in the air, directed by Ragnar Bragason
- World of solitude, directed by Páll Steingrímsson

Best Short

- Bjargvættur, directed by Erla B. Skúladóttir
- Móðan, directed by Jón Karl Helgason
- Síðustu orð Hreggviðs, directed by Grímur Hákonarson
- '''**Síðasti Bærinn**, directed by Rúnar Rúnarsson
- Vín Hússins, directed by Örn Marinó Arnarson and Þorkel Harðarson

Best Television Program (staged)

- And Björk of Course, directed by Lárus Ýmir Óskarsson
- Mynd Fyrir Afa, directed by Tinna Gunnlaugsdóttir
- **Njálssaga**, directed by Björn Brynjúlfur Björnsson

Best Television Program

- **Sjálfstætt Fólk** – Stöð 2
- Í brennidepli – RÚV
- Fólk með Sirrý – Skjár 1

Best Entertainment in Television

- Idol-stjörnuleit – Stöð 2
- **Spaugstofan** **– RÚV**
- Svínasúpan – Stöð 2

Best Television Personality

- Ómar Ragnarsson - RÚV

Best Music Video

- Dúkkulísur - Sögustelpan, directed by Gunnar B. Guðmundsson og Stefán Benedikt Vilhelmsson
- **Bang Gang -** **Stop in the Name of Love**, directed by Ragnar Bragason
- María Mena - Just a Little Bit, directed by Ragnar Agnarsson

Honorary Award

- Páll Steingrímsson, film director, for a long and successful carrier in documentary film making, with focus on nature.
