= Cinema of Iceland =

- No. of screens: 38 (2010)
  - Per capita: 13.4 per 100,000 (2010)
- Main distributors: Samfilm 38.0% Sena 32.0% Myndform 29.0%

Produced feature films (2011)
- Fictional: 9
- Animated: 1
- Documentary: 3

Number of admissions (2011)
- Total: 1,514,000
  - Per capita: 5.4 (2010)

Gross box office (2011)
- Total: ISK 1.49 billion

Iceland has a notable cinema film industry, with many Icelandic actors and directors having gone on to receive international attention. The most famous film, and the only one to be nominated for an Academy Award for Best International Feature, is Börn náttúrunnar (Children of Nature), a 1991 film directed by Friðrik Þór Friðriksson. This brought Icelandic cinema to the international scene, which has since grown, with films such as Nói Albínói (Noi the Albino) by Dagur Kári, heralded as descendants of the Icelandic film tradition.

The annual Edda Awards are the national film awards of Iceland.

== Films ==
List of notable Icelandic films
Icelandic	English	Year	Director	Notes
Magnús	Magnús	1989	Þráinn Bertelsson	(Note: Nominated for the European Film Award for Best Film)
Börn náttúrunnar	Children of Nature	1991	Friðrik Þór Friðriksson	(Note: Nominated for the Academy Award for Best International Feature Film)
Ungfrúin góða og húsið	The Honour of the House	1999	Guðný Halldórsdóttir	(Note: Winner of the Edda Award for Best Film)
Englar alheimsins	Angels of the Universe	2000	Friðrik Þór Friðriksson	
Mávahlátur	The Seagull's Laughter	2001	Ágúst Guðmundsson	
Hafið	The Sea	2002	Baltasar Kormákur	
Nói albínói	Noi the Albino	2003	Dagur Kári	
Kaldaljós	Cold Light	2004	Hilmar Oddsson	
Fullorðið fólk	Dark Horse	2005	Dagur Kári	
Mýrin	Jar City	2006	Baltasar Kormákur	
Foreldrar	Parents	2007	Ragnar Bragason	
Sveitabrúðkaup	Country Wedding	2008	Valdís Óskarsdóttir	
Bjarnfreðarson	Mister Bjarnfreðarson	2010	Ragnar Bragason	
Brim	Undercurrent	2011	Árni Ólafur Ásgeirsson	
Eldfjall	Volcano	2011	Rúnar Rúnarsson	
Djúpið	The Deep	2012	Baltasar Kormákur	(Note: Shortlisted for the Academy Award for Best International Feature Film)
Hross í oss	Of Horses and Men	2013	Benedikt Erlingsson	
Vonarstræti	Life in a Fishbowl	2014	Baldvin Z	
Hrútar	Rams	2015	Grímur Hákonarson	
Hjartasteinn	Heartstone	2016	Guðmundur Arnar Guðmundsson	
Undir trénu	Under the Tree	2017	Hafsteinn Gunnar Sigurðsson	
Kona fer í stríð	Woman at War	2018	Benedikt Erlingsson	
Agnes Joy	Agnes Joy	2019	Silja Hauksdóttir	
Gullregn	The Garden	2020	Ragnar Bragason	
Dýrið	Lamb	2021	Valdimar Jóhannsson	
Volaða land	Godland	2022	Hlynur Pálmason	

== See also ==
- List of cinema industries by location
- Kvikmyndapod
