= 5th Edda Awards =

Icelandic film and television awards ceremony

The 5th Edda Awards were held on 10 October 2003 at Nordica Hótel in Reykjavík. The awards were hosted by TV presenters Eva María Jónsdóttir and Sverrir Þór Sverrisson (Sveppi). The latter was the previous year's Best Television Personality. 15 awards were given plus the Icelandic Film and Television Academy's Honorary Award.

The film Noi the Albino, directed by Dagur Kári, had the most nominations and wins, being nominated for ten awards and winning six.

== Discontinued awards ==
- Best Television Program (staged)

== Result ==
The nominees and winners were: (Winners highlighted in bold)

Best Film:

- **Noi the Albino**
- Stella í framboði
- Stormviðri

Best Director:

- **Dagur Kári Pétursson**, for Nói albínói
- Gunnar B. Guðmundsson, for Karamellumyndin
- Ólafur Sveinsson, for Hlemmur

Best Actor:

- Ólafur Darri Ólafsson, for the Short Film Fullt hús
- **Tómas Lemarquis**, for Nói albínói
- Þórhallur Sigurðsson (Laddi), for Stella í framboði

Best Actress:

- Edda Björgvinsdóttir, for Stella í framboði
- Elodie Bouchez, for Stormviðri
- **Sigurlaug (Didda) Jónsdóttir**, for Stormviðri

Best Supporting Actor:

- Hjalti Rögnvaldsson, for Nói albínói
- Þorsteinn Gunnarsson, for Nói albínói
- **Þröstur Leó Gunnarsson**, for Nói albínói

Best Supporting Actress:

- Anna Friðriksdóttir, for Nói albínói
- **Edda Heiðrún Backman**, for Áramótaskaupið 2002
- Elín Hansdóttir, for Nói albínói

Best Screenplay:

- **Dagur Kári Pétursson**, for Nói albínói
- Gunnar B. Guðmundsson, for Karamellumyndin
- Ólafur Sveinsson, for Hlemmur

Best Visual Design:

- Bjarki Rafn Guðmundsson, for special effects in Karamellumyndin
- **Jón Steinar Ragnarsson**, for set design in í Nói albínói
- Stígur Steinþórsson, for set design in Karamellumyndin

Best Sound or Cinematography:

- Jón Karl Helgason, for cinematography and editing in Mótmælandi Íslands
- Rasmus Videbæk, for cinematography in Nói albínói
- **Sigurrós**, for music in Hlemmur

Best Documentary:

- Á meðan land byggist
- Ég lifi – Vestmannaeyjagosið 1973
- **Hlemmur**
- Hrein og bein – sögur úr íslensku samfélagi
- Mótmælandi Íslands

Best Short Film:

- Burst
- **Karamellumyndin**
- Tíu Laxnesmyndir

Best Television Program:

- Áramótaskaupið 2002
- Fólk með Sirrý
- Laugardagskvöld með Gísla Marteini
- **Sjálfstætt fólk**
- Popppunktur
- Spaugstofan

Best News Anchor:

- Brynhildur Ólafsdóttir, for Stöð 2 News
- Egill Helgason, for Silfur Egils – Skjárinn
- **Ómar Ragnarsson**, for RÚV News

Best Music Video:

- Írafár - Allt sem ég sé, directed by Guðjón Jónsson
- Maus - Life in a Fish Bowl, directed by Björn og Börkur
- **Quarashi – Mess it Up**, directed by Gaukur Úlfarsson

Best Television Personality:

- **Gísli Marteinn Baldursson**

Honorary Award:

- **Knútur Hallsson**, former politician, for his contribution in Icelandic film affairs.
