= 7th Edda Awards =

Icelandic film and television awards ceremony

The 7th Edda Awards were held on 13 November 2005 at Nordica Hótel in Reykjavík. The Awards were hosted by actor Þorsteinn Guðmundsson and was broadcast live on RÚV.

As in previous years, the public was able to cast their votes online. The Icelandic Film and Television Academy had 70% say in the results and the public 30%. Except for the Best Television Personality where the public had 100% say in the results. This year a total of 53 people were nominated for Best Television Personality. This year also marked the first time the members of the academy were able to submit their votes online. This was done through a special email service.

The film Voksne Mennesker, directed by Dagur Kári was nominated in five categories and won 4 awards. Magnús Scheving's LazyTown was also nominated in 5 categories but only won one award. Silvía Night was prominent as always and did not shy away from the attention on the award night. She was nominated in two categories and won both. One of those awards was the Best Television Personality which was chosen online by the Icelandic public.

== New Categories ==
- Landsbankinn Motivation Award

== Results ==
The nominees and winners were: (Winners highlighted in bold)

Best Film

- One Point O, directed by Marteinn Þórsson & Jeff Renfroe
- Strákarnir okkar, directed by Róbert Ingi Douglas
- **Voksne Mennesker**, directed by Dagur Kári Pétursson

Best Director

- Ólafur Jóhannesson, for Africa United
- **Dagur Kári Pétursson**, for Voksne Mennesker
- Marteinn Þórsson & Jeff Renfroe, for One Point O

Best Actor/Actress

- Björn Hlynur Haraldsson, for Reykjavíkurnætur
- Guðlaug Elísabet Ólafsdóttir, for Stelpurnar
- **Ilmur Kristjánsdóttir**, for Stelpurnar
- Nicolas Bro, for Voksne Mennesker
- Þórunn Clausen, for Reykjavíkurnætur

Best Supporting Actor/Actress

- Helgi Björnsson, for Strákarnir okkar
- Jón Atli Jónasson, for Strákarnir okkar
- **Pálmi Gestsson**, for Áramótaskaupið
- Víkingur Kristjánsson, for Reykjavíkurnætur
- Þorsteinn Bachmann, for Strákarnir okkar

Best Screenplay

- Ólafur Jóhannesson, for Africa United
- **Dagur Kári Pétursson & Rune Schjott**, for Voksne Mennesker
- Mark Velenti & Magnús Scheving, for LazyTown

Best Documentary

- Rithöfundur með myndavél
- Ragnar í Smára
- **Africa United**
- Undir stjörnuhimni
- Gargandi snilld

Best Short

- **Töframaðurinn**
- Þröng sýn
- Ég missti næstum vitið

Best Editing or Cinematography

- **Bergsteinn Björgúlfsson**, for cinematography in Gargandi Snilld
- Sveinn M. Sveinsson & Ragnar Axelsson, for cinematography in Heimur kuldans
- Tómas Örn Tómasson, for cinematography in LazyTown

Best Visual Design

- Eggert Ketilsson, for set design in One Point O
- Magnús Scheving & Guðmundur Þór Kárason, for puppeteering in LazyTown
- María Ólafsdóttir & Guðrún Lárusdóttir for costuming in LazyTown

Best Sound & Music

- Bradley L. North, Byron Wilson, Ann Scibelli, for sound in One Point O
- Slow Slow, for music in Voksne Mennesker
- Hallur Ingólfsson, for music in Töframaðurinn

Best Television Program (staged)

- LazyTown
- Stelpurnar
- Danskeppnin

Best Entertainment in Television

- Idol – Stjörnuleit II (Idol Starsearch)
- **Sjáumst með Silvíu Nótt**
- Það var lagið

Best Television Program

- Fólk með Sirrý
- Í brennidepli
- **Sjálfstætt fólk**
- Einu sinni var...
- Útlínur

Best Music Video

- Leaves - Whatever, directed by Gísli Darri Halldórsson
- Bang Gang - Find What You Get, directed by Árni Þór Jónsson
- **70mínútur vs Quarashi** - Crazy Bastard, directed by Sam&Gun

Best Television Personality

- Arnar Björnsson
- Arnar Gauti
- Auddi (Auðunn Blöndal)
- Birta (Þóra Sigurðardóttir)
- Bjarni Þór Grétarsson
- Brynhildur Ólafsdóttir
- Brynja Þorgeirsdóttir
- Bubbi Morthens
- Edda Andrésdóttir
- Egill Helgason
- Elín Hirst
- Elín María Björnsdóttir
- Eva María Jónsdóttir
- Eyrún Magnúsdóttir
- Felix Bergsson
- Gísli Einarsson
- Guðjón Guðmundsson
- Guðmundur Steingrímsson
- Guðni Bergsson
- Hálfdán Steinþórsson
- Heiðar Jónsson
- Heimir Karlsson
- Hemmi Gunn (Hermann Gunnarsson)
- Hörður Magnússon
- Inga Lind Karlsdóttir
- Jóhanna Vigdís Hjaltadóttir
- Jóhanna Vilhjálmsdóttir
- Jói (Jóhannes Ásbjörnsson)
- Jón Ársæll Þórðarsson
- Jónatan Garðarsson
- Kristján Kristjánsson
- Magga Stína
- Margrét Sigfúsdóttir
- Nadia Banine
- Ómar Ragnarsson
- Páll Magnússon
- Pétur Jóhann Sigfússon
- Ragnhildur Steinunn Jónsdóttir
- Reynir Hjálmarsson
- Siggi Stormur (Sigurður Ragnarsson)
- Sigmar Guðmundsson
- **Silvía Nótt**
- Simmi (Sigmar Vilhjálmsson)
- Sirrý (Sigríður Arnardóttir)
- Svanhildur Hólm
- Svavar Örn Svavarsson
- Sveppi (Sverrir Þór Sverrisson)
- Valdimar Örn Flygenring
- Vala Matt (Valgerður Matthíasdóttur)
- Villi Naglbítur (Vilhelm Anton Jónsson)
- Þóra Tómasdóttir
- Þórhallur Gunnarsson
- Þórunn Högna

Landsbankinn Motivation Award

- Elvar Gunnarson and his shortfilm Hið ljúfa líf

Honorary Award

Vilhjálmur Hjálmarsson, a former politician on the board of education, for hiss efforts in creating the Icelandic film fund in 1978.
