= 2nd Edda Awards =

Icelandic film and television awards ceremony

The 2nd Edda Awards were held on 19 November 2000 at the National Theatre of Iceland. The awards were hosted by actress Steinunn Ólína Þorsteinsdóttir and TV presenter Jón Ársæll Þórðarson. The awards were broadcast live on RÚV.

The public could cast their vote online on the Icelandic news website Morgunblaðið. Public votes had 30% say in the results, and the academy the other 70%. The public was also able to vote for "Best Television Personality" and their vote had 100% say in the result.

The film Angels of the Universe (Englar alheimsins), based on the novel by Einar Már Guðmundsson, received most nominations. It received eight nominations and won seven awards.

== Ratings ==
A Gallup poll took place on request from The Icelandic Film and Television Academy. The result showed that 65% of the Icelandic people tuned in to watch the live broadcast and 86% of those asked were satisfied with the show.

== New Categories ==
- Edda Award for Best Supporting Actor
- Edda Award for Best Supporting Actress
- Edda Award for Best Television Personality

== Results ==
The nominees and winners were:

Best Film	Best Director
Englar alheimsins (Angels of the Universe); 101 Reykjavík; Íslenski draumurinn (The Icelandic Dream)	Friðrik Þór Friðriksson - Englar alheimsins (Angels of the Universe); Baltasar Kormákur - 101 Reykjavík; Óskar Jónasson - Úr öskunni í eldinn
Best Actor	Best Actress
Ingvar Eggert Sigurðsson - Englar alheimsins (Angels of the Universe); Hilmir Snær Guðnason - 101 Reykjavík; Þórhallur Sverrisson - Íslenski draumurinn (The Icelandic Dream)	Björk Guðmundsdóttir - Dancer in the Dark as Selma Ježková; Hanna María Karlsdóttir - 101 Reykjavík as Berglind; Victoria Abril - 101 Reykjavík as Lola
Best Supporting Actor	Best Supporting Actress
Björn Jörundur Friðbjörnsson - Englar alheimsins (Angels of the Universe) as Viktor; Baltasar Kormákur - Englar alheimsins (Angels of the Universe) as Óli; Jón Gnarr - Íslenski draumurinn (The Icelandic Dream) as Valli	Margrét Helga Jóhannsdóttir - Englar alheimsins (Angels of the Universe); Kristbjörg Kjeld - Fíaskó (Fiasco) as Helga; Laufey Brá Jónsdóttir - Íslenski draumurinn (The Icelandic Dream)
Best Documentary	Best Television Program
Síðasti valsinn; Staðarákvörðun óþekkt; Erró – norður, suður, austur, vestur	Silfur Egils; Ísland í bítið; Pétur og Páll
Best Television Program (Staged)	Best Television Personality
Fóstbræður (Blood brothers); Úr öskunni í eldinn; Ormstunga – ástarsaga	Erpur Eyvindarson - Johnny National on Skjárinn

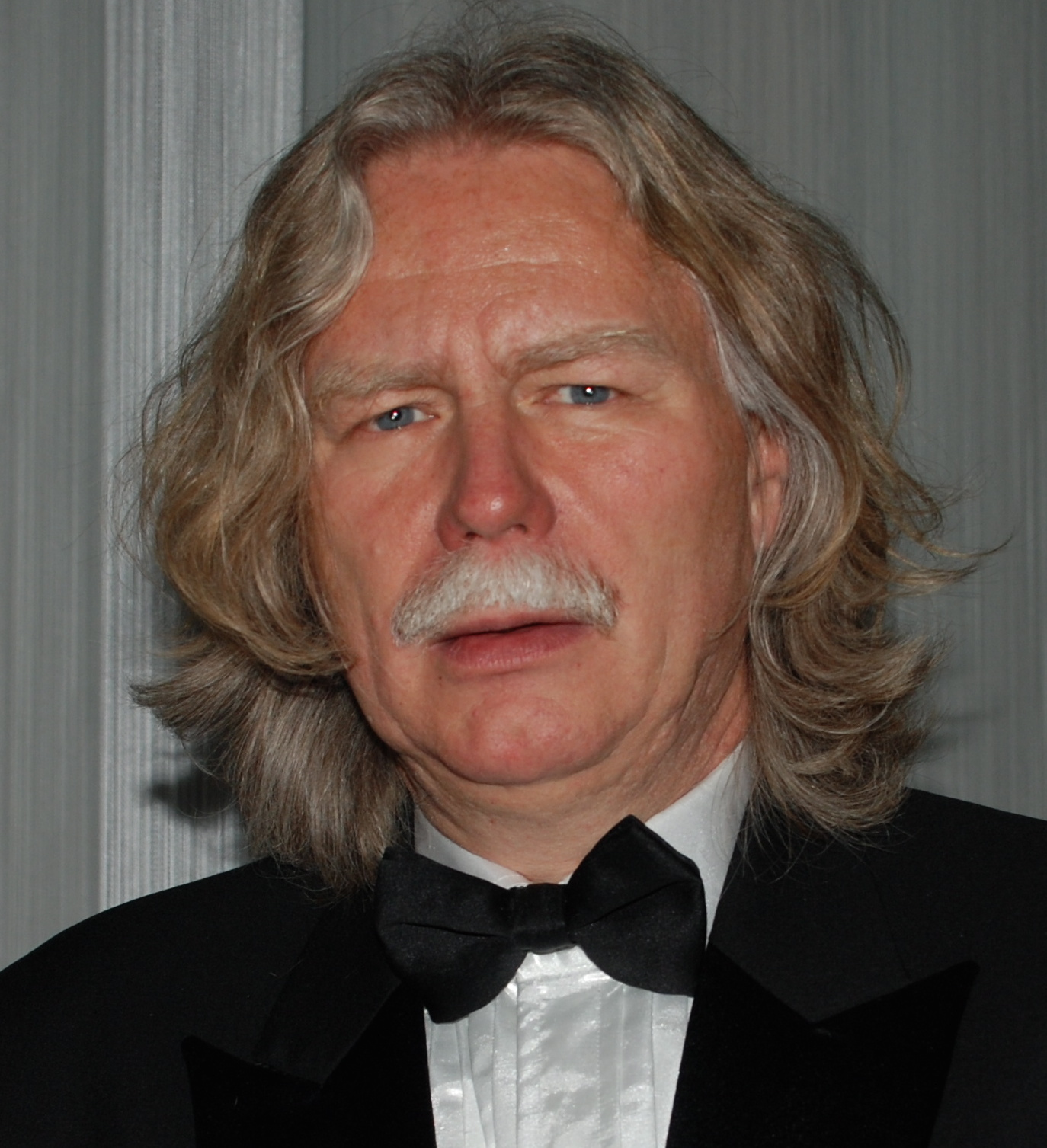
Best Director: Friðrik Þór Friðriksson

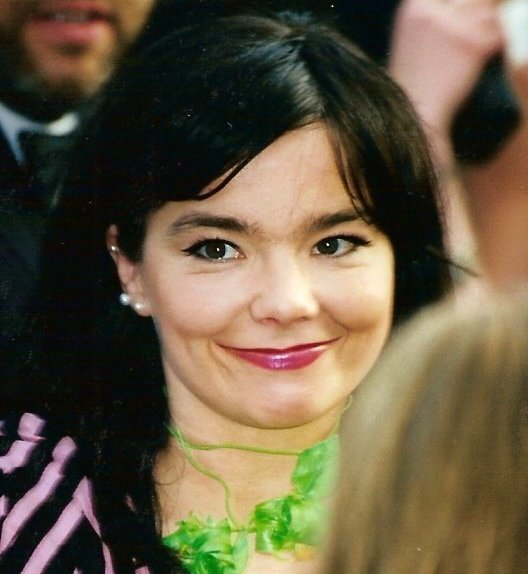
Best Actress: Björk

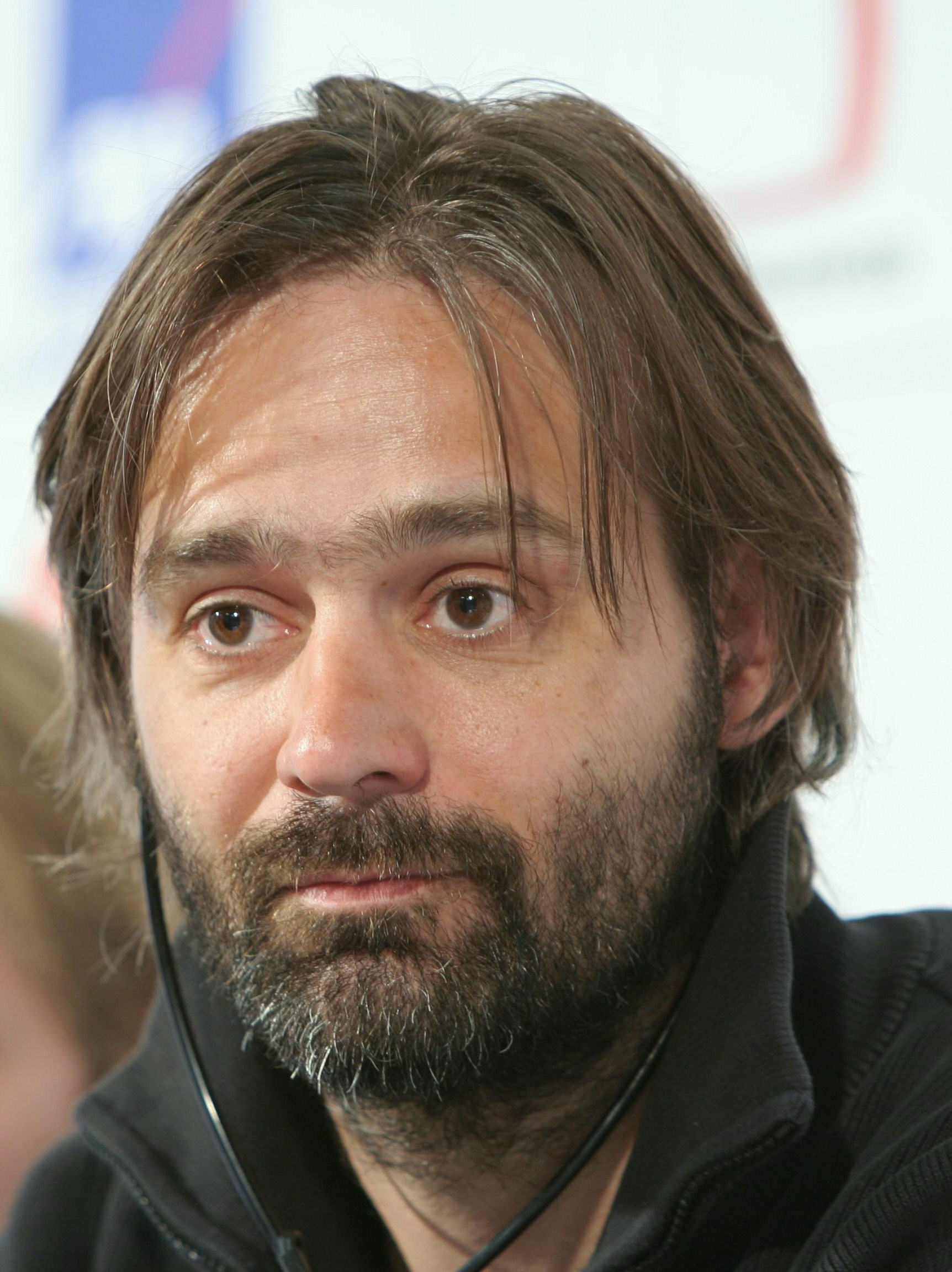
ÍKSA Professional Awards: Baltasar Kormákur

Honorary Award:

- Þorgeir Þorgeirson, filmmaker, author and translator

ÍKSA Professional Awards:

- Kjartan Kjartansson,'' for sound design in Englar alheimsins, 101 Reykjavík, Fíaskó and Myrkrahöfðinginn
- Baltasar Kormákur - screenplay in 101 Reykjavík
- Sigur Rós and Hilmar Örn Hilmarsson for music í Englar alheimsins
