= 4th Edda Awards =

Icelandic film and television awards ceremony

The 4th Edda Awards were held on 10 November 2002 in the National Theater of Iceland in Reykjavík. The awards were hosted by TV presenters Valgerður Matthíasdóttir and the previous year's Best Television Personality Logi Bergmann Eiðsson.

The Professional Awards were divided into three categories (Screenplay, Visual Design and Sound and Cinematography). Short films got their own category as well. As in previous years the public was able to cast their votes online. The Icelandic Film and Television Academy had 70% say in the results and the public 30%. Except for the Best Television Personality where the public had 100% say in the results. Around 800 people cast their votes online up to the awards.

The film Hafið, directed by Baltasar Kormákur received most nominations. The film was nominated for twelve awards in nine categories and won eight. Kormákur personally won two of those awards for directing and screenwriting. He dedicated his Best Film award to the National Theater of Iceland with these words: "Án leikhússins væri kvikmyndagerðin fátækari" ("Without this theater filmmaking would be poor"). And that it pleased him to see so many great actors who had worked in the theater receive their awards that evening.

Another interesting film among the critics was the animated children's film Litla lirfan ljóta, which was nominated in two categories and won one award.

Best Actor Gunnar Eyjólfsson was away with the Icelandic national chess team in Slovenia on the night of the ceremony, and accepted his award through Kormákur's mobilephone to great amusement.

== New categories ==
- Edda Award for Best Visual Design
- Edda Award for Best Sound and Cinema Photography
- Edda Award for Best Short Film
- Edda Award for Best Music Video

== Results ==
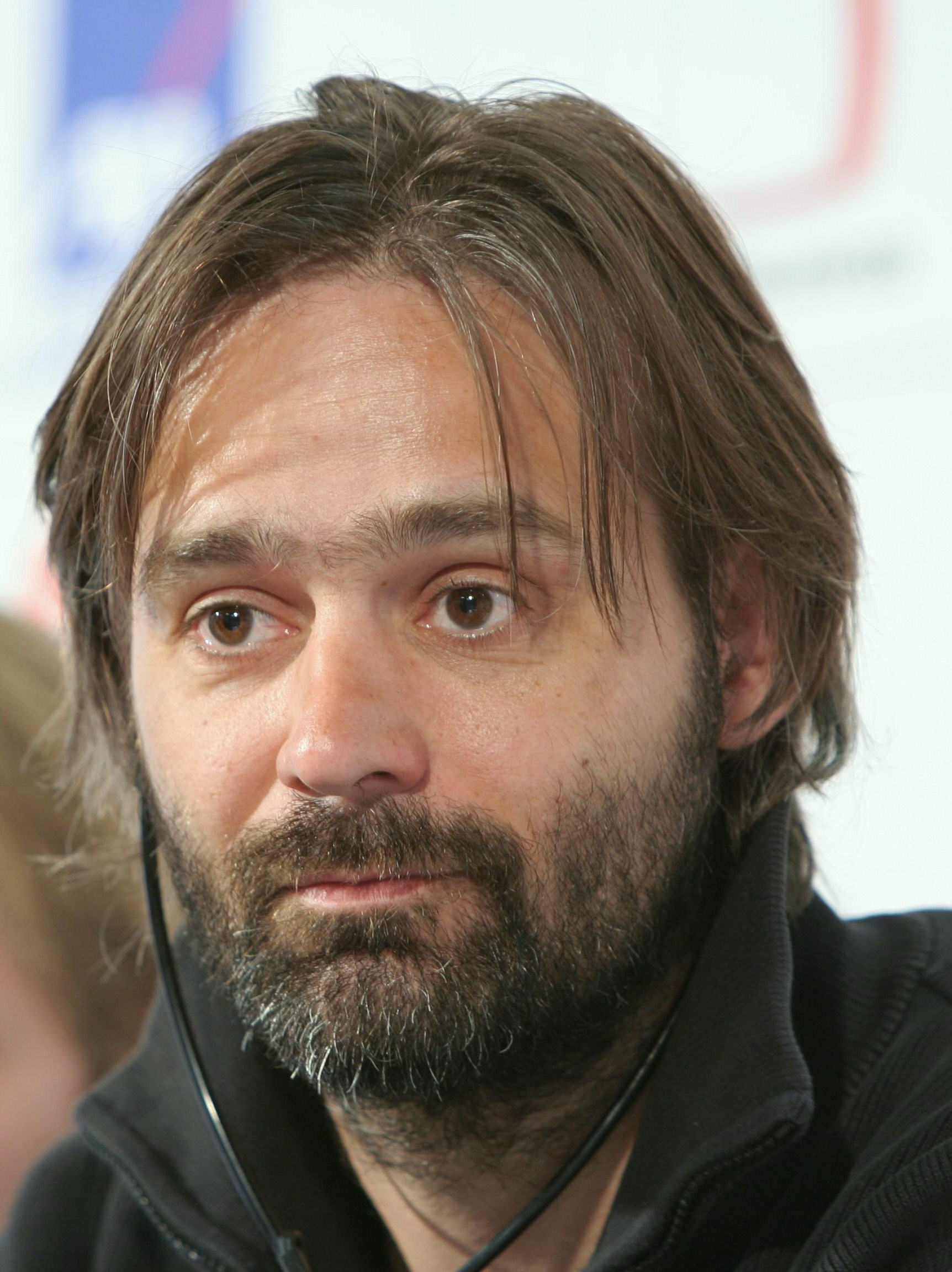
Best Director and Best Screenplay: Baltasar Kormákur

The nominees and winners were: (Winners highlighted in bold)

Best Film:

- Fálkar, directed by Friðrik Þór Friðriksson
- **Hafið,** directed by Baltasar Kormákur
- Regína, directed by María Sigurðardóttir

Best Director:

- **Baltasar Kormákur**, for Hafið
- Gunnar Karlsson, for Litla lirfan ljóta
- Óskar Jónasson, for 20/20 og Áramótaskaupið 2001

Best Actor:

- **Gunnar Eyjólfsson**, for Hafið
- Hilmir Snær Guðnason, for Hafið and Reykjavík Guesthouse Rent a Bike
- Keith Carradine, for Fálkar

Best Actress:

- **Elva Ósk Ólafsdóttir**, for Hafið
- Guðrún S. Gísladóttir, for Hafið
- Halldóra Geirharðsdóttir, for Regína

Best Supporting Actor:

- Jón Sigurbjörnsson, for 20/20
- **Sigurður Skúlason**, for Hafið and Gemsar
- Þorsteinn Guðmundsson, for Maður eins og ég

Best Supporting Actress:

- **Herdís Þorvaldsdóttir**, for Hafið
- Kristbjörg Kjeld, for Hafið
- Sólveig Arnarsdóttir, for Regína

Best Screenplay:

- **Baltasar Kormákur** and **Ólafur Haukur Símonarson**, for Hafið
- Árni Óli Ásgeirsson and Róbert Douglas, for Maður eins og ég
- Árni Þórarinsson and Páll Pálsson, for 20/20

Best Sound and Cinema Photography:

- Harald Paalgarrd, for cinema photography in Fálkar
- Sigurður Sverrir Pálsson, for cinema photography in Málarinn og sálmurinn hans um litinn
- **Valdís Óskarsdóttir**, for editing in Hafið

Best Visual Design:

- Ásta Ríkharðsdóttir, for set design in Hvernig sem við reynum and Allir hlutir fallegir
- **Gunnar Karlsson**, for creative direction in Litla lirfan ljóta
- Tonie Jan Zetterström, for set design in Hafið

Best Documentary:

- Tyrkjaránið
- Hver hengir upp þvottinn?
- Noi, Pam og mennirnir þeirra
- Möhöguleikar
- **Í skóm drekans**

Best television program (staged):

- **Áramótaskaupið 2001**
- Í faðmi hafsins
- 20/20

Best Television Program:

- Sjálfstætt fólk
- HM 4-4-2
- **Af fingrum fram**
- Fólk með Sirrý
- Ísland í bítið

Best News Anchor:

- **Árni Snævarr,** for Stöð 2 News
- Brynhildur Ólafsdóttir, for Stöð 2 News
- G. Pétur Mattíasson, for RÚV News

Best Short Film:

- **Litla lirfan ljóta**
- Memphis

Best Music Video:

- Land & synir – If, directed by Samúel Bjarki Pétursson and Gunnar Páll Ólafsson
- **Sálin hans Jóns míns** – **Á nýjum stað**, directed by Samúel Bjarki Pétursson and Gunnar Páll Ólafsson
- Stuðmenn - Hvernig sem ég reyni, directed by Ragnar Bragason

Best Television Personality:

- **Sverrir Sverrisson** **(Sveppi)**

Honorary Award:

- Magnús Magnússon, for a 40-year career in television.
