= 3rd Edda Awards =

Icelandic film and television awards ceremony

The 3rd Edda Awards were held on 11 November 2001 at Broadway Night Club in Reykjavík. The awards were hosted by actress Edda Heiðrún Backman and singer Valgeir Guðjónsson. The show was broadcast live on RÚV.

Short films were also included for the first time in the Best television program (staged). As in the previous awards the public was given the right to vote online in all categories. The academy had 70% say in the results and the public 30%. Except for the Best Television Personality which the public had 100% say in the results.

The film Mávahlátur received most nominations, ten in all, and won six awards.

== New Categories ==
- Edda Award for Best Screenplay
- Edda Award for Best News Anchor

== Results ==
The nominees and winners were: (Winners highlighted in bold)

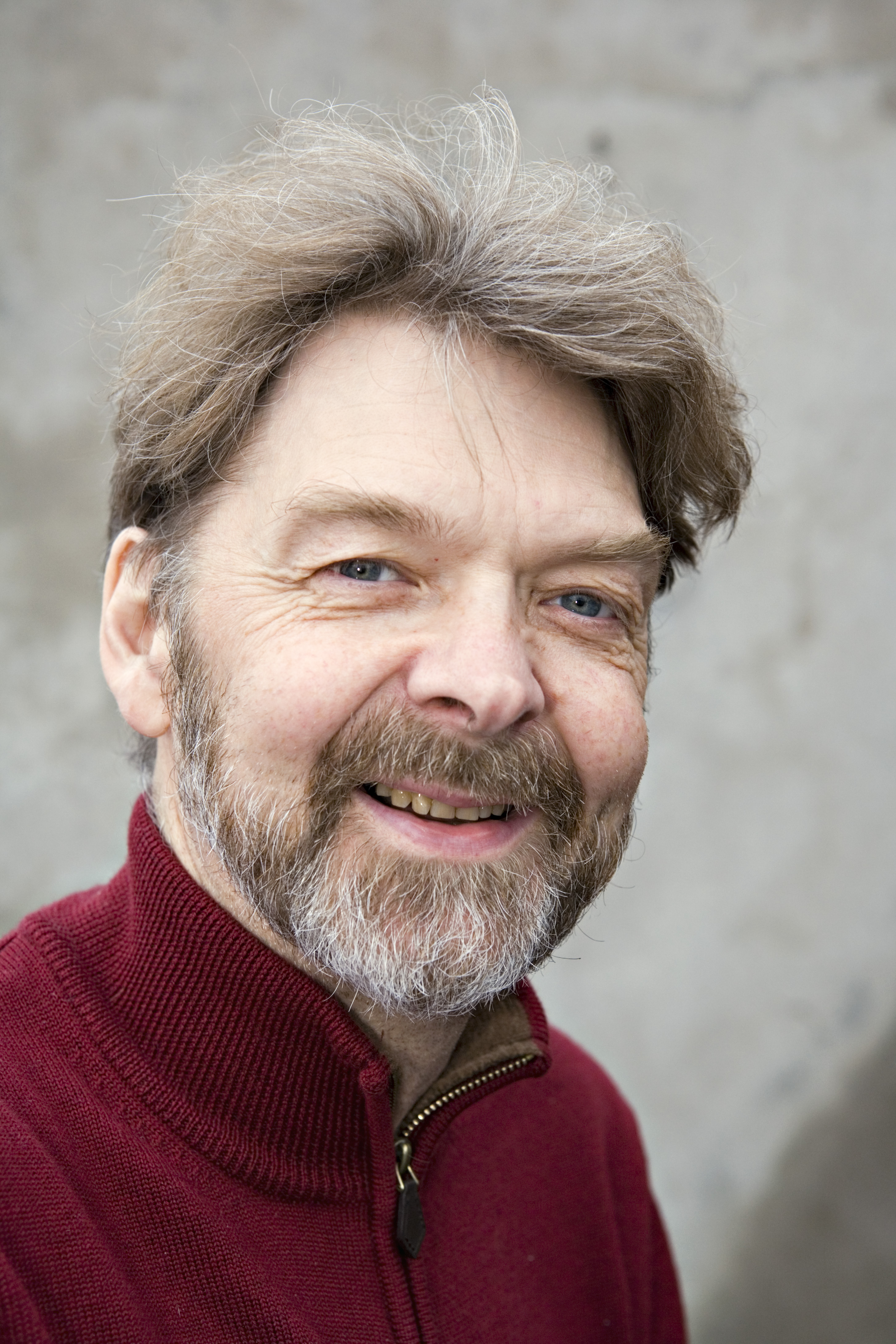
Best Director and Best Screenplay: Ágúst Guðmundsson

Best Film:

- Íkingút
- **Mávahlátur**
- Villiljós

Best Director:

- **Ágúst Guðmundsson**, for Mávahlátur
- Gísli Snær Erlingsson, for Íkingút
- Ragnar Bragason, for Fóstbræður

Best Actor:

- Hjalti Rúnar Jónsson, for Íkingút
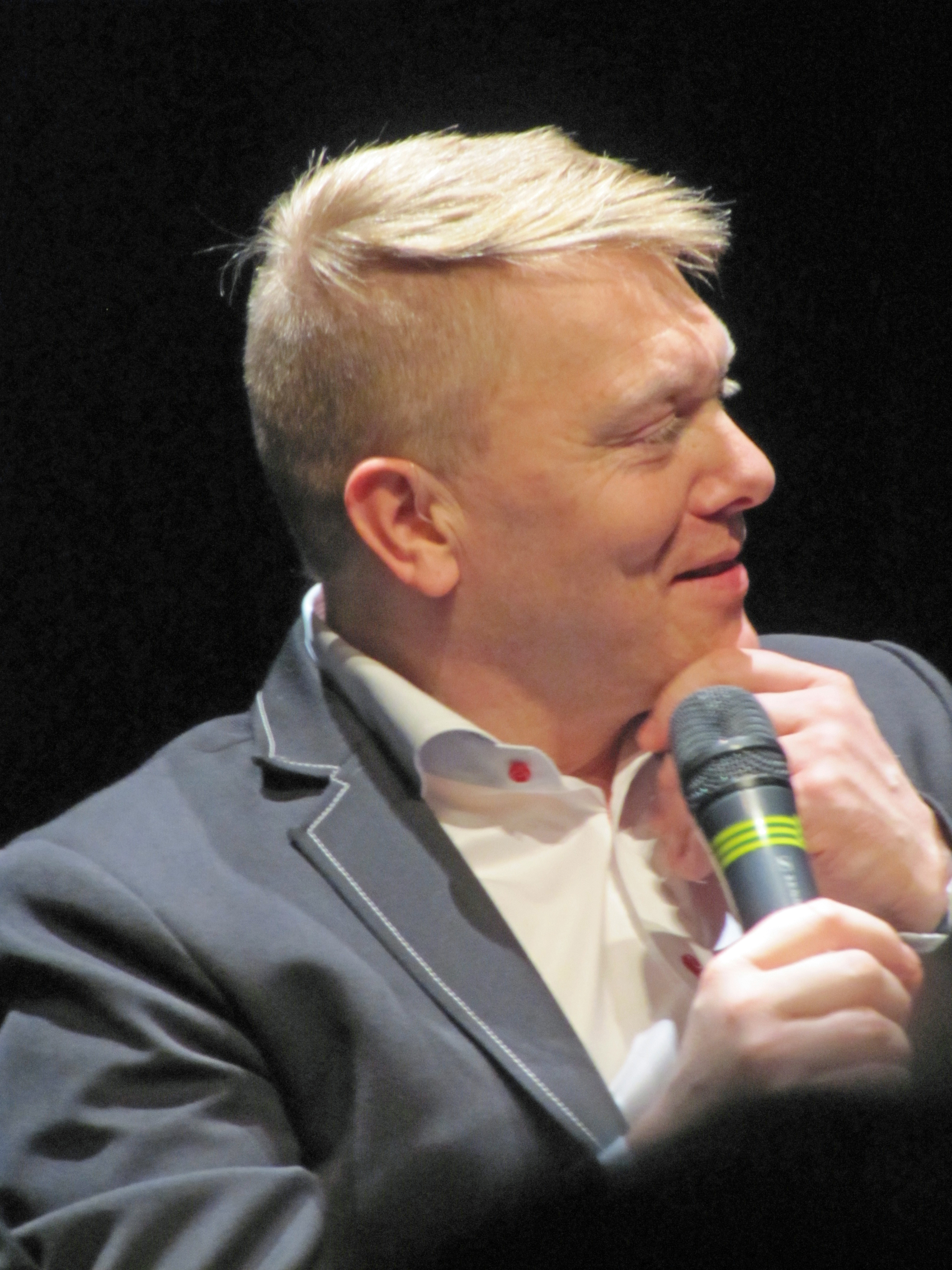
- Best Actor: Jón Gnarr
  **Jón Gnarr**, for Fóstbræður
- Pálmi Gestsson, for Íkingút

Best Actress:

- Halldóra Geirharðsdóttir, for Þá yrði líklega farin af mér feimni
- **Margrét Vilhjálmsdóttir**, forMávahlátur
- Ugla Egilsdóttir, for Mávahlátur

Best Supporting Actor:

- Björn J. Friðbjörnsson, for Villiljós
- Eyvindur Erlendsson, for Mávahlátur
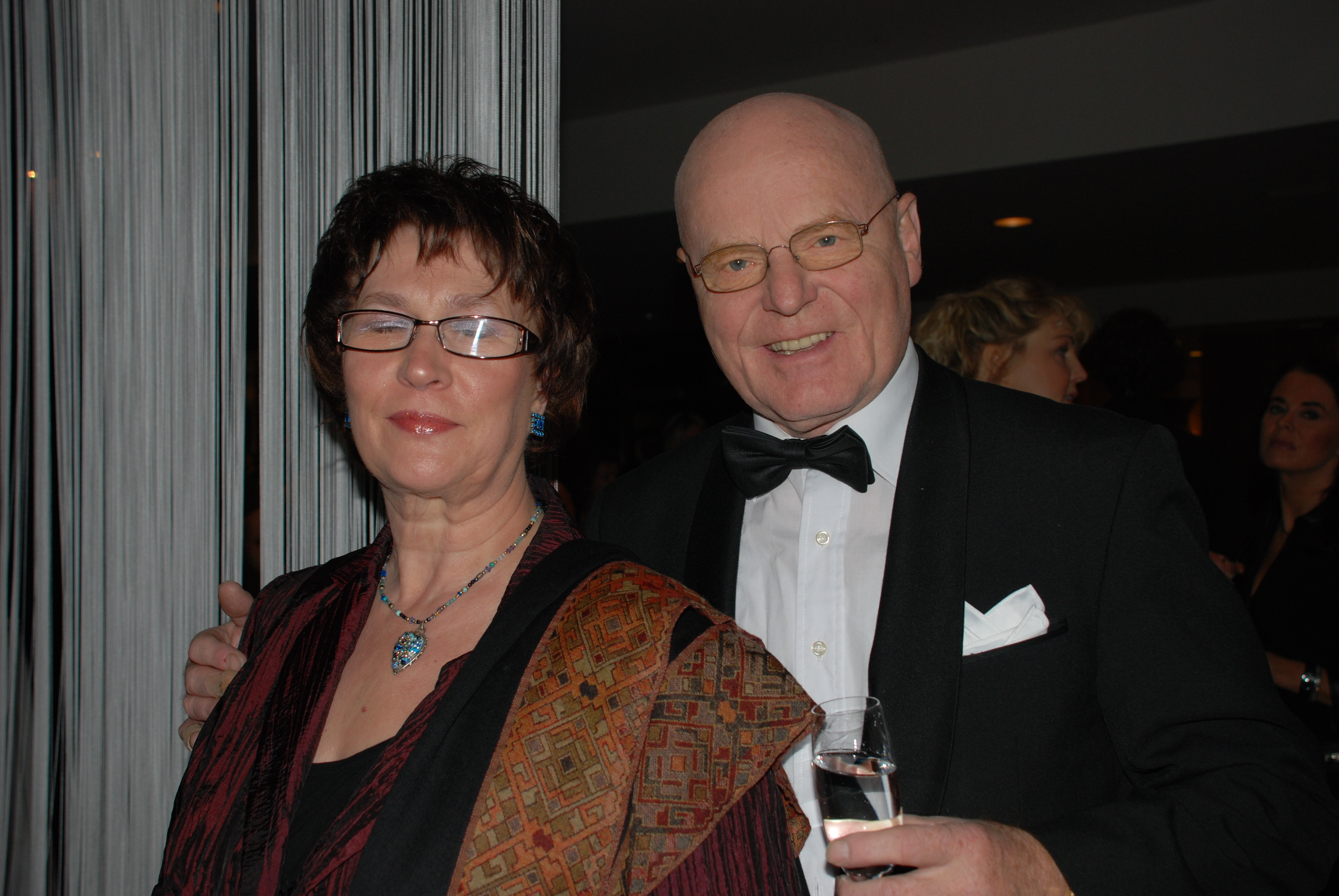
- Best News Anchor: Ómar Ragnarsson (pictured here with his wife in 2007.
  **Hilmir Snær Guðnason**, for Mávahlátur

Best Supporting Actress:

- Halldóra Geirharðsdóttir, for Mávahlátur
- **Kristbjörg Kjeld**, for Mávahlátur
- Sigurveig Jónsdóttir, for Mávahlátur

Best Screenplay:

- **Ágúst Guðmundsson**, for Mávahlátur
- Huldar Breiðfjörð, for Villiljós
- Jón Steinar Ragnarsson, for Íkingút

Best Documentary:

- Braggabúar
- Fiðlan
- **Lalli Johns**

Best Television Program (staged)/ Shortfilm:

- **Fóstbræður**
- Krossgötur
- Þá yrði líklega farin af mér feimni

Best Television Program:

- **Mósaík**
- Ok
- Tantra – Listin að elska meðvitað

Best News Anchor:

- Árni Snævarr, for Stöð 2 News
- Eva Bergþóra Guðbergsdóttir, for Stöð 2 News
- **Ómar Ragnarsson**, for RÚV News

Best Television Personality:

- **Logi Bergmann Eiðsson**

ÍKSA Professional Awards:

- **Hrönn Kristinsdóttir**, for producing Ikingut
- **Þorfinnur Guðnason**, for editing Lalli Johns
- **Páll Baldvin Baldvinsson**, for producing Tuttugasta öldin

Honorary Award:

- **Gunnar Eyjólfsson** and **Kristbjörg Kjeld**, actors, for their contribution to Icelandic television and cinema.
