= 1st Edda Awards =

Icelandic film and television awards ceremony

The 1st Edda Awards ceremony was held on 15. November 1999 by the Icelandic Film and Television Academy (ÍKSA). The awards were held at the Reykjavík City Theatre in Reykjavík, and were hosted by Þorfinnur Ómarsson, director of the Icelandic Film Fund. Awards were given in eight categories, plus one Honorary Award given for special contribution to the Icelandic film industry. Ungfrúin góða og húsið (The Honour of the House), based on the novel by Halldór Laxness, received five nominations, The film ended up winning two awards, for Best Film and Best Director.

The public could cast their vote online on the Icelandic news website, Morgunblaðið. Public votes had 30% say in the results, and the academy the other 70%. The awards were broadcast live on Stöð 2.

== Results ==
The nominees and winners were:

Best Film	Best Director
Ungfrúin góða og húsið (The Honour of the House); Dansinn (The Dance); Sporlaust	Guðný Halldórsdóttir - Ungfrúin góða og húsið (The Honour of the House); Ágúst Guðmundsson - Dansinn (The Dance); Viðar Víkingsson - SÍS, ris, veldi og fall
Best Actor	Best Actress
Ingvar Eggert Sigurðsson - Slurpurinn og co; Hjalti Rögnvaldsson - Heimsókn; Dofri Hermannsson - Dansinn (The Dance) as Haraldur	Tinna Gunnlaugsdóttir - Ungfrúin góða og húsið (The Honour of the House) as Þuríður; Nanna Kristín Magnúsdóttir - Sporlaust; María Ellingsen - Dómsdagur
Best Documentary	Best Television Program (Staged)
Sönn Íslensk sakamál; Corpus Camera; SÍS, ris, veldi og fall	Fóstbræður (Blood brothers); Slurpinn og co; Heimsókn
Best Television Program
Stutt í spunann; Þetta helst; Stundin okkar

ÍKSA Professional Awards:

- Ragna Fossberg, for makeup in Dómsdagur and Ungfrúin góða og húsið (The Honour of the House)
- Hilmar Örn Hilmarsson, for music in Ungfrúin góða og húsið (The Honour of the House)
- Þórunn María Jónsdóttir, for costumes in Dansinn (The Dance)
