= Edda Award for Best Television Personality =

Annual Icelandic television award

Edda Award for Best Television Personality (Icelandic: Sjónvarpsmaður ársins) is an award at the Icelandic Film and Television Awards (Edda Awards). The award was first presented at the 2nd Edda Awards in 2000 and has been a part of the awards every year since. The result is decided by the Icelandic public, which is able to vote for their favorite person on television online in a small time period up to the awards. In recent years the award has become highly sought after by the television nominees and they can be quite competitive towards one another up to the award ceremony.

== Recipients ==
Year	Winner
2000	Erpur Eyvindarson
2001	Logi Bergmann Eiðsson
2002	Sveppi
2003	Gísli Marteinn Baldursson
2004	Ómar Ragnarsson
2005	Silvía Night (Silvía Nótt)
2006	Ómar Ragnarsson
2007	Egill Helgason
2008	Egill Helgason
2010	Thóra Arnórsdóttir
2011	Gísli Einarsson
2012	Jóhannes Kr. Kristjánsson
2013	Björn Bragi Arnarsson
2014	Bogi Ágústsson
2015	Brynja Þorgeirsdóttir
