= Þorsteinn Gunnarsson =

Icelandic actor and architect (born 1940)

- Born: 1940 (age 85–86)
- Occupations: actor, architect
- Years active: 1984–2025
- Known for: Eirikur, Icelandic TV-series Trapped.
- Notable work: restoring several Icelandic churches

Þorsteinn Gunnarsson (born December 18 1940) is an Icelandic actor and architect. He is known for his role as Eirikur in the Icelandic TV-series Trapped. In 2003 he was nominated for an Edda Award for his role in Nói Albinói.

== Selected filmography ==
- Hrafninn flýgur (1984)
- Foxtrot (1988)
- Áramótaskaup 1990 (1990) as various roles
- Pippi on the Run (1993) (Icelandic dubbing)
- Nói Albinói (2003) as Headmaster Þórarinn
- Dís (2004) as Magga's Father
- Mýrin (2006) as Holberg
- Sumarlandið (2010)
- Fúsi (2015)
- Bakk (2015)
- Grafir & Bein (2016)
- Trapped (2015-2016; TV-series) as Eiríkur
- Reykjavik Fusion (2025)

== Personal life ==
Þorsteinn has worked as an architect involved in restoring several Icelandic churches.
