= Zik Zak Filmworks =

Icelandic film production company

- Industry: Film production
- Founded: 1995; 31 years ago
- Founders: Skúli Fr. Malmquist; Thorir S. Sigurjonsson
- Headquarters: Reykjavík, Iceland

Zik Zak Filmworks is an Icelandic film production company based in Reykjavík. The company was founded in 1995 by Skúli Fr. Malmquist and Thorir S. Sigurjonsson. It produces feature films, documentaries, and shorts.

== Filmography ==
- Last and First Men (2020)
- Óskin
- Pabbahelgar
- The Professor and the Madman
- To Plant a Flag
- And Breathe Normally
- I Remember You
- Búi
- Cubs
- The Together Project
- Z for Zachariah
- Paris of the North
- Harry & Heimir: First time Is Murder
- Megaphone 16 years til summer
- Black's Game
- Babybird, Unborn
- Volcano
- Gauragangur
- Undercurrent
- The Good Heart
- Electronica Reykjavik
- Skrapp út
- Misty Mountain
- Thanks
- Skröltormar
- The Boss of It All
- The Last Winter
- Dark Horse
- Screaming Masterpiece
- The Last Farm
- Niceland (Population. 1.000.002)
- Silny Kafe
- Jargo
- Noi the Albino
- Gemsar
- Dramarama
- Fíaskó

== See also ==
- Antidote Films
- Glass Eye Pix
- Dagur Kári
- Friðrik Þór Friðriksson
- Sólveig Anspach
