= Andri Steinn =

Icelandic film editor (born 1979)

Andri Steinn Guðjónsson (born March 12, 1979, in Reykjavík, Iceland) is an Icelandic film editor.

== Films ==
The year of release and director of each film are indicated in parentheses.

- Familien Gregersen (2004 – Charlotte Sachs Bostrup) (co-editor)
- Æblet & ormen (2009 – Anders Morgenthaler and Mads Juul)
- The Good Heart (2010 Dagur Kári)
- Submarino (2010 – Thomas Vinterberg)
- Min bedste fjende (2010 – Oliver Ussing)
- Truth About Men (2010 – Nikolaj Arcel)
- Virgin Mountain (2015 - Dagur Kári)
- Welcome to Utmark (2021 - Dagur Kári)
- Chosen (2022 - Kaspar Munk)
- Beautiful Beings (2022 - Guðmundur Arnar Guðmundsson)
- Trom (2022)
- Borgen (2022)
