= Dramarama (2001 film) =

2001 anthology film by 5 different directors

- Directed by: Inga Lísa Middleton; Dagur Kári; Ragnar Bragason; Ásgrímur Sverrisson; Einar Thór Gunnlaugsson
- Written by: Huldar Breiðfjörð
- Produced by: Skúli Fr. Malmquist; Þórir S. Sigurjónsson
- Cinematography: Ágúst Jakobsson
- Edited by: Sigvaldi J. Kárason
- Music by: Valgeir Sigurðsson
- Production company: Zik Zak Filmworks
- Release date: 19 January 2001
- Running time: 80 minutes
- Country: Iceland
- Language: Icelandic

Dramarama (Icelandic: Villiljós) is a 2001 Icelandic comedy-drama film directed by Inga Lísa Middleton, Dagur Kári, Ragnar Bragason, Ásgrímur Sverrisson and Einar Thór Gunnlaugsson. It consists of five intertwined episodes, each made by a different director, set in Reykjavík during a power outage. The stories focus on a blind man, a pregnant girl, the driver of a hearse, two recently engaged lovers and a rock band. The film was produced by Zik Zak Filmworks with support from the Icelandic Film Fund.

The film was released in Iceland on 19 January 2001. It was nominated for the Edda Award for best film, screenplay and supporting actor (Björn J. Friðbjörnsson).

== Segments ==
- "Aumingjaskápurinn" - directed by Ragnar Bragason
- "Líkið í lestinni" - directed by Dagur Kári
- "Mömmuklúbburinn" - directed by Inga Lísa Middleton
- "Heimsyfirráð eða bleyjuskiptingar" - directed by Ásgrímur Sverrisson
- "Guð hrapar úr vélinni" - directed by Einar Thor Gunnlaugsson

== Cast ==
- Björn J. Friðbjörnsson as Ívar
- Inga Maria Valdimarsdóttir as Ívar's girlfriend
- Henrik Baldvin Björnsson as the ghost
- Megas as the voice of conscience
- Ingvar Eggert Sigurðsson as Sölvi
- Hafdís Huld as Silja
- Álfrún Örnólfsdóttir as Tóta
- Guðrún María Bjarnadóttir as Birna
- Ragnheiður Steindórsdóttir as Steinka
- Guðrún Gísladóttir as Tóta's mother
- Ari Gunnar Þorsteinsson as Tóta's brother
- Edda Björgvinsdóttir as Hanna
- Eggert Þorleifsson as Albert
