= Cold Trail =

- Original title: Köld slóð
- Directed by: Birni Brynjúlfi Björnssyni
- Starring: Þröstur Leó Gunnarsson; Elva Ósk Ólafsdóttir; Helgi Björnsson
- Release date: 2006
- Running time: 99 minutes
- Country: Iceland
- Language: Icelandic

Cold Trail (Icelandic: Köld slóð) is a 2006 Icelandic film directed by Birni Brynjúlfi Björnssyni. The film was nominated for five Edda Awards, winning for best Sound & Music and best Visual Design.

== Cast ==
- Þröstur Leó Gunnarsson as Baldur Maríusson
- Elva Ósk Ólafsdóttir as Freyja
- Helgi Björnsson as Karl
- Hjalti Rögnvaldsson as Péter
- Tómas Lemarquis as Siggi
- Lilja Guðrún Þorvaldsdóttir as Ásta
- Anita Briem as Elín
- Harald G. Haraldsson as Tóti
