= Edda Award for Best Director =

Icelandic film award for directors (1999-)

The Edda Awards are the main national film and TV awards in Iceland, given annually since 1999. The Best Director (Icelandic: Leikstjóri ársins) winners are

Year	Director	Film
1999	Guðný Halldórsdóttir	Ungfrúin góða og húsið (The Honour of the House)
2000	Friðrik Þór Friðriksson	Englar alheimsins (Angels of the Universe)
2001	Ágúst Guðmundsson	Mávahlátur (The Seagull's Laughter)
2002	Baltasar Kormákur	Hafið (The Sea)
2003	Dagur Kári	Nói albínói (Noi the Albino)
2004	Hilmar Oddsson	Kaldaljós (Cold Light)
2005	Dagur Kári	Voksne mennesker (Dark Horse)
2006	Baltasar Kormákur	Mýrin (Jar City)
2007	Óskar Jónasson	Foreldrar (Parents)
2008	Ragnar Bragason	Reykjavík-Rotterdam (Reykjavik-Rotterdam)
2009
2010	Ragnar Bragason	Bjarnfreðarson (Mr. Bjarnfreðarson)
2011	Dagur Kári	The Good Heart
2012	Rúnar Rúnarsson	Eldfjall (Volcano)
2013	Baltasar Kormákur	Djúpið (The Deep)
2014	Benedikt Erlingsson	Hross í oss (Of Horses and Men)
2015	Baldvin Zophoníasson	Vonarstræti (Life in a Fishbowl)
2016	Grímur Hákonarson	Hrútar (Rams)
2017	Guðmundur Arnar Guðmundsson	Hjartasteinn (Heartstone)
2018	Hafsteinn Gunnar Sigurðsson	Undir trénu (Under the Tree)
2019	Benedikt Erlingsson	Kona fer í stríð (Woman at War)
2020	Hlynur Pálmason	Hvítur, hvítur dagur (A White, White Day)
2021	Ragnar Bragason	Gullregn (The Garden)
2022	Valdimar Jóhannsson	Dýrið (Lamb)
2023	Hlynur Pálmason	Volaða land (Godland)
