= Theódór Júlíusson =

Icelandic actor (born 1949)

Theódór Júlíusson (born 21 August 1949) is an Icelandic actor. He has appeared in more than twenty films since 1994. Theódór won the 2012 Edda Award for Best Leading Actor for his performance as Hannes in Volcano.

== Selected filmography ==
Year	Title	Role	Notes
2000	Angels of the Universe		
2001	The Seagull's Laughter	Þórður Lögga	
2002	Falcons	Bus Driver	
2006	Jar City	Elliði	
2008	Country Wedding	Lúðvík	
2011	Volcano	Hannes	
2013	The Deep	Gulli's Father	
2015	Rams	Kiddi	
