= Þröstur Leó Gunnarsson =

Icelandic actor (born 1961)

Þröstur Leó Gunnarsson (born 23 April 1961) is an Icelandic stage, film and television actor.

== Early life ==
Þröstur Leó Gunnarsson was born on born 23 April 1961 in Reykjavík. He graduated from the Icelandic School of Drama in 1985. He then began his career onstage at the Leikfélag Reykjavíkur, Reykjavík's premier theatre company, where he appeared in productions as: John Steinbeck's' The Grapes of Wrath, William Shakespeare's Hamlet, Molière's Tartuffe, Anton Chekhov's Platonov and Birgir Sigurðsson's Degi vonar.

== Stage and film career ==
Þröstur's first film role came in the 1986 Hilmar Oddsson-directed drama Eins og skepnan deyr (English release title: The Beast). He then followed in a number of films and television movies. He is possibly best recalled internationally for his roles in Baltasar Kormákur's 2000 romantic comedy 101 Reykjavík, opposite Spanish actress Victoria Abril, Kormákur's 2002 drama Hafið (English release title: The Sea), 2002's United States/Icelandic coproduction of No Such Thing, a bilingual fantasy starring Sarah Polley, Helen Mirren and Julie Christie, and Dagur Kári's 2003 drama Nói albínói (Nói the Albino). For his role in Nói albínói, Þröstur won Best Supporting Actor at the 5th Edda Awards.

In 2008, Þröstur won Iceland's Edda Award for Best Supporting Actor for his role in the Baltasar Kormákur directed drama Brúðguminn.

In May 2009, Þröstur began directing the play Við Borgum, Við Ekki! Borgum Ekki! (English title: We Can't Pay! Won't Pay!), a comedy centering on the 2008–2012 Icelandic financial crisis at the Borgarleikhúsið Reykjavík City Theatre.

In November 2009, he was the beneficiary of the Mrs. Stefania Guðmundsdóttir Memorial Fund (Icelandic: Minningarsjóður frú Stefaníu Guðmundsdóttur), a fund established in 1938 to promote Icelandic drama and theatre.

== Personal life ==
On 7 July 2015, a fishing vessel he was working on, Jón Hákon BA 60, capsized and sank close to Aðalvík. Þröstur and two of the crew were rescued an hour later, while another crewmember died in the accident.

== Awards and nominations ==
Year	Award	Category	Work	Result	Ref.
2003	Edda Awards	Best Supporting Actor	Nói Albinói	Won	
2009	Edda Awards	Best Actor	White Night Wedding	Won	
2023	BIF&ST	Best Actor	Driving Mum	Won	
2025	Edda Awards	Best Actor	Driving Mum	Won	

== Filmography ==
- 1986 Eins og skepnan deyr (English release title: The Beast)
- 1987 Áramótaskaup 1987 (Icelandic television movie)
- 1989 Flugþrá (Icelandic television short) – Boy
- 1989 Magnús – Gísli
- 1992 Sódóma Reykjavík (English release title: Remote Control) – Áslákur
- 1993 Í ljósaskiptunum (Icelandic video)
- 1995 Tár úr steini (English: Tears of Stone) – Jón
- 1996 Áramótaskaup 1996 (Icelandic television movie)
- 1997 Perlur og svín – Erlingur
- 1997 Stikkfrí (English release title: Count Me Out) – Siggi
- 1998 Áramótaskaup 1998 (Icelandic television movie)
- 1999 Skaupið: 1999 (Icelandic television movie)
- 2000 101 Reykjavík – Brúsi
- 2000 Óskabörn þjóðarinnar (English release title: Plan B)
- 2001 No Such Thing – First mate
- 2002 Hafið (English release title: The Sea) – Kalli Bumba
- 2003 Nói albínói (English release title: Noi the Albino) – Kiddi Beikon
- 2003 Þriðja nafni (English release title: The Third Name) – Arnar
- 2003 Njálssaga (Icelandic television movie) – Melkólfur
- 2004 Áramótaskaup 2004 (Icelandic television movie) – various roles
- 2005 Carjackin (short film) – Manager
- 2005 Beowulf & Grendel – Guard
- 2006 Köld slóð (English: Cold Trail) – Baldur Maríusson
- 2007 Parents – Addi
- 2008 Support (short film) – Suicidal patient
- 2008 Brúðguminn (English release title: White Night Wedding) – Börkur
- 2008 Sveitabrúðkaup (English release title: Country Wedding) – Svanur
- 2008 Reykjavik-Rotterdam – Jensen
- 2009 Reyndu aftur (short film) – Axel
- 2009 The Cliff (Icelandic television series) – Freyr
- 2010 Kóngavegur (English: King's Road) – Kári
- 2010 Algjör Sveppi og dularfulla hótelherbergið – Jón Gamli
- 2011 Eldfjall (English release title: Volcano) – Janitor
- 2012 Svartur á leik (English release title: Black's Game) – Jói Faró
- 2012 Djúpið (English release title: The Deep) – Lárus
- 2013 Metalhead – Gunnar
- 2014 Hjonabandssaela (short film) – Fannar
- 2014 Harry Og Heimir – Sigtryggur Klein
- 2015 Klukkur um jól (Icelandic television series) – Dad
- 2016 Pale Star – Ari
- 2016 Eiðurinn (English release title: The Oath) – Eldri Maður
- 2017 Ég man þig (English release title: I Remember You) – Skipstjóri
- 2017–2018 Hversdagsreglur (Icelandic television series)
- 2018 Flateyjargátan (Icelandic television miniseries) – Sailor
- 2020 Síðasta veiðiferðin (English release title: The Last Fishing Trip) – Hansi
- 2021 Alma
- 2021 Heartless (short film) – Pétur
- 2021 Áramótaskaup (Icelandic television series)
- 2022 Verbúðin (Icelandic television series) – Tryggvi
- 2022 Allra síðasta veiðiferðin – Hansi
- 2022 Vitjanir (Icelandic television series) – Guðjón Leó
- 2022 Svar við bréfi Helgu (English release title: A Letter from Helga) – Jósteinn
- 2022 Á Ferð með Mömmu (English release title: Driving Mum) – Jón
- 2023 Operation Napoleon – Jóhannes
- 2023 Auður (English release title: The Search for Audur) – Kútur
- 2023 Einvera (English release title: Solitude) – Gunnar
- 2024 Flamingo Bar (Icelandic television series) – Toni
- 2024 Guðaveigar (English release title: Divine Remedy)
- 2025 Fjallið (English release title: The Mountain) – Jónas
- 2026 Reykjavík Fusion (Icelandic television series) – Kristján
- 2026 Hildur (Icelandic television series) – Olgeir
