= Edda Award for Best Film =

Icelandic film award

Best Film (Kvikmynd ársins or Bíómynd ársins in Icelandic) is the main category of Edda Award, and it has been given annually since 1999.

== List of winners ==
Year	Film	Director
1999	Ungfrúin góða og húsið (The Honour of the House)	Guðný Halldórsdóttir
2000	Englar alheimsins (Angels of the Universe)	Friðrik Þór Friðriksson
2001	Mávahlátur (The Seagull's Laughter)	Ágúst Guðmundsson
2002	Hafið (The Sea)	Baltasar Kormákur
2003	Nói albínói (Noi the Albino)	Dagur Kári
2004	Kaldaljós (Cold Light)	Hilmar Oddsson
2005	Fullorðið fólk (Dark Horse)	Dagur Kári
2006	Mýrin (Jar City)	Baltasar Kormákur
2007	Foreldrar (Parents)	Ragnar Bragason
2008	Sveitabrúðkaup (Country Wedding)	Valdís Óskarsdóttir
2009
2010	Bjarnfreðarson	Ragnar Bragason
2011	Brim (Undercurrent)	Árni Ólafur Ásgeirsson
2012	Eldfjall (Volcano)	Rúnar Rúnarsson
2013	Djúpið (The Deep)	Baltasar Kormákur
2014	Hross í oss (Of Horses and Men)	Benedikt Erlingsson
2015	Vonarstræti (Life in a Fishbowl)	Baldvin Z
2016	Hrútar (Rams)	Grímur Hákonarson
2017	Hjartasteinn (Heartstone)	Guðmundur Arnar Guðmundsson
2018	Undir trénu (Under the Tree)	Hafsteinn Gunnar Sigurðsson
2019	Kona fer í stríð (Woman at War)	Benedikt Erlingsson
2020	Agnes Joy	Silja Hauksdóttir
2021	Gullregn (The Garden)	Ragnar Bragason
2022	Dýrið (Lamb)	Valdimar Jóhannsson
2023	Berdreymi (Beautiful Beings)	Guðmundur Arnar Guðmundsson
2024	Á Ferð með Mömmu (Driving Mum)	Hilmar Oddsson
2025	Ljósbrot (When the Light Breaks)	Rúnar Rúnarsson
2026	Ástin sem eftir er (When the Light Breaks)	Hlynur Palmason
