= Katla M. Þorgeirsdóttir =

Icelandic actress, voice actress and writer

Katla Margrét Þorgeirsdóttir (born 1970) is an Icelandic actress, voice actress and writer. She is known for her role as Laufey in Trapped.

== Career ==
Katla graduated from the Icelandic Drama School (now a department under the Iceland Academy of the Arts) in 1997. She has been involved in multiple productions on stage such as Jungle Book (based on the book by Rudyard Kipling), Sound of Music, the Wizard of Oz, Pippi Longstocking and Fanny and Alexander.

== Selected filmography ==
- Maður eins og ég (2002) as Magga
- Kaldaljós (2004) as Lára
- The Incredibles (2004) (Icelandic voice of Mirage)
- Fangavaktin (2009) (TV-series) as Emilía
- Bjarnfreðarson (2009) as Prison guard Emilía
- Órói (2010) as Gréta's mother
- Hetjur Valhallar - Þór (2011) (Icelandic voice)
- Wreck it Ralph (2012) (Icelandic voice of Calhoun)
- Þrestir (2015) as Ösp
- Trapped (2015-2016) (TV-series) as Laufey
