= Rasmus Videbæk =

Danish cinematographer (born 1973)

Rasmus Videbæk (born 21 February, 1973 in Copenhagen) is a Danish cinematographer.

== Films ==
The year of release and director of each film are indicated in parentheses.

- Murk (2005 - Jannik Johansen)
- Ledsaget udgang (2007 - Erik Clausen)
- L'île aux sorciers (2007 - Nikolaj Arcel)
- Sandheden om mænd (2009 - Nikolaj Arcel)
- The Good Heart (2010 - Dagur Kári)
- Go with Me (2015 - Daniel Alfredson)
- The Dark Tower (2017 - Nikolaj Arcel)
- Thor: Ragnarok (2017 - Taika Waititi) (2 scenes)
- 12 Strong (2018 - Nicolai Fuglsig)
- The Promised Land (2023 - Nikolaj Arcel)
