= The Good Heart =

- Theatrical poster
- Directed by: Dagur Kári
- Written by: Dagur Kári
- Starring: Brian Cox; Paul Dano; Isild Le Besco
- Cinematography: Rasmus Videbæk
- Edited by: Andri Steinn
- Production company: Zik Zak Filmworks
- Distributed by: Magnolia Pictures (US)
- Release dates: September 11, 2009 (Toronto); March 17, 2010 (France)
- Running time: 95 minutes
- Countries: France, Iceland
- Language: English
- Box office: $343,818 (worldwide)

The Good Heart is an Icelandic independent film written and directed by Dagur Kári, starring Brian Cox and Paul Dano. It debuted at the 2009 Toronto International Film Festival.

== Plot ==
Short-tempered bartender Jacques has a heart attack. Young homeless man Lucas fails in a suicide attempt. They share a room in the hospital. Jacques becomes obsessed with helping Lucas, even snooping through his medical records before finally tracking him down. Reluctantly, Lucas agrees to come to the bar, and Lucas is given a sparsely furnished room. Jacques trains Lucas as a bartender, where Lucas resists his cynicism and belittling of the customers. Jacques wishes to coach Lucas to become his successor but feels that Lucas is too soft toward the bar's patrons.

Lucas allows April to stay in his room, but Jacques tells Lucas that he should send her away. However, Lucas and April get married and both leave. Reluctantly Jacques allows April to come back because he finds it important that the bar will stay after his retirement or death, and therefore that his intended successor, Lucas, stays.

Lucas is jealous about April's interaction with the bar's patrons, and they break up. Jacques gets softer and Lucas less so. Lucas is killed after being hit by a car. His heart goes to Jacques, who has been waiting for a donor for a heart transplant. Although he always refused to sell his bar, he does so now and starts living in the tropics, where he has friends who supply the coffee for his bar.

== Cast ==
- Brian Cox as Jacques
- Paul Dano as Lucas
- Stéphanie Szostak as Sarah
- Isild Le Besco as April
- Nicolas Bro as Ib Dolby

== Reception ==
Review aggregator Rotten Tomatoes gives the film an approval rating of 30%, based on 37 reviews, with an average rating of 4.5/10. On Metacritic, the film has a weighted average score of 40 out of 100, based on 19 critics, indicating "mixed or average reviews".

== Box office ==
The film grossed $20,930 in the United States and $322,888 in other territories, for a worldwide total of $343,818.
