= Áramótaskaupið =

Annual Icelandic television comedy special

Áramótaskaupið ("The New Year's Lampoon") is an annual Icelandic television comedy special, broadcast on New Year's Eve by the state public service broadcaster RÚV. Initially aired on radio in 1948, and later moving to television in 1966, it features sketches satirizing the news events of the past year.

It is often the highest-rated television broadcast of the year in Iceland. In 2002, it was reported that the special had been seen by 95.5% of the country; Páll Magnússon, CEO of RÚV stated that this was most likely a record in the Western world. Due to its high viewership, advertising time during Áramótaskaupið is the most expensive on Icelandic television. The show ends just before midnight, and those Icelanders who shoot off fireworks usually do so after Áramótaskaupið ends.

Some of its sketches have become well known in Icelandic culture, such as its portrayal of Minister of Finance Ólafur Ragnar Grímsson as the Batman parody "Skattmann" ("Taxman"). In 2009, the show featured a sketch about the protests following the 2008 Icelandic financial crisis, in which Jón Gnarr played a strait-laced middle-aged protester shouting "Helvítis fokking fokk!!". The phrase swiftly became widely used in Iceland in relation to the crisis.

== Directors ==
- 1966: Andrés Indriðason
- 1967: Ómar Ragnarsson
- 1968: Flosi Ólafsson
- 1969: Flosi Ólafsson
- 1970: Flosi Ólafsson
- 1971: Ása Finnsdóttir & Ómar Ragnarsson
- 1972: Tage Ammendrup
- 1973: Laddi
- 1974: Hrafn Gunnlaugsson
- 1975: Tage Ammendrup
- 1976: Flosi Ólafsson
- 1977: Tage Ammendrup
- 1978: Þórhildur Þorleifsdóttir
- 1979: Sigríður Þorvaldsdóttir
- 1980: Andrés Indriðason
- 1981: Gísli Rúnar Jónsson
- 1982: Þráinn Bertelsson
- 1983: Laddi
- 1984: Guðný Halldórsdóttir
- 1985: Sigurður Sigurjónsson
- 1986: Karl Ágúst Úlfsson
- 1987: Sveinn Einarsson
- 1988: Gísli Snær Erlingsson
- 1989: Stefán Baldursson
- 1990: Gísli Rúnar Jónsson
- 1991: Ágúst Guðmundsson
- 1992: Þórhildur Þorleifsdóttir
- 1993: Guðný Halldórsdóttir
- 1994: Guðný Halldórsdóttir
- 1995: Ágúst Guðmundsson
- 1996: Ágúst Guðmundsson
- 1997: Viðar Víkingsson
- 1998: Laddi
- 1999: Örn Árnason & Sigurður Sigurjónsson
- 2000: Þórhildur Þorleifsdóttir
- 2001: Óskar Jónasson
- 2002: Óskar Jónasson
- 2003: Ágúst Guðmundsson
- 2004: Sigurður Sigurjónsson
- 2005: Edda Björgvinsdóttir
- 2006: Reynir Lyngdal
- 2007: Ragnar Bragason
- 2008: Silja Hauksdóttir
- 2009: Gunnar Björn Guðmundsson
- 2010: Gunnar Björn Guðmundsson
- 2011: Gunnar Björn Guðmundsson
- 2012: Gunnar Björn Guðmundsson
- 2013: Kristófer Dignus
- 2014: Silja Hauksdóttir
- 2015: Kristófer Dignus
- 2016: Jón Gnarr
- 2017: Arnór Pálmi Arnarsson
- 2018: Arnór Pálmi Arnarsson
- 2019: Reynir Lyngdal
- 2020: Reynir Lyngdal
- 2021: Reynir Lyngdal
- 2022: Dóra Jóhannsdóttir
- 2023: Benedikt Valsson & Fannar Sveinsson
- 2024: María Reyndal
- 2025: Allan Sigurðsson & Hannes Þór Arason
