= Virgin Mountain =

2015 film by Dagur Kári

- Film poster
- Directed by: Dagur Kári
- Written by: Dagur Kári
- Produced by: Baltasar Kormákur; Agnes Johansen
- Starring: Gunnar Jónsson
- Cinematography: Rasmus Videbæk
- Edited by: Olivier Bugge Coutté; Andri Steinn Guðjónsson; Dagur Kári
- Music by: Slowblow
- Production companies: Blueeyes Productions; Nimbus Film Productions; RVK Studios
- Release dates: 9 February 2015 (Berlinale); 20 March 2015
- Running time: 93 minutes
- Countries: Iceland; Denmark
- Language: Icelandic
- Box office: $749,711

Virgin Mountain is a 2015 Icelandic drama film directed by Dagur Kári, starring Gunnar Jónsson and Ilmur Kristjánsdóttir. Its Icelandic title is Fúsi [fuːsɪ], the name of the lead character. The world premiere took place at the 65th Berlin International Film Festival, where the film was screened on 9 February 2015 in the Berlinale Special program. It was released in Icelandic cinemas on 20 March 2015. The same year, it won the prizes for best narrative feature, actor, and screenplay at the Tribeca Film Festival, and the Nordic Council Film Prize.

== Plot ==
An Icelandic man in his 40s lives with his mother and works as ground staff at a nearby airport. He is involved in miniature wargaming in his spare time. On his 42nd birthday Fúsi gets a break from his daily routines when he is enrolled in a dance class. He falls in love but his depressive girlfriend (Sjöfn) suggests he move in with her, but then changes her mind. Despite that, he helps his ex-girlfriend to find happiness by turning a dump into a flower boutique shop. Fúsi, at the edge of falling back to his routines, decides to make changes for himself and takes a trip to Egypt. He and Sjöfn had planned to go away together. He seems to be waiting at the airport, but leaves alone. Once seated on the aircraft, he slowly smiles.

== Cast ==
- Gunnar Jónsson as Fúsi
- Ilmur Kristjánsdóttir as Sjöfn
- Sigurjón Kjartansson as Mörður
- Margrét Helga Jóhannsdóttir as Fjóla
- Franziska Una Dagsdóttir as Hera
- Arnar Jónsson as Rolf
- Þórir Sæmundsson as Elvar

== Reception ==
Stephen Dalton wrote in The Hollywood Reporter: "Gunnar Jónsson is an unlikely leading man, but extremely watchable, his physical acting and weary voice conveys both inner torment and purity of heart. Kristjánsdóttir also radiates agreeably offbeat charm as Sjöfn, even if her hangdog angel character that aches for pity would be more at home in a country and western song than in contemporary Iceland. ... A lightweight portrait of a potentially heavy subject, Kári’s fourth feature is an effortlessly likeable addition to his body of work, but too sweet and gentle to leave much of a lasting impression."
