= Margrét Helga Jóhannsdóttir =

Icelandic actress (1940–2026)

Margrét Helga Jóhannsdóttir (4 May 1940 – 17 June 2026) was an Icelandic actress.

== Life and career ==
Margrét graduated from the National Theatre's drama school in 1967. In 1972, she transferred to the Reykjavík Theatre Company. She played in four plays by Kjartan Ragnarsson, all of which were performed more than 200 times.

She played in a number of radio plays, television series and films, including Bjarnfreðarson (2009), Heimsendir (2011), Fangar (2015) and Gullregn (2020).

Margrét died on 17 June 2026, at the age of 86.
