= Fíaskó =

2000 Icelandic film

- Video cover
- Directed by: Ragnar Bragason
- Screenplay by: Ragnar Bragason
- Story by: Ragnar Bragason
- Produced by: Friðrik Þór Friðriksson; Skúli Friðrik Malmquist; Þórir Snær Sigurjónsson
- Starring: Róbert Arnfinnsson; Silja Hauksdóttir; Margrét Ákadóttir; Eggert Þorleifsson; Kristbjörg Kjeld; Ólafur Darri Ólafsson; Björn Jörundur Friðbjörnsson; Tristan Gribbin
- Cinematography: August Jakobsson
- Edited by: Sigvaldi J. Kárason
- Music by: Barði Jóhannsson
- Production companies: Íslenska kvikmyndasamsteypan; Zik Zak Filmworks
- Release date: 10 March 2000 (Iceland)
- Running time: 87 minutes
- Country: Iceland
- Language: Icelandic

Fíaskó (English title: Fiasco) is an Icelandic film written and directed by Ragnar Bragason and released in 2000. It was the director's first feature film.

== Synopsis ==
The film is divided into three chapters and looks at three generations of a family living under one roof in Reykjavík. The first part focuses on pensioner Karl Barðdal. The second is about his granddaughter, Júlía Barðdal. The third part deals with Steingerður Barðdal and her relationship with the preacher Samúel.

== Cast ==
- Margrét Ákadóttir as Steingerður Barðdal
- Silja Hauksdóttir as Júlía Barðdal
- Róbert Arnfinnsson as Karl Barðdal
- Eggert Þorleifsson as Samúel
- Björn Jörundur Friðbjörnsson as Hilmar
- Kristbjörg Kjeld as Helga
- Ólafur Darri Ólafsson as Gulli
- Tristan Gribbin as Nicole
