= Tómas Lemarquis =

Icelandic-French actor (born 1977)

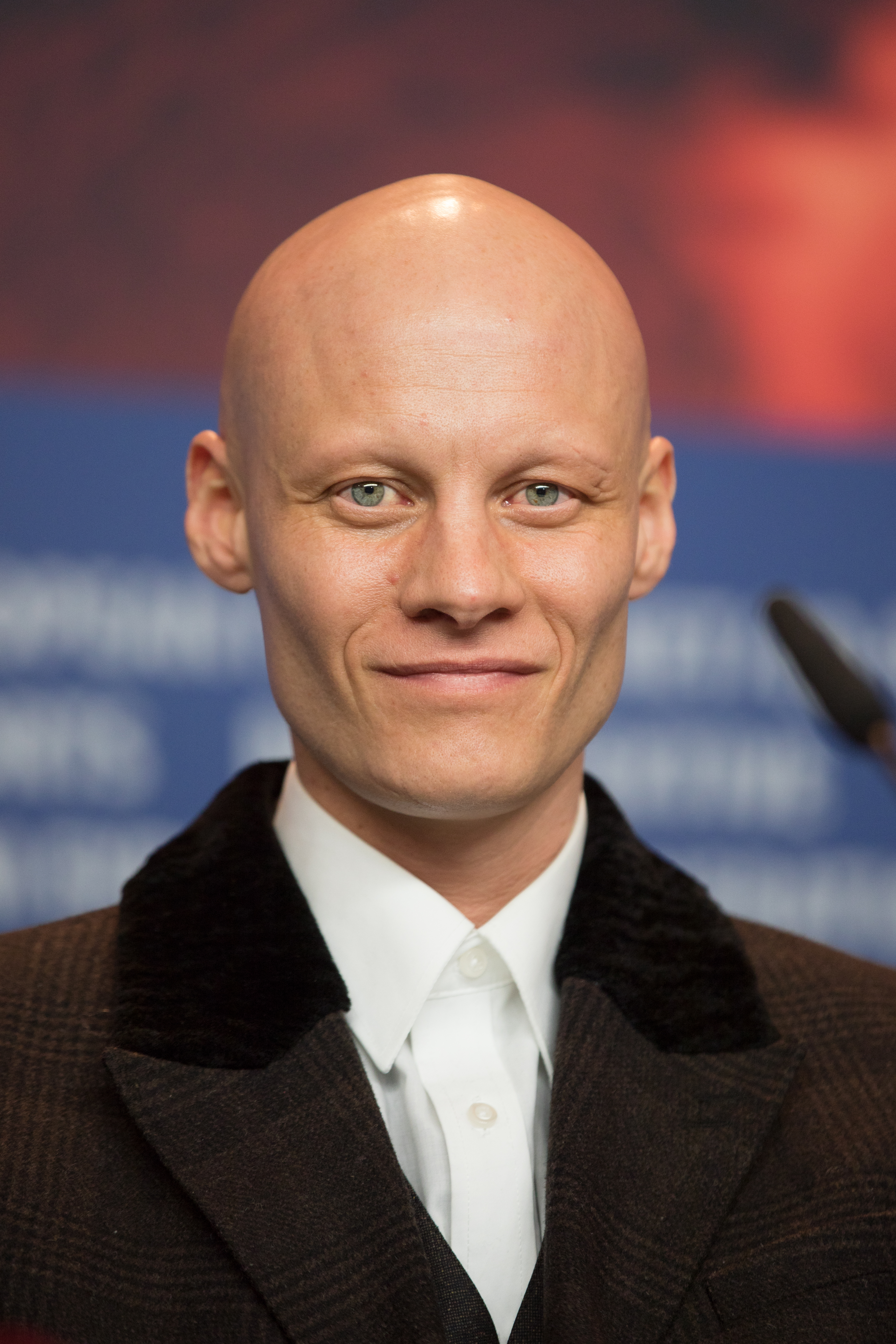
- Lemarquis at the 2018 Berlin International Film Festival
- Born: 3 August 1977 (age 49); Reykjavík, Iceland
- Occupation: Actor
- Years active: 2001–present

Tómas Lemarquis (born 3 August 1977) is an Icelandic–French actor.

== Early life ==
Lemarquis was born in Reykjavík, the son of an Icelandic mother and a French father, Gérard Lemarquis, who is a schoolteacher. His most distinguishing physical feature—a complete lack of hair of any kind—is the result of alopecia universalis, which made him completely hairless by the age of 14. He grew up in Iceland, and studied theater at the Cours Florent in Paris, where he was a classmate of actress Audrey Tautou. He also attended the Reykjavík School of Fine Arts in Iceland, graduating in 2004.

== Career ==
Lemarquis is possibly best known for his starring role in the 2003 Icelandic film Noi the Albino. Lemarquis' played a lead role in the 2018 Berlinale Film Festival winner, Touch Me Not. He has also appeared in films such as Snowpiercer, X-Men: Apocalypse and Blade Runner 2049.

In 2025 he stars as Magnifico Giganticus in the TV show Foundation.

== Personal life ==
Lemarquis is fluent in Icelandic, French, Danish, German and English.

== Filmography ==
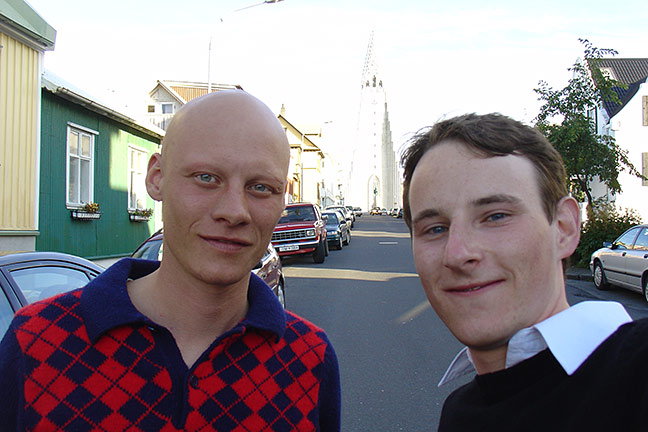
Lemarquis with German actor Florian Knorn, who dubs his films into German, in January 2007.

=== Film ===
Year	Title	Role	Notes
2001	Villiljós	Högnir	
2003	Nói Albínói	Nói	
2005	Nina's House	Gustav	
2006	Cold Trail	Siggi	
2008	Luftbusiness	Filou	
2009	Desember	Jonni	
2011	Mushrooms	French Soldier	
2012	Muster	René	
2012	Errors of the Human Body	Jarek Novak	
2012	Insensibles	Berkano	
2012	Am Himmel der Tag	Elvar	
2013	Snowpiercer	"Egg-Head"	
2013	Frau Ella	Claude	
2014	3 Days to Kill	"The Albino"	
2016	X-Men: Apocalypse	Caliban	
2016	Stefan Zweig: Farewell to Europe	Reporter Lefèvre	
2017	Blade Runner 2049	File Clerk	
2018	Touch Me Not	Tomas	
2018	Mihkel	"Bobo"	
2019	Dreamland	Vampire	
2019	The Ash Lad: In Search of the Golden Castle	The Fossegrim	
2019	The Chuck Band Show	Male Cancer Patient	
2020	Waiting for Anya	Lieutenant	
2020	Eurovision Song Contest: The Story of Fire Saga	Jiles	
2022	Driving Mum	Hitchhiker	

=== Television ===
Year	Title	Role	Notes
2011	Those Who Kill	Yuri	2 episodes
2011	SOKO Wismar	Einar Gunnarsson	Episode: "Auf eigene Faust"
2012, 2016	Tatort	Panne / Artur	2 episodes
2014	Die Pilgerin	Sepp	Miniseries
2021	Gone for Good	Joachim Ostertag	5 episodes
2024	Twilight of the Gods	Odric "Odd" (voice)	Episode: "Now Hear Of..."
2025	Foundation	Magnifico Giganticus	Season 3
