= Helgi Björnsson =

Icelandic actor and musician (born 1958)

Helgi Björns
- Born: Helgi Björnsson; 10 July 1958 (age 67); Ísafjörður, Iceland
- Genres: Pop/rock
- Occupations: Singer; songwriter; actor
- Instrument: Vocals
- Years active: 1984–present
- Formerly of: Grafík; Síðan skein sól

Helgi Björnsson (born 10 July 1958), often referred to as Helgi Björns, is an Icelandic actor and pop/rock musician. He has released several albums with his own band Helgi Björns Og Reiðmenn Vindanna. He was also a lead vocalist for the Icelandic bands Grafík and for Síðan skein sól (also known as SSSól).

As an actor, he has appeared as Arngrímur Árland in Atómstöðin, Moli in Sódóma Reykjavík, detective Hans Carlsson in Daryush Shokof's Hitler's Grave, and the murderous whaler Tryggvi in Reykjavik Whale Watching Massacre.

== Discography ==
=== Albums ===
Solo

- 1997: Helgi Björns
- 2005: Yfir Esjuna
- 2011: ...syngur íslenskar dægurperlur ásamt gestum
- 2014: Eru ekki allir sexý? (compilation)
- 2015: Veröldin er ný
- 2018: Ég stoppa hnöttinn með puttanum

as Helgi Björns og Reiðmenn Vindanna

- 2008: Ríðum sem fjandinn
- 2010: Þú komst í hlaðið
- 2011: Ég vil fara upp í sveit

in Grafík

- 1984: Get ég tekið cjens
- 1985: Stansað Dansað Öskrað

with Síðan skein sól / SSSól

- 1989: Síðan Skein Sól
- 1989: Ég stend á skýi
- 1990: Halló ég elska þig
- 1991: Klikkað
- 1992: Toppurinn
- 1993: SSSól
- 1994: Blóð
- 1999: 88–99

=== Singles ===
- 2014: "Viltu dansa?"
- 2014: "Ég fer á Land Rover frá Mývatni á Kópasker"
- 2019: "Það bera sig allir vel"

== Filmography ==
=== Film ===
- 1984: Atómstöðin as Arngrímur Árland
- 1987: Skytturnar (English title White Whales) as a billiard player
- 1988: Foxtrot as a mechanics
- 1992: Sódóma Reykjavík (English title Remote Control) as Moli
- 1993: Í ljósaskiptunum
- 1999: Ungfrúin góða og húsið (English title The Honour of the House) as Andrés
- 2000: Óskabörn þjóðarinnar
- 2001: Villiljós as Vikki
- 2001: Skrímsli (English title No Such Thing) as Leó
- 2004: Njálssaga as Otkell
- 2005: Strákarnir okkar (English title Eleven Men Out) as Pétur
- 2005: Beowulf & Grendel (Icelandic title Bjólfskviða) as Maður
- 2006: Köld slóð (English title Cold Trail) as Karl
- 2009: Reykjavik Whale Watching Massacre as Tryggvi
- 2011: Hitler's Grave as detective Hans Carlsson
- 2012: Frost as Yfirmaður Björgunarsveitar
- 2013: Hross í oss
- 2014: París Norðursins
- 2016: Grimmd
- 2023: Odd Fish

=== Television ===
- 2008: Svartir englar
- 2011: Makalaus
- 2016: Ligeglad
- 2016: Der Island-Krimi
- 2017: Steypustöðin
- 2020: The Minister
- 2020: Heima með Helga

== Personal life ==
Helgi was born in Ísafjörður to María Gísladóttir and Björn Helgason, a former member of the Icelandic men's national football team.

Helgi graduated from the Iceland School of Drama in 1983.
