= Sigurrós =

Sigurrós is an Icelandic female name, formed by conjoining sigur (victory) and rós (rose). Over 200 women currently carry it as their first given name and around 100 as their second or third given name.

The Icelandic band Sigur Rós was named after the band's singer's newborn sister named Sigurrós Elín.

== Name distribution ==
The following numbers have been harvested from the National Census of Iceland, provided by Þjóðskrá Íslands (the National Register Office).

== Notable people ==
- Sigurrós Þorgrímsdóttir, former member of parliament

=== Fictional Characters ===
- Sigurrós Stefánsdóttir, also known as SCP-239, a character from the SCP Foundation
