= Óskar Jónasson =

Icelandic film director

- Born: 30 June 1963 (age 61); Reykjavík, Iceland
- Occupation(s): Film director, screenwriter
- Awards: Edda Award for Best Director

Óskar Jónasson (born 30 June 1963) is an Icelandic film director and screenwriter. His film Remote Control was screened in the Un Certain Regard section at the 1993 Cannes Film Festival. His most recent film Reykjavík-Rotterdam won four Edda Awards including Director of the Year and Best Screenplay.

== Selected filmography ==
- The Sugarcubes: Live Zabor (1989)
- SSL-25 (1990, short)
- Remote Control (1992)
- Limbó (1993, TV series)
- Pearls and Swine (1997)
- Úr öskunni í eldinn (2000)
- Áramótaskaup (2001)
- Áramótaskaup (2002)
- 20/20 (2002)
- Svínasúpan (2003, TV series)
- Stelpurnar (2005, TV series)
- Reykjavík-Rotterdam (2008)
- Svartir englar (2008, TV series)
- Thor: Legend of the Magical Hammer (2011)
- Fiskar á Þurru Landi (2013)
- Fyrir framan annað fólk (2016)
