= Egill Helgason =

Icelandic journalist and television presenter

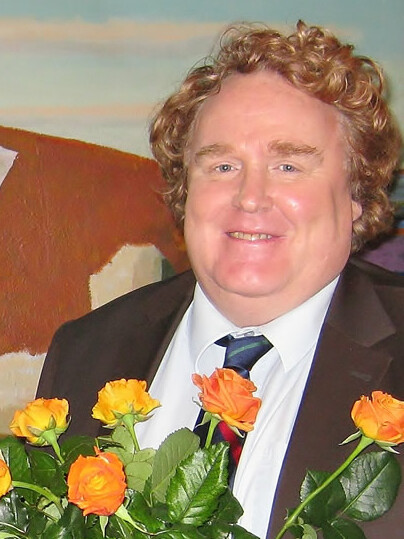
- Egill in 2014
- Born: 9 November 1959 (age 66); Iceland
- Occupations: Television presenter; journalist
- Years active: 1981–present

Egill Helgason (born 9 November 1959) is an Icelandic journalist and television presenter.

== Biography ==
Egill Helgason began his career in journalism in print media, in newspapers such as Tíminn and Helgarpósturinn. He studied journalism in Paris in 1986-1987, at the international Journalistes en Europe.

In 1988 Egill started moving into television, first with a series on different aspects of Icelandic nationality called Mannlegi þátturinn. Later he became a reporter at RÚV, the Icelandic National Broadcasting Service, and later at the independent Stöð 2.

In 1999 Egill started a political talk show called Silfur Egils at a newly founded television station called Skjár einn. The show quickly became very popular and influential, with Egill interviewing guests both in Icelandic and English, and occasionally in other languages.

In 2007 the show moved to Stöð 2 due to differences with the owners of Skjár einn. In 2007 Silfur Egils moved again, now to RÚV. During the Icelandic economic crash it became a center of the heated debates going on in the country, with Egill also inviting foreign guests such as the French prosecutor Eva Joly to his show, Nobel prize winning economists such as Paul Krugman and Joseph Stiglitz and social critics Noam Chomsky and Slavoj Zizek, as well as Julian Assange, Ayaan Hirsi Ali and Carl Bildt.

At RÚV Egill also started a television show on books, named Kiljan. It is a weekly program on books, blending literary criticism and interviews with authors. Among noted authors who have appeared on the show are Michel Houellebecq, Dave Eggers, David Mitchell, Ngugi wa Thiong'o, Nawal El Saadawi, Alice Walker and Dan Brown. Kiljan has been running since 2007.

Egill has made documentary series on historical subjects. Vesturfarar (Westward Bound, 2014) was a ten part series on the Icelandic emigration to Canada and the US from 1873 to 1914. Steinsteypuöldin (The Age of Concrete, 2016) is in five parts, recounting how Reykjavík was built after a terrible fire in 1915 which devastated the center of town, than mainly built from timber. Kaupmannahöfn, höfuðborg Íslands (Copenhagen, capital of Iceland, 2017) is the story of the long relationship between Iceland and Copenhagen, for a long time the de facto capital of the country.

Egill is presently working on a series called Siglufjörður, saga bæjar (Siglufjörður, the story of a town). It recounts how an isolated village in the north of Iceland became a great hub of activity, creating great riches, due to herring fishing which took off in 1903, and then the subsequent crash when the herring finally disappeared in 1967.

Egill has won numerous Eddas, annual awards given by The Icelandic Film and Television Academy.

Egill has been active on the internet since February 2000 when he started a blog on a now defunct website called Strikið. Egill has since kept on blogging, later on Vísir, Eyjan and now on a website called DV/Eyjan. He writes about different topics, politics, international affairs, literature, history, travel, and music.

He has also written a lot about Greece, being a noted philhellene who spends time in Greece every year.
