= Sigrún Edda Björnsdóttir =

Icelandic actress and author

- Born: 30 August 1958 (age 67); Reykjavík, Iceland
- Occupations: Actress, Author
- Years active: 1977–present
- Known for: Trapped
- Children: 2

Sigrún Edda Björnsdóttir (born 30 August 1958) is an Icelandic actress and author.

== Early life ==
Sigrún was born in Reykjavík, Iceland to parents Guðrún Ásmundsdóttir, actress and Björn Björnsson, flight mechanic. Her half-brother through her mother is the performance artist Ragnar Kjartansson.

== Career ==
Sigrún graduated from the Icelandic Theater School in 1981. She has played in numerous productions for the National Theater of Iceland as well as other theaters. She has played roles including Pippi Longstocking to Ophelia in Hamlet.

== Personal life ==
Sigrún has two children and is married to set designer Axel Hallkell Jóhannesson.

In 2001, Sigrún released her first book. The book is about a young troll girl Bóla and her friend Hnútur on their adventures from their home in Þingvellir to a 17 June (Iceland's Independence Day) celebration in Reykjavík. Bóla is a character Sigrún created and played for children's television in 1990.

== Filmography ==
- Morðsaga (1977) as Frú B
- Óðal feðranna (1980) as Stelpa á útimóti
- Atómstöðin (1984) as Guðný Árland
- Fastir liðir eins og venjulega (TV-series) (1985) as Erla
- SSL-25 (Short) (1990)
- Einkalíf (1995) as Sísí, Alexanders mother
- Áramótaskaup 2001 (2001) various roles
- Réttur (TV-series) (2010) as Eva
- Svartur á leik (2012) as Sævar K's Mother
- Metalhead (2013) as Anna
- Afinn (2014) as Erla
- Ófærð (TV-series) (2015-2016) as Kolbrún
