= Ingvar Eggert Sigurðsson =

Icelandic film actor (born 1963)

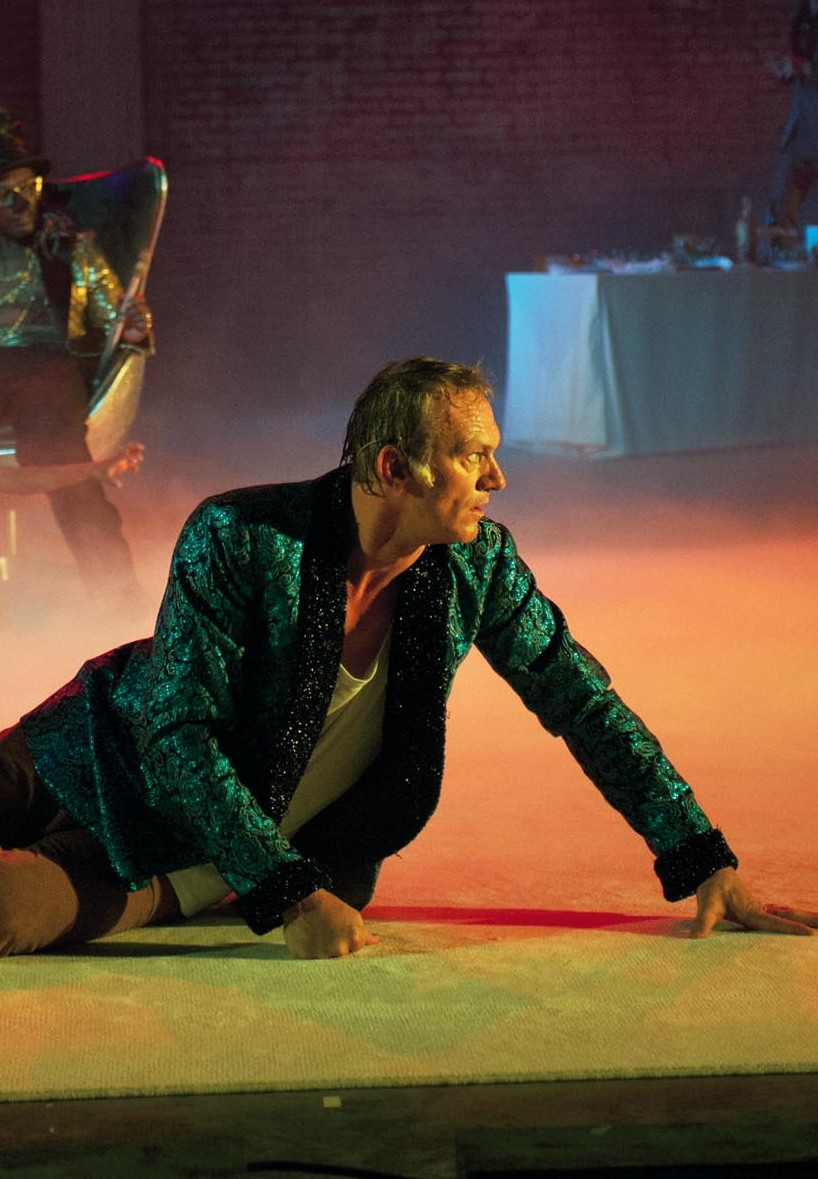
- Ingvar in July 2012
- Born: 22 November 1963 (age 62); Reykjavík, Iceland
- Other name: Ingvar E. Sigurðsson
- Occupation: Actor
- Years active: 1992–present

Ingvar Eggert Sigurðsson (Icelandic pronunciation: [ˈiŋkvar ˈɛcːɛr̥t ˈsɪːɣʏr̥θsɔn]; born 22 November 1963) is an Icelandic actor who has worked extensively in Icelandic cinema, television and stage productions. He became internationally known for his role as police officer Ásgeir in the Icelandic TV series Trapped (2015–2018), and in Icelandic director Hlynur Pálmason's films A White, White Day (2019) and Godland (2022).

== Life and career ==
Ingvar Eggert Sigurðsson was born on 22 November 1963.

Ingvar has acted extensively in film, television, and stage productions, both in Iceland and overseas. He had roles in Friðrik Þór Friðriksson's Englar alheimsins (Angels of the Universe) and Baltasar Kormákur's Mýrin (Jar City) and Everest. Ingvar became internationally known for his role as police officer Ásgeir in the Icelandic TV series Trapped (2015–18).

He has collaborated with Icelandic director Hlynur Pálmason on several occasions, from his graduation short film in Denmark, A Painter (En maler), in 2013, his second feature film A White, White Day, and in 2022, Godland (Icelandic: Volaða land, Danish: Vanskabte Land).

He portrayed a fictitious version of William fitz Osbern in the 2025 BBC series King & Conqueror.

== Recognition and awards ==
Ingvar has won the Edda Award for Actor or Actress of the Year four times, for his performances in the short film Slurpinn & Co.; and the feature films Englar alheimsins (Angels of the Universe); Kaldaljós (Cold Light); and Mýrin (Jar City), in 1998, 2000, 2004 and 2006 respectively.

He won the Audience Award at the 2000 European Film Awards for his performance in Englar alheimsins (Angels of the Universe). Apart from that he has been nominated many times for several roles in various films. In May 2019, Ingvar was awarded the Critics' Week festival best actor award for his performance in A White, White Day.

== Partial filmography ==
- Ingaló (1992) – Skúli
- Skýjahöllin (1994) – Pabbi Alla
- Devil's Island (1996) – Grjóni
- Pearls and Swine (1997) – Viktor
- Count Me Out (1997) – Hilmar
- No Trace (1998) – Óli
- Slurpinn & Co. (1998, short)
- Angels of the Universe (2000) – Páll
- Dramarama (2001) – Sölvi
- No Such Thing (2001) – Dr. Svendsen
- Falcons (2002) – Cop
- K-19: The Widowmaker (2002) – Chief Engineer Gorelov
- Stormy Weather (2003) – Gunnar
- Cold Light (2004) – Older Grímur
- Beowulf & Grendel (2005) – Grendel
- Jar City (2006) – Erlendur
- Children (2006)
- Parents (2007) – Óskar Sveinn
- Great Plane (2007)
- Stóra planið (2008) – Magnús
- Skrapp út (2008) – Siggi
- Country Wedding (2008) – Brynjólfur
- Reykjavík-Rotterdam (2008) – Steingrímur
- 8 (2008) – Father (segment "The Letter")
- King's Road (2010) – BB
- Woyzeck (2010) – Woyzeck
- Undercurrent (2010) – Skipper Anton
- Courier (2010) – Captain Slavko
- Polite People (2011) – Þorsteinn
- Borgríki (2011) – Gunnar
- I Against I (2012) – Issac Revchenko
- Rock Bottom (2013)
- Of Horses and Men (2013) – Kolbeinn
- Metalhead (2013) – Karl, Hera's father
- Playtime (2013) – The Artist
- Harry & Heimir: Morð eru til alls fyrst (2014) – Símon
- One Night in Istanbul (2014) – Altan
- Borgríki 2 (2014) – Gunnar
- Dirk Ohm – Illusjonisten som forsvant (2015) – Lensmann
- Everest (2015) – Anatoli Boukreev
- Sparrows (2015) – Gunnar
- Trapped (2015–2018) – Ásgeir Þórarinsson (20 episodes)
- Fyrir framan annað fólk (2016) – Doctor
- The Aquatic Effect (2016) – Siggi
- The Oath (2016) – Halldór
- Svanurinn (2017) – Karl
- Justice League (2017) – Mayor
- Vargur (2018)
- Mihkel (2018)
- Fantastic Beasts: The Crimes of Grindelwald (2018) – Grimmson
- A White, White Day (2019) – Ingimundur
- Succession (2019) – Magnusson (episode: "The Summer Palace")
- Zack Snyder's Justice League (2021) – Mayor
- Katla (2021) – Þór (eight episodes)
- Lamb (2021) – Man on Television
- Blackport (2021) – Nautið (episode: "The Contract")
- Killing Eve (2022) – Lars (three episodes)
- The Northman (2022) – He-Witch
- Godland (2022) – Ragnar
- Afturelding (2023) – Skarphéðinn (eight episodes)
- Rebel Moon (2023) – Hagen
- Sebastian (2024) – Daniel
- Rebel Moon – Part Two: The Scargiver (2024) – Hagen
- The Shrouds (2024)
- The Partisan (2024) – Armand
