= Silja Hauksdóttir =

Icelandic director

- Born: 12 January 1976 (age 49)
- Education: Binger Filmlab; FAMU; University of Iceland
- Occupations: writer; film director

Silja Hauksdóttir (born 12 January 1976) is an Icelandic writer and film director.

After studying philosophy at the University of Iceland, Silja took courses in screenwriting, directing and cinematography at FAMU in Prague and Binger Filmlab in Amsterdam.

She wrote the book Dís with Birna Anna Björnsdóttir and Oddný Sturludóttir, and later directed the full-length film Dís in 2004, which was nominated for the Nordic Council Film Prize.

Silja directed the award-winning TV series The Girls, along with Ástríður and Sisterhood. Sisterhood was the first Icelandic programme to be included in the streaming service Walter Presents.

She was also chosen to direct two editions of Áramótaskaupið – "The New Year's Lampoon" – in 2008 and 2014.

Her second full-length film, Agnes Joy, was released in 2019, for which she won the Edda Award for Best Film (Kvikmynd ársins).

== Filmography ==
As director:

- Dís (2004)
- The Choir (Kórinn) (2005 documentary)
- The Girls (Stelpurnar) (2005 TV series)
- And It Was You (Og það varst þú) (2006 short)
- The Government (Ríkið) (2008 TV series)
- Ástríður (2009–2013 TV series)
- Agnes Joy (2019)
- Sisterhood (Systrabönd) (2021 TV series)
