= Fóstbræður =

- Starring: Jón Gnarr; Sigurjón Kjartansson; Helga Braga Jónsdóttir; Þorsteinn Guðmundsson; Hilmir Snær Guðnason; Benedikt Erlingsson
- Country of origin: Iceland

Production
- Executive producers: Styrmir Sigurðsson, Óskar Jónasson, Sigurjón Kjartansson, Ragnar Bragason
- Running time: 30 minutes

Original release
- Network: Stöð 2
- Release: 4 October 1997 – 2001

Fóstbræður (English: Step brothers) is a comedy sketch show which premiered on the Icelandic television channel Stöð 2 in October 1997.

== Writing ==
The show was written by the stars themselves, Sigurjón Kjartansson, Jón Gnarr, Helga Braga Jónsdóttir, Þorsteinn Guðmundsson (season 2–5), Benedikt Erlingsson (season 1–3), Gunnar Jónsson (Season 3–5) and Hilmir Snær Guðnason (season 1 only).

== Awards and Perception ==
The show's five seasons (from 1997 to 2001) were received with much enthusiasm by the TV-watching public in Iceland, winning four Edda awards (1999, 2000 and 2001)

== Later releases ==
Because of demand, the show was released on VHS in 2000, and on DVD in 2007.
