= The Garden (2020 film) =

2020 Icelandic film

- Poster
- Directed by: Ragnar Bragason
- Written by: Ragnar Bragason
- Produced by: Davíd Óskar Ólafsson
- Starring: Sigrún Edda Björnsdóttir; Eyþór Gunnlaugsson; Karolina Gruszka
- Cinematography: Árni Filippusson
- Edited by: Michal Czarnecki
- Music by: Mugison
- Distributed by: Sena
- Release date: 10 January 2020 (Iceland)
- Running time: 112 minutes
- Country: Iceland
- Language: Icelandic

The Garden (Icelandic: Gullregn) is a 2020 Icelandic film written and directed by Ragnar Bragason. It won the Edda Award for Best Film in 2020.

== Plot ==
Indiana lives in a lower-class apartment block. She has a beautiful tree, which unfortunately is foreign, so the environment department tells her it has to be removed. She is falsely claiming disability pension for herself and her 39 year old son Unnar. Unnar gets a girlfriend Daniela, who is Polish, and Indiana is racist. Indiana tries to sabotage the romance. Unnar is seen on TV after rescuing some tourists, apparently he is quite fit, and has to pay back the support payments. For Christmas dinner, Unnar brings his grandmother from the nursing home, and we learn of Indiana's strained relationship with her mother. Daniela has had enough of Indiana's control over her son, and ends the relationship.

== See also ==
- Cinema of Iceland
