= Agnes Joy =

2019 film

- Film poster
- Directed by: Silja Hauksdóttir
- Starring: Donna Cruz
- Release dates: 5 October 2019 (Busan); 17 October 2019 (Iceland)
- Running time: 92 minutes
- Country: Iceland
- Language: Icelandic

Agnes Joy is a 2019 Icelandic drama film directed by Silja Hauksdóttir. It was selected as the Icelandic entry for the Best International Feature Film at the 93rd Academy Awards, but it was not nominated.

== Plot ==
Rannveig finds herself grappling with burnout in every facet of her ordinary suburban existence in a small city. She has a grumpy mother. Her job is a source of frustration, and her marriage is gradually deteriorating. Additionally, she engages in constant battles with her defiant daughter, Agnes, who has no interest in school and is daunted by the prospect of Agnes maturing and moving on. The arrival of a new neighbor, Hreinn, at their doorstep ushers in fresh challenges that are completely unforeseen and uncontrollable for Rannveig and her family. Both Rannveig and Agnes become too friendly with Hreinn. After Rannveig's mother dies, she cuts herself free from the family business.

== Reception ==
The film won the 2020 Edda film award for best Icelandic film and received five other Eddas, including for Katla M. Þorgeirsdóttir as best female lead.

== Cast ==
- Donna Cruz as Agnes Joy
- Þorsteinn Bachmann as Einar
- Þórey Birgisdóttir as Afgreiðslukona snyrtistofu
- Arnmundur Ernst Björnsson as Erlendur
- Ebba Katrín Finnsdóttir as Dr. Þuríður
- Pálmi Gestsson as Sigurhjalti
- Björn Hlynur Haraldsson as Hreinn

== See also ==
- List of submissions to the 93rd Academy Awards for Best International Feature Film
- List of Icelandic submissions for the Academy Award for Best International Feature Film
