= Heartstone (film) =

2016 film

- Film poster
- Hjartasteinn
- Directed by: Guðmundur Arnar Guðmundsson
- Written by: Guðmundur Arnar Guðmundsson
- Cinematography: Sturla Brandth Grøvlen
- Release dates: 1 September 2016 (Venice); 28 December 2016 (Iceland)
- Running time: 129 minutes
- Country: Iceland
- Language: Icelandic

Heartstone (Hjartasteinn) is a 2016 Icelandic coming-of-age drama film directed by Guðmundur Arnar Guðmundsson. It tells the story of a strong friendship between two preteen boys in a small Icelandic fishing village and the emotional and sexual turbulence of adolescence.

It was screened in the Discovery section at the 2016 Toronto International Film Festival. On 9 September 2016, the film won the Queer Lion at the 73rd Venice Film Festival. It was the first Icelandic film to be shown in a competitive section of the Venice Film Festival. It was also nominated for the 2017 Nordic Council Film Prize and won the 2017 Icelandic Edda Awards.

== Cast ==
- Baldur Einarsson as Þór/ Thor
- Blær Hinriksson as Kristján/ Christian
- Diljá Valsdóttir as Beta/ Beth
- Katla Njálsdóttir as Hanna/ Hannah
- Jónína Þórdís Karlsdóttir as Rakel/ Rachel
- Rán Ragnarsdóttir as Hafdís/ Tammy
- Søren Malling as Sven/ Robert
- Nína Dögg Filippusdóttir as Hulda/ Summer
- Gunnar Jónsson as Ásgeir/ Tyler
- Sveinn Ólafur Gunnarsson as Sigurður/ Brenda

== Production ==
The film is Guðmundur's first feature-length film and he began working on the script in 2007. It was shot in the fall of 2015 in Borgarfjörður eystri, Seyðisfjörður, Vopnafjörður, and Dyrhólaey.

== Reception ==
The film was well received in Iceland and won the 2017 Icelandic Edda Awards. The script, the dialogue, and the directing of young actors received praise. The cinematography by Sturla Brandth Grøvlen amplified Icelandic nature, with long shots of coastlines and fjords.

On review aggregator website Rotten Tomatoes, the film holds an approval rating of 84% based on 25 reviews, with an average rating of 6.97/10. On Metacritic, which assigns rating to reviews, the film has a weighted average score of 70 out of 100, based on 5 critics, indicating "generally favorable reviews".
