= Edda Awards =

Icelandic film and television award ceremony

The Edda Award is an accolade bestowed annually by the Icelandic Film and Television Academy, and is the most prominent film and television award in Iceland. The Edda has awarded for outstanding work in various categories of film and television annually since 1999, except in 2009 due to the economic crash the year before. In 2010, the event was moved from the usual November date to February, and the eligibility period for that year was from 1 November 2008 to 30 December 2009. Since 2011, the eligibility period is the previous calendar year.

== Categories ==
- Edda Award for Best Film
- Edda Award for Best Leading Actor or Actress
- Edda Award for Best Supporting Actor or Actress
- Edda Award for Best Director
- Edda Award for Best Documentary
- Edda Award for Best Television Program
- Edda Award for Best Television Personality

== Ceremonies ==
| Edition | Date | Best Film |
|---|---|---|
| 1st Edda Awards | 15 November 1999 | Ungfrúin góða og húsið |
| 2nd Edda Awards | 19 November 2000 | Englar Alheimsins |
| 3rd Edda Awards | 11 November 2001 | Mávahlátur |
| 4th Edda Awards | 10 November 2002 | Hafið |
| 5th Edda Awards | 10 October 2003 | Nói Albinói |
| 6th Edda Awards | 14 November 2004 | Kaldaljós |
| 7th Edda Awards | 13 November 2005 | Voksne Mennesker |
| 8th Edda Awards | 9 November 2006 | Mýrin |
| 9th Edda Awards | 11 November 2007 | Foreldrar |
| 10th Edda Awards | 16 November 2008 | Sveitabrúðkaup |
| 11th Edda Awards | 27 February 2010 | Bjarnfreðarson |
| 12th Edda Awards | 19 February 2011 | Brim |
| 13th Edda Awards | 18 February 2012 | Eldfjall |
| 14th Edda Awards | 16 February 2013 | Djúpið |
| 15th Edda Awards | 22 February 2014 | Hross í oss |
| 16th Edda Awards | 21 February 2015 | Vonarstræti |
| 17th Edda Awards | 28 February 2016 | Hrútar |
| 18th Edda Awards | 26 February 2017 | Hjartasteinn |
| 19th Edda Awards | 25 February 2018 | Undir trénu |
| 20th Edda Awards | 22 February 2019 | Kona fer í stríð |
| 21st Edda Awards | 6 October 2020 | Agnes Joy |
| 22nd Edda Awards | 3 October 2021 | Gullregn |
| 23nd Edda Awards | 10 May 2022 | Dýrið |
| 24th Edda Awards | 19 March 2023 | Berdreymi |
| 25th Edda Awards | 13 April 2024 | Á Ferð með Mömmu |
| 26th Edda Awards | 27 March 2025 | Ljósbrot |
