= Volcano (2011 film) =

2011 film

- Film poster
- Directed by: Rúnar Rúnarsson
- Written by: Rúnar Rúnarsson
- Produced by: Egil Dennerline; Skuli Fr. Malmquist; Thor Sigurjonsson
- Starring: Theódór Júlíusson
- Cinematography: Sophia Olsson
- Edited by: Jacob Secher Schulsinger
- Music by: Kjartan Sveinsson
- Distributed by: Wild Bunch Benelux
- Release dates: 13 May 2011 (Cannes); 20 September 2011 (Iceland)
- Running time: 95 minutes
- Country: Iceland
- Language: Icelandic
- Budget: 104 million króna (estimated)

Volcano (Icelandic: Eldfjall) is a 2011 Icelandic drama film directed by Rúnar Rúnarsson. The film was selected as the Icelandic entry for the Best Foreign Language Film at the 84th Academy Awards, but it did not make the final shortlist. At the 2012 Edda Awards, the film was nominated in 14 categories, winning in 5.

The film screened within many international film festivals, including the 2011 Toronto International Film Festival and the 2012 Maryland Film Festival.

== Plot ==
In 1973, Hannes and Anna left the island of Heimaey, following the volcano eruption. Some 30-odd years later, Hannes retires from his job as a school janitor. He goes fishing, and his old boat springs a leak, but is rescued. One day having dinner, wife Anna has a stroke, leaving her severely disabled. Hannes decides to care for her at home, further straining the relationship with his adult children. When they come to visit Anna, he retreats to the backyard to repair his old boat. Eventually, Hannes realises Anna's suffering is too much and suffocates her with a pillow. Her funeral is held in the cemetery of Heimaey.

== Cast ==
- Theódór Júlíusson as Hannes
- Margrét Helga Jóhannsdóttir as Anna
- Elma Lísa Gunnarsdóttir as Telma
- Benedikt Erlingsson as Pálmi
- Þorsteinn Bachmann as Ari
- Auður Drauma Bachmann as Tinna
- Þröstur Leó Gunnarsson as Janitor

== See also ==
- List of submissions to the 84th Academy Awards for Best Foreign Language Film
- List of Icelandic submissions for the Academy Award for Best Foreign Language Film
