= The Sea (2002 film) =

2002 film by Baltasar Kormákur

- The VHS cover
- Directed by: Baltasar Kormákur
- Written by: Olafur Haukur Símonarson (play); Baltasar Kormákur
- Produced by: Baltasar Kormákur
- Starring: Gunnar Eyjólfsson; Hilmir Snær Guðnason; Hélène de Fougerolles
- Edited by: Valdís Óskarsdóttir
- Release date: 2002
- Running time: 109 minutes
- Country: Iceland / France / Norway
- Language: Icelandic / Norwegian / English

The Sea, (Icelandic: Hafið, is a 2002 Icelandic comedy drama film, directed by Baltasar Kormákur. The film tells the story of a wealthy Icelandic family, owners of a fish industry company in a small Icelandic coastal town, and various family issues they have to deal with.

== Cast ==
- Gunnar Eyjólfsson as Thórdur
- Hilmir Snær Guðnason as Ágúst
- Hélène de Fougerolles as Françoise
- Kristbjörg Kjeld as Kristín
- Herdís Thorvaldsdóttir as Kata
- Gudrún Gísladóttir as Ragnheidur
- Sven Nordin as Morten
- Elva Ósk Ólafsdóttir as Áslaug
- Sigurdur Skúlason as Haraldur
- Nína Dögg Filippusdóttir as María
- Þröstur Leó Gunnarsson as Kalli bumba

== Production ==
The Sea was filmed almost entirely in and around Neskaupstaður.

== Reception ==
On the review aggregator website Rotten Tomatoes, the film holds a 49% approval rating, based on 51 reviews with an average rating of 5.6/10. The website's consensus reads, "This look at a fraught family reunion should be easily relatable, but The Sea drowns viewers in melodrama when it should be carrying them toward darkly comedic shores." On Metacritic, the film holds a score of 52 out of 100, which is based on 23 critics, indicating "mixed or average" reviews.

=== Awards ===
The film won eight awards at the Edda Awards, Iceland in 2002 (Best Actor for Gunnar Eyjólfsson, Best Actress for Elva Ósk Ólafsdóttir, Best Director, Best Screenplay, Best Supporting Actor for Sigurður Skúlason, Best Supporting Actress for Herdís Þorvaldsdóttir, Film of the Year and Professional Category: Sound/Vision), where it was also nominated for 4 more awards. In the same year, it was nominated for the Nordic Council Film Prize and for the Golden Shell at the San Sebastián International Film Festival. In 2003, it won the FIPRESCI Prize at the Istanbul International Film Festival, where it was also nominated for the Golden Tulip, and the Audience Award at the Tromsø International Film Festival in Norway.
