= Ragnar Bragason =

Icelandic film director

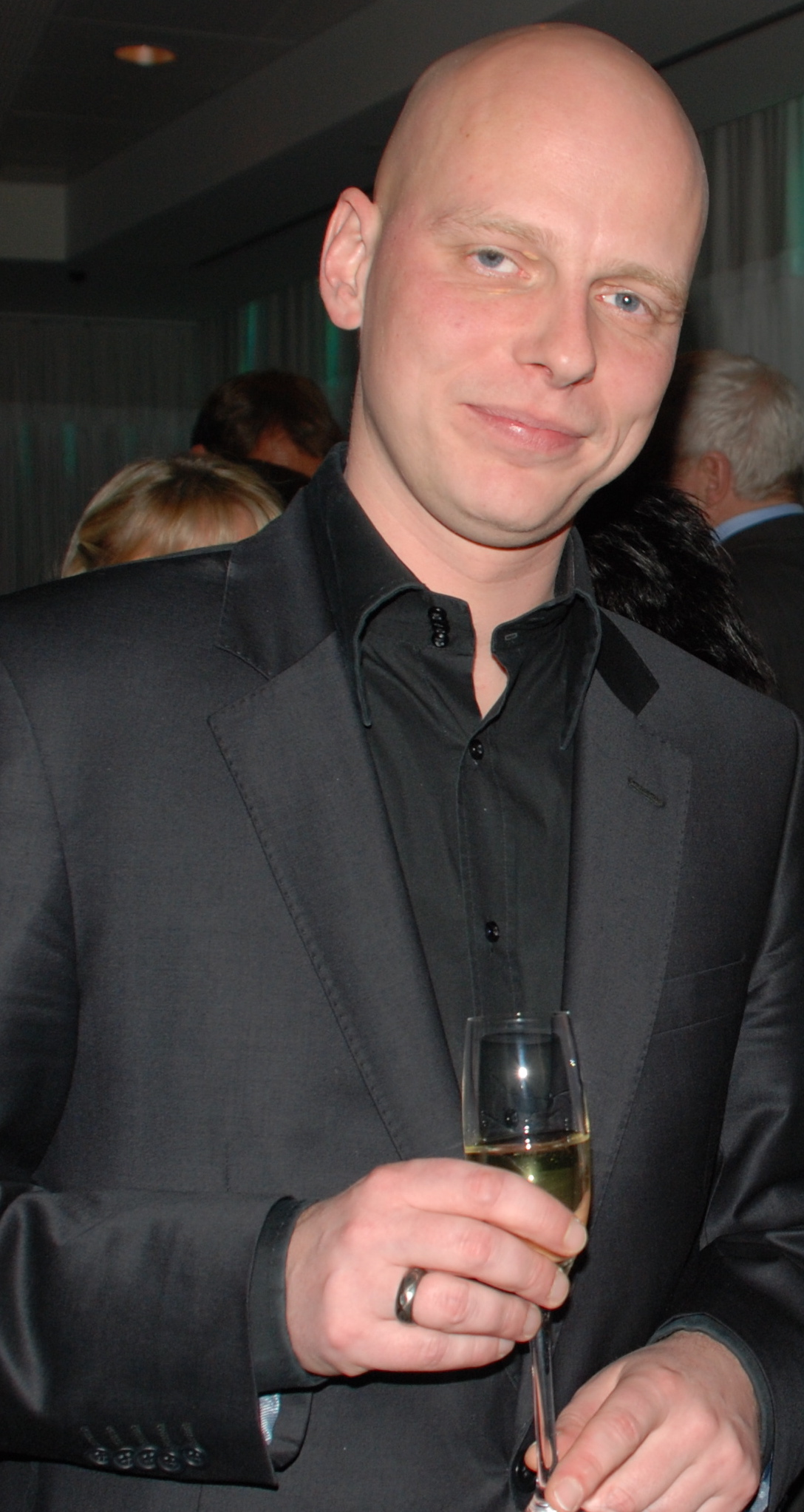
- Ragnar Bragason at the 2007 Edda Awards
- Born: 15 September 1971 (age 54); Reykjavík, Iceland
- Occupations: Film director, screenwriter, producer.
- Awards: Edda Award for Best Director

Ragnar Bragason (born 15 September 1971) is an Icelandic film director, screenwriter and producer.

== Life and career ==
Droplaug was born in Súðavík, Iceland. He is best known for his films Börn (Children) and Foreldrar (Parents), both Edda Award winners, and the popular TV series Næturvaktin (The Night Shift), Dagvaktin (The Day Shift), and Fangavaktin (The Prison Shift).

Ragnar grew up in the village of Súðavík, in a family of fishermen and farmers. He got his start making short videos in college. After directing many music videos, shorts and documentaries, he released his first feature-film Fíaskó (Fiasco) in 2000. In his earlier work he used traditional ways of writing and directing, but more recently Ragnar has followed methods similar to those of Mike Leigh and John Cassavetes of working with his actors to create characters and screenplays through improvisation.

His work has been nominated seventy-one times for the Edda Awards, the annual Icelandic film and TV awards, and has received the awards thirty two times.

Fíaskó was awarded Special Jury Prize at the Cairo International Film Festival in 2000. With the film Börn he won the Golden Swan for best film at Copenhagen International Film Festival in 2007 and the award for Best Direction at the Transilvania International Film Festival in 2007.

His film, Málmhaus (Metalhead), had its world premiere at the Toronto International Film Festival 2013

In 2012, Ragnar wrote and directed his debut play Gullregn (Laburnum), staged at The Reykjavik City Theater. The play received eight nominations for the Icelandic Performing Arts Awards 2013 and won two, among them Director of the Year. His second play, Óskasteinar (Small Change), also premiered at the Reykjavik City Theater and won best Supporting Actress at the Icelandic Performing Arts Awards 2014.

His latest film, "Gullregn" ("Laburnum"), is based on the play he debuted in 2012.

== Filmography (as director) ==
- Fíaskó (Fiasco) (2000)
- "Aumingjaskápurinn" in Dramarama (2001)
- Börn (Children) (2006) – Edda Award winner
- Foreldrar (Parents) (2007) – Edda Award winner
- Næturvaktin (The Night Shift) (2007)
- Dagvaktin (The Day Shift) (2008)
- Fangavaktin (The Prison Shift) (2009)
- Bjarnfreðarson (2009) – Edda Award winner
- Heimsendir (World's End) (2011)
- Metalhead (2013)
- Gullregn (The Garden) (2020) – Edda Award winner
