= Dark Horse (2005 film) =

2005 film by Dagur Kári

- Directed by: Dagur Kári
- Written by: Dagur Kári; Rune Schjøtt
- Produced by: Birgitte Skov; Morten Kaufmann
- Starring: Jakob Cedergren; Nicolas Bro; Tilly Scott Pedersen; Morten Suurballe
- Cinematography: Manuel Alberto Claro
- Edited by: Daniel Dencik
- Music by: Slowblow
- Production company: Nimbus Film Productions
- Distributed by: Nordisk Film Distribution A/S
- Release date: 13 May 2005 (Denmark)
- Running time: 109 minutes
- Countries: Denmark; Iceland
- Languages: Danish; English; Spanish
- Budget: €1,850,000
- Box office: $10,626

Dark Horse (Danish: Voksne mennesker) is a 2005 Danish-Icelandic film directed by Dagur Kári, about a young man, his best friend, and a girl. It was screened in the Un Certain Regard section at the 2005 Cannes Film Festival.

== Cast ==
- Jakob Cedergren as Daniel
- Nicolas Bro as Morfar
- Tilly Scott Pedersen as Franc
- Morten Suurballe as Dommeren
- Angela Bundalovic as Dommeren's daughter
- Bodil Jørgensen as Gunvor
- Nicolaj Kopernikus as Tejs
- Anders Hove as Herluf C
- Kristian Halken as Allan Simonsen
- Thomas W. Gabrielsson as Sleep researcher Arne
- Michelle Bjørn-Andersen as Dommerens' wife
- Pauli Ryberg as Skule Malmquist
- Mikael Bertelsen as clerk
- Asta Esper Hagen Andersen as grandmother Lovisa
- Vera Gebuhr as lady in bakery
- Peder Pedersen as graffiti artist
