= Edda Award for Best Television Program =

Annual Icelandic television award

Best Television Program is one of the categories of the Edda Awards.

== 1999-2006 ==
Year	Program
1999	Fóstbræður (Blood brothers)
2000	Fóstbræður (Blood brothers)
2001	Fóstbræður (Blood brothers)
2002	Áramótaskaupið (The New Year's Lampoon)
2003	Sjálfstætt fólk
2004	Njáls saga
2005	Stelpurnar
2006	Stelpurnar
