= Noi the Albino =

2003 film by Dagur Kári

Nói Albinói
- Directed by: Dagur Kári
- Written by: Dagur Kári
- Produced by: Philippe Bober
- Starring: Tómas Lemarquis; Þröstur Leó Gunnarsson; Elín Hansdóttir
- Distributed by: Palm Pictures
- Release date: January 24, 2003
- Running time: 90 minutes
- Country: Iceland
- Language: Icelandic
- Budget: €1,100,000
- Box office: $1,317,132

Noi the Albino (Icelandic: Nói albinói;) is an Icelandic film by director Dagur Kári released in 2003. The film explores the life of teenage outsider Nói (played by Tómas Lemarquis) in a remote fishing village in western Iceland. It won multiple awards.

Nói albinói was filmed in Bolungarvik (pop. 957), a fishing village in the far northwest of Iceland, located on the Westfjords peninsula.

The moody original musical score is from the director's band, Slowblow.

The Los Angeles Times' Kenneth Turan called the movie "singular enough to have swept the Eddas, the Icelandic Academy Awards" and noted that it was a selection in "dozens of film festivals." Skye Sherwin of the BBC called it "a coming-of-age tale, bound between grinding humdrum and exquisite surrealism."

== Plot ==
Nói Kristmundsson is a 17-year-old living in a remote fishing village in western Iceland with his grandmother Lína (Anna Friðriksdóttir). His father Kiddi (Þröstur Leó Gunnarsson), an alcoholic taxi driver, also lives in town, but Nói appears to have a distant relationship with him. Nói has alopecia totalis which marks him out from others in the village. Much of his time is spent either wandering the desolate town, at the town bookstore, or in a hidden cellar at his grandmother's house, which serves as his private sanctuary. There are signs that Nói is highly intelligent, but he is uninterested in school and has an adversarial relationship with his teachers. He often cuts class to go to the local gas station, where he rigs the slot machine to win money. The bleak town seem to offer few prospects for the future, and Nói doesn't seem to fit in there.

Things begin to change for Nói when he encounters the new gas station attendant, an attractive young woman who is new to the village. Óskar (Hjalti Rögnvaldsson) the bookstore owner informs him that she is his daughter Íris (Elín Hansdóttir), and asks him to stay away from her. Nói instead begins a tentative romance with Íris. One night they break into the local natural history museum. Hide from the nightwatchman in a storage closet, they discover a light-up map of the world. Íris suggests that they run away together. Nói asks where, and Íris suggests he press a button on the map and the Hawaiian Islands light up. This is when Nói begins to dream of leaving the village and Iceland altogether. He receives a View-Master as an 18th birthday present from his grandmother, which comes with slide disc of tropical island images. He is transfixed by an image of a tropical beach, the total opposite of his surroundings.

One day at school, he is asked by the principal to meet with a specialist. Nói responds sarcastically to his questions while solving a Rubik's Cube. Later, Nói uses a tape recorder to take his place in math class, which enrages the teacher. The principal is forced to expel Nόi after the teacher gives the ultimatum that either Nόi goes or he will resign. Nόi angrily leaves the school, knowing that his father will be upset with him. He tells him, and an altercation between them results. Afterwards his father takes him out to a local bar, where he is kicked out. He goes to Óskar's house in search of ĺris. Óskar tells him he's sent her back, but Íris appears, insisting that Nói stay the night, over Óskar's objections.

His grandmother goes to a local fortune teller, Gylfi (Kjartan Bjargmundsson), and requests that he read Nói's future. Nói is working as a grave digger at this time, and goes to see Gylfi on a lunch break. After reading the tea leaves, Gylfi informs Nói that his future is filled with death, which Nói does not believe. Nói attempts to rob a bank with his grandmother's shotgun, but is thwarted when the bank teller doesn't take him seriously and has the gun taken out of his hands by the bank manager. He comes back inside the bank thoroughly humiliated and withdraws all of the money in his account, using it to buy a nice suit. He then steals a car, intending to run away with Íris. She is confused by his arrival and Nói leaves. His car gets stuck in the snow, and he is quickly apprehended by the police. His father bails him out of jail.

Nói arrives home and descends into his cellar sanctuary. Suddenly, the earth shudders violently, and Nói is trapped. He is eventually awoken by the door above him being ripped open. He discovers that there was an avalanche, which has destroyed the house and killed his grandmother and father. At a rescue shelter, he watches the news and discovers that nearly everyone he knows has been killed in the avalanche, including Íris. He later returns to the rubble of his grandmother's house to retrieve the View-Master. The movie ends with Nói looking at the tropical beach scene slide as it slowly becomes a vision of a real tropical beach.

== DVD details ==
MPAA: Rated PG-13 for language and brief nudity.

Runtime: France: 82 min; Iceland: 93 min; Netherlands (Rotterdam Film Festival): 90 min; Netherlands: 95 min; Sweden: 89 min; USA: 93 min

DVD Features

- Deleted scenes
- Making of featurette
- US theatrical trailer

The extras on the DVD reveal that the director prefers amateur actors and ambiguity. He was not at all trying to portray real life in the village; he was trying to tell a fantasy story about an alien.

Within the movie the recurring tropical theme seems to connect to Hawaii, but the repeated beach picture that comes alive at the end was actually filmed in Cuba; the director imagines that a sequel might be filmed there.

Filming locations for Nói Albinói:

- Bolungarvík, Iceland
- Cuba
- Reykjavík, Iceland
- Ísafjörður, Iceland
- Þingeyri, Iceland

Production company: Zik zak filmworks
