= Dagur Kári =

Icelandic film director (born 1973)

- Born: Dagur Kári Pétursson; 12 December 1973 (age 52); Paris, France
- Other names: Dagur Kari Petursson, Dag Kára Pétursson
- Education: National Film School of Denmark
- Awards: Edda Award for Best Director

Dagur Kári (born Dagur Kári Pétursson; 12 December 1973) is an Icelandic film director.

== Early life ==
Dagur Kári was born in Paris, France, to Icelandic parents. The family returned to Iceland when he was 3 years old. After attending local schools as a child, Kári went to Denmark for college. He graduated from the National Film School of Denmark in 1999, having created the art house short movie Lost Weekend. The film won 11 prizes on the international festival circuit.

== Career ==
Kari's first feature film Noi the Albino (Nói albínói, 2003) won several international awards. His second film, Voksne mennesker (Dark Horse, 2005) was screened in the Un Certain Regard section at the 2005 Cannes Film Festival.

In 2008, he finished his first English-language film The Good Heart, starring Americans Brian Cox and Paul Dano, and French actress Isild Le Besco.

He is also a member of the band Slowblow. He featured their music in Nói albínói.

In December 2011 it was announced to produce a drama film Rocketman, which eventually became Virgin Mountain, with Baltasar Kormákur and Dagur Kári was set to direct the film. In January 2013 it is again announced that film will be produced by Kormákur with his partner Agnes Johansen. Denmark's Nimbus Film will co-produce the film. Film's production started in February and will be filmed at the end of 2013, and is expected to release in 2015.

As of 2015, he was a senior teacher of directing at the National Film School of Denmark, as well as a member of the Slowblow music band.

== Filmography ==
- Old Spice (1999)
- Lost Weekend (1999)
- Dramarama (Icelandic. Villiljós) (2001)
- Noi the Albino (Icelandic. Nói Albínói) (2003)
- Dark Horse (Danish. Voksne mennesker) (2005)
- The Good Heart (2009)
- Virgin Mountain (Fusi) (2015)
- Utmark (2021)

== See also ==
- Zik zak filmworks
