= Guy Kent =

American actor and producer

- Born: Guy Kent; Los Angeles, California
- Occupations: Actor, producer
- Years active: 2010–present

Guy Kent is an American actor and producer. He stars in The Place Between from acclaimed visual artist Chris Peters opposite Samantha Sloyan and stars in and produces the American-Icelandic international drama Autumn Lights with the producers of the Icelandic Academy Award winning film Metalhead, David Gordon Green's Prince Avalanche, and Nordic Council Film Prize-winning Either Way.

He stars in and produces two Academy Award-qualified short films The Atomic Dream and Resurrektor. He also produces Aurora, which had its World Premiere at Oscar-Qualifying HollyShorts Film Festival and FilmQuest in 2026 ahead of its festival run. The film also plays at Festival of Fantastic Films where it is nominated for the Delta Award for Best Science Fiction.

== Life and career ==
He stars in the international drama Autumn Lights opposite Icelandic Academy Award winners Thora Bjorg Helga, Sveinn Ólafur Gunnarsson and Borgia's Marta Gastini. He produced the film with the film's director Angad Aulakh and award-winning Icelandic producers Davið Óskar Ólafsson and Árni Filippusson.

Autumn Lights was honored as a Peter Travers New York Film Critics Series (NYFCS) pick before it opened in select theaters in North America on October 21, 2016. In Fall 2016, he shared in the nomination for Best Film at Norway's Cinema Scandinavia Awards. In addition, Autumn Lights was shortlisted by AMPAS for Best Original Score and Best Original Song for the Academy Awards in 2017. The film was a NYFCS Pick and was released in theaters in North America on October 21, 2016.

The Atomic Dream was released in theaters in North America by Filmocracy and iGems in Fall 2022.

Aurora has amassed widespread critical acclaim, being called "a gorgeous film" by Film Threat

He also appeared on ABC's FlashForward.

Kent was born in Los Angeles and graduated from the School of Cinematic Arts at the University of Southern California.

== Filmography ==
=== Film ===
Year	Film	Role	Notes
2016	Autumn Lights	David	Also Producer; Nominated - Grand Jury Prize Best Picture Riviera International Film Festival (Italy); Nominated - Best Actor Jury Prize Riviera International Film Festival (Italy); Nominated - Best Film, Cinema Scandinavia Awards (Norway); New York Film Critics Series Pick
2022	The Atomic Dream	Frank	
2023	Resurrektor	Paul	Winner - Best Horror Short Film, New York Shorts International Film Festival
2024	Ominous Thrill	James Douglass	Recurring
2025	The Place Between	Dan Allenford	
2026	Aurora	Freddie Ballard	

=== Television ===
Year	Film	Role	Notes
2010	FlashForward	Chad	Episode: "Course Correction"

- Nominated - Best Sci-Fi Short Film for Aurora, FilmQuest 2026 (United States)
- Winner - Best Horror Short Film for Resurrektor, New York International Short Film Festival (United States)
- Winner - Best Sci-Fi Short Film for The Atomic Dream, British Short Film Awards for The Atomic Dream (United Kingdom)
- Nominated - Best Acting Ensemble for The Atomic Dream, British Short Film Awards for The Atomic Dream (United Kingdom
- Winner - Cult Critic Movie Awards for The Atomic Dream
- Nominated - Jury Prize for Best Actor for Autumn Lights, Riviera International Film Festival (Italy)
- Nominated - Grand Jury Prize for Best Picture for Autumn Lights, Riviera International Film Festival (Italy)
- Nominated - Best Picture for Autumn Lights, Cinema Scandinavia Awards 2016 (Norway)
