= Autumn Lights =

- Theatrical release poster
- Directed by: Angad Aulakh
- Written by: Angad Aulakh
- Produced by: Angad Aulakh; Guy Kent; Ashley M. Kent; Davíd Óskar Ólafsson; Árni Filippusson
- Starring: Guy Kent; Marta Gastini; Sveinn Ólafur Gunnarsson; Thora Bjorg Helga
- Cinematography: Árni Filippusson
- Edited by: Valdís Óskarsdóttir
- Music by: Hugi Gudmundsson; Hjörtur Ingvi Jóhannsson
- Production companies: Last Carnival; Mystery Productions; Sugarloaf Productions
- Distributed by: Freestyle Releasing; Freestyle Digital Media
- Release date: October 21, 2016 (United States/Canada)
- Running time: 98 minutes
- Countries: United States; Iceland; France
- Languages: English; Italian; Icelandic

Autumn Lights is an American–Icelandic international drama film written and directed by Angad Aulakh. The film stars Guy Kent, Marta Gastini, and Sveinn Ólafur Gunnarsson. Set in Iceland, the film is a meditative story of morality, virtue, and relationships as seen through the eyes of a foreigner in a strange land. The film was honored as a Peter Travers New York Film Critics Series (NYFCS) pick before it opened in limited theatrical release in North America on October 21, 2016, from Freestyle Releasing and Freestyle Digital Media. The film opened in theaters in Northern Europe on November 4, 2016, and was nominated for Best Picture at the Riviera International Film Festival.

The film is produced by Angad Aulakh and Guy Kent, alongside Ashley M. Kent, Davíd Óskar Ólafsson and Árni Filippusson.

== Plot ==
The story follows David (Guy Kent), an introverted American photographer adrift in remote Iceland while on assignment. When he gets caught in a local investigation after discovering a deserted body washed ashore, David is temporarily bound to a place he doesn't call home and he acquaints himself with the few inhabitants in the area, among them Marie (Marta Gastini), an Italian woman whose shiftiness betrays not only her beautiful face but her Icelandic husband Jóhann (Sveinn Ólafur Gunnarsson) and his own unruffled demeanor. As days pass, David's fascination with the couple intensifies and he slowly begins to find himself entangled in their mysterious lives.

== Cast ==
- Guy Kent as David
- Marta Gastini as Marie
- Sveinn Ólafur Gunnarsson as Jóhann
- Thora Bjorg Helga as Eva
- Salóme Gunnarsdóttir as Liv
- Stefán Hallur Stefánsson as Sveinn
- Kolbeinn Arnbjörnsson as Alex
- Snorri Engilbertson as Lars
- Sveinn Geirsson as The Detective
- Lilja Birgisdottir as Elisa
- Jordan Goldnadel as Marcel
- Charlotte Vercoustre as Isabella

== Production ==
=== Locations ===
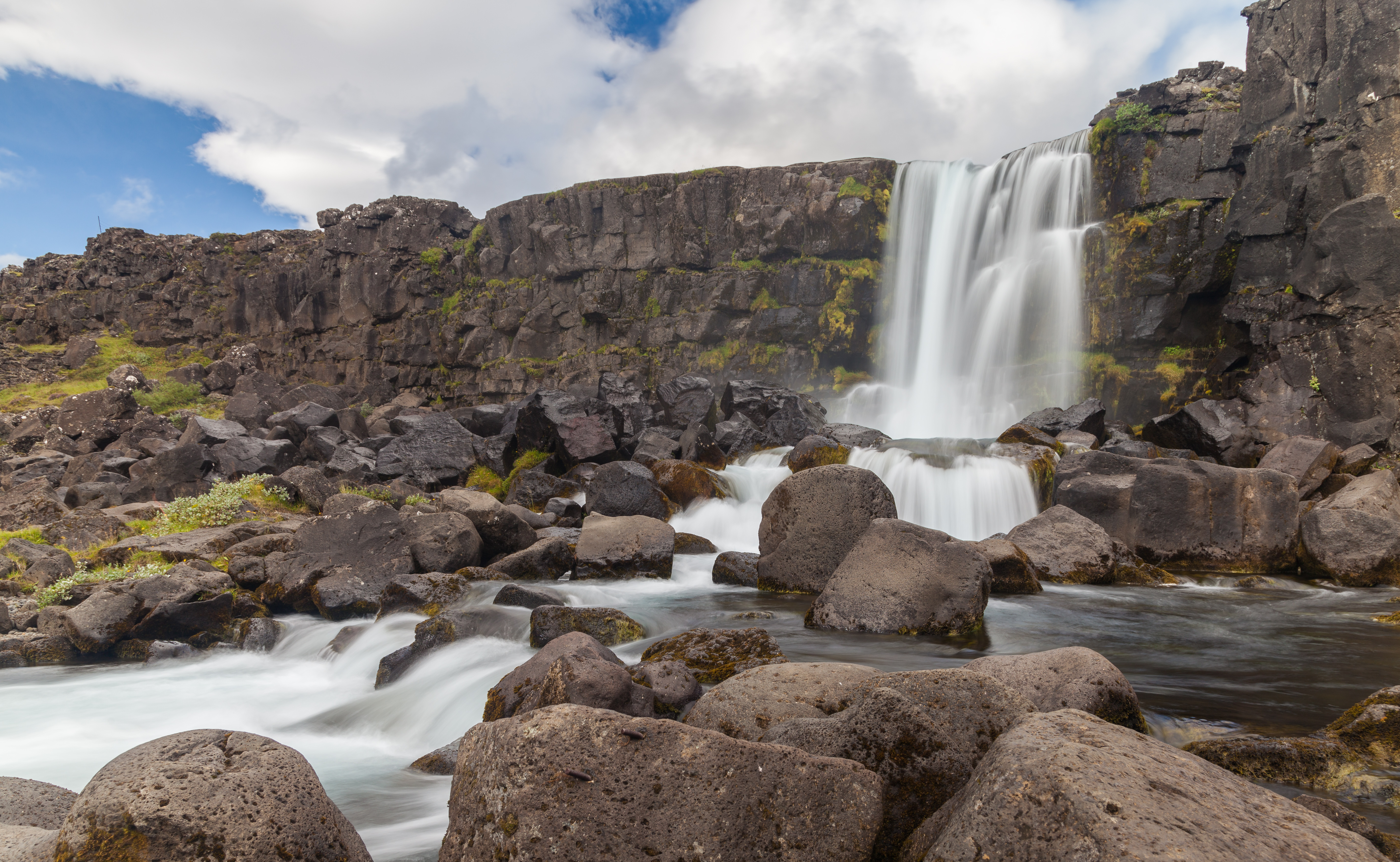
Öxarárfoss Waterfall where part of production took place

According to IndieWire, Autumn Lights was the first American film in history to have been both shot and completed in Iceland. Aside from American writer/director Angad Aulakh, American actor/producer Guy Kent, and Italian actress Marta Gastini, the rest of the cast and crew were Icelandic, include BAFTA winner Valdís Óskarsdóttir, Icelandic Academy Award-winning production designer Hulda Helgadóttir, and Icelandic Academy Award-winning make-up artist Steinnun Thordardóttir.

Autumn Lights was shot on location throughout Iceland and in Paris, France. Production of the film primarily took place in Þingvellir, Iceland but filming also took place in studio in Reykjavík.

=== Crew ===
In addition to producers Angad Aulakh and Guy Kent, Icelandic producers Davið Óskar Ólafsson and Árni Filippusson also produced the Autumn Lights. Their previous films include Icelandic Academy Award-winning films Metalhead, which premiered at the Toronto International Film Festival in 2013; Either Way, which premiered at Karlovy Vary International Film Festival; and David Gordon Green's Prince Avalanche, which was a remake of their original film Either Way and premiered at the Sundance Film Festival.

== Release ==
Autumn Lights was acquired by North American distributor Freestyle Releasing, ahead of its limited theatrical release in the United States and Canada on October 21, 2016. The film opened in theaters in Northern Europe on November 4, 2016.

Ahead of its European release, the film was programmed in Italy's inaugural Riviera International Film Festival, where it competed in the Main Competition for the Grand Jury Prize against films such as Xavier Dolan's It's Only the End of the World, Amanda Kernell's Sami Blood, Leyla Bouzid's As I Open My Eyes, and Ciro Guerra's Academy Award-nominated film Embrace of the Serpent.

== Soundtrack ==
The soundtrack includes the original score by Hugi Gudmundsson and Hjörtur Ingvi Jóhannsson and the original song "Seconds" by Hjaltalín's Sigrídur Thorlacius, with music and lyrics written by Johannsson. The soundtrack was released on October 16, 2016.

The film's original song "Seconds" and the film's score were shortlisted by the Academy of Motion Picture Arts and Sciences for the 2017 Academy Awards.

== Accolades ==
The film was In Competition at the 2017 Riviera International Film Festival where it was nominated for Best Picture, Best Director, Best Actress, and Best Actor. The film was considered divisive among critics, with the Village Voice calling the film "a blast of quiet chilly melancholy". Michael Calleri at the Niagara Gazette wrote: "Aulakh's exceptional movie explores the emptiness that shadows so many lives. A fleeting image can take on a powerful meaning. What are people, really, than what they choose to reveal to others?". Calleri further mentioned the divisive nature of the film with: "Movies like this either wrap moviegoers in a welcome cocoon of anticipation, or they falter due to cryptic inferences that don't quite come together. Aulakh succeeds".

- Nominated – Grand Jury Prize, Riviera International Film Festival (Italy)
- Nominated - Jury Prize, Best Director (Angad Aulakh), Riviera International Film Festival (Italy)
- Nominated - Jury Prize, Best Actress (Marta Gastini), Riviera International Film Festival (Italy)
- Nominated - Jury Prize, Best Actor (Guy Kent), Riviera International Film Festival (Italy)
- Nominated – Best Film, Cinema Scandinavia Awards (Norway)
