= Riviera International Film Festival =

Film festival in Sestri Levante, Italy

- Location: Sestri Levante, Liguria, Italy
- Founded: 2017
- Awards: Best Movie, Best Director, Best Actor, Best Actress, Best Documentary, Grand Jury Prize, Career Award, Icon Award
- No. of films: Official Competition: 10 films by directors under 35 / 6 feature documentaries on the environment
- Language: International
- Website: rivierafilm.org

The Riviera International Film Festival (RIFF) is an annual film festival held in Sestri Levante, Italy, which previews new films of various genres from around the world.

== History ==
The Riviera International Film Festival was first held in late April 2017. The inaugural directors were Los Angeles-based Stefano Gallini-Durante along with locally-based Vito D'Onghia.

Since 2018, each annual edition being held in May. The 10th edition of the festival took place in May 2026, with many of the films in competition having their Italian premieres at the festival.

== Description ==
The invitation-only festival is held annually at the end of April/beginning of May. The festival's Official Competition is reserved for selected works by directors under 35 and for feature documentaries on the environment and climate change. The festival also provides opportunities networking, as it hosts conferences, meetings, and workshops.

Awards are given for Best Movie, Best Director, Best Actor, Best Actress, Best Documentary, Grand Jury Prize, Career Award, Icon Award.

== Jury ==
An international jury composed of a president and various film, culture, and art personalities, who determine the prizes for the feature films in the competition.

Year	Jury president	Jury members	Testimonial
2017	David Franzoni	Marton Csokas, Gianni Quaranta, Valentina Lodovini, Marta Perego	Alessandra Mastronardi
2018	Matthew Modine	Violante Placido, Ed Solomon, John Campisi, Paola Jacobbi, Dr. Nigel Tapper, Cote De Pablo, Gaia Trussardi	Marta Perego
2019	J. Miles Dale	Joséphine de La Baume, Nils Hartmann, Cristina Donadio, Eddy Moretti, Yalitza Aparicio, Silvia Locatelli, Vincenzo Venuto	Stella Egitto

== Selection ==
=== 2017 ===
- It's Only the End of the World (Dir. Xavier Dolan; Producers Xavier Dolan, Sylvain Corbell, Nancy Grant, Elisha Karmitz, Nathanaël Karmitz, Michel Merkt; Cast Nathalie Baye, Marion Cotillard, Vincent Cassel, Léa Seydoux, Gaspard Ulliel)
- Embrace of the Serpent (Dir. Ciro Guerra; Producer Cristina Gallego; Cast Nilbio Torres, Jan Bijvoet, Antonio Bolivar, Brionne Davis)
- Autumn Lights (Dir. Angad Aulakh; Producers Guy Kent, Angad Aulakh, Ashley M. Kent, David Oskar Olafsson, Arni Filippusson; Cast Guy Kent, Marta Gastini)
- Sami Blood (Dir. Amanda Kernell; Producer Lars G. Lindstrom; Cast Lene Cecilia Sparrok, Mia Sparrok, Maj Doris Rimpi, Olle Sarri)
- Marija (Dir. Michael Koch; Producers Christoph Friedel, Claudia Steffen; Cast Margarita Breitkreiz, Georg Friedrich, Sahin Eryilmaz)
- Baden Baden (Dir. Rachel Lang; Producers Valérie Bournonville, Pierre-Louis Cassou, Jeremy Forn, Joseph Rouschop; Cast Salome Richard, Claude Gensac, Lazare Gousseau)
- I Was a Dreamer (Dir. Michele Vannucci; Producer Giovanni Pompilli; Cast Mirko Frezza, Alessandro Borghi, Vittorio Viviani)
- As I Open My Eyes (Dir. Leyla Bouzid; Producers Sandra da Fonesca, Imed Marzouk; Cast Baya Medhaffer, Ghalia Benali, Montassar Ayari)
- Our Last (Dir. Ludovico di Martino; Producers Alessandro Amato, Ludovico Di Martini, Gabriele Luppi; Cast Fabrizio Colica, Guglielmo Poggi, Giobbe Covatta)
- Out of Love (Dir. Paloma Aguilera; Producers Arnold Heslenfeld, Laurette Schillings, Frans Van Gestel; Cast Naomi Velissariou, Daniil Vorobyev)

== Awards ==
=== In competition ===
2017 Winners

- Grand Jury Prize for Best Picture – Embrace of the Serpent by Ciro Guerra
- Jury Prize for Best Director – Amanda Kernell for Sami Blood
- Jury Prize for Best Actor – Daniil Vorobyov for Out of Love
- Jury Prize for Best Actress – Baya Medhaffer for As I Open My Eyes
- Special Mention Award – Baden Baden

2017 Nominees

- Best Director
  - Xavier Dolan for It's Only the End of the World
  - Ciro Guerra for Embrace of the Serpent
  - Angad Aulakh for Autumn Lights
  - Michael Koch for Marija
  - Rachel Lang for Baden Baden
  - Michel Vannucci for I Was A Dreamer
  - Leyla Bouzid for As I Open My Eyes
  - Ludovico di Martino for Our Last
  - Paloma Aguilera for Out of Love
- Best Actress
  - Nathalie Baye for It's Only the End of the World
  - Léa Seydoux for It's Only the End of the World
  - Marion Cotillard for It's Only the End of the World
  - Marta Gastini for Autumn Lights
  - Lene Cecilia Sparrok for Sami Blood
  - Margarita Breitkreiz for Marija
  - Salomé Richard for Baden Baden
  - Mia Erika Sparrok for Sami Blood
  - Naomi Velissariou for Out of Love
- Best Actor
  - Vincent Cassel for It's Only the End of the World
  - Gaspard Ulliel for It's Only the End of the World
  - Guy Kent for Autumn Lights
  - Olle Sarri for Sami Blood
  - Georg Friedrich for Marija
  - Mirko Frezzo for Our Last
  - Lazare Gousseau for Baden Baden
  - Ayari Montassar for As I Open My Eyes
  - Fabrizio Colica for Our Last

== See also ==
- Venice Biennale
- Venice Film Festival
- Cannes Film Festival
- Berlin International Film Festival
