= Hreinn Beck =

Icelandic film producer

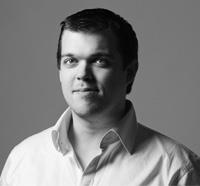
- Born: Reykjavík, Iceland
- Occupations: Producer; Founder, Mystery Ísland; Founder Netfrelsi, CTO, Netvarpið

Hreinn Beck is a film and television producer, academic and political activist who has advocated for reduced restrictions on copyright and patents.

== Film and theatrical career ==
In 1998 Beck started work in theatre and opened the production company Mystery Ísland in 2006 with Árni Filippusson and Davíð Óskar Ólafsson. Together they have produced feature films such as Sveitabrúðkaup (Country Wedding), Kóngavegur (King's Road) and Á annan veg (Either Way) which was later remade into an American version, Prince Avalanche by David Gordon Green featuring Paul Rudd and Emile Hirsch.

Beck has created and produced concerts and variety programs programmes for Icelandic television featured on the channels Rúv, Stöð 2 and Skjár Einn. His Söngkeppni Framhaldsskólanna have ratings of over 118.000, just about half the population of Iceland, a record for Stöð 2, the largest privately owned broadcaster in Iceland.

== Political career ==
In 2005, Beck started the organization Netfrelsi, an Icelandic version of the Electronic Frontier Foundation. The name Netfrelsi is a combination of Internet 'net' and 'frelsi' (freedom in Icelandic). The cause for Netfrelsi's establishment is believed to stem from the first police action against file sharers in Iceland. Beck had been a spokesperson for a file sharing group called Deilir, which at its peak had over 30,000 users, more than ten percent of Icelandic adults. In his role as a spokesperson he met with opponents in television interviews, wrote articles, amicus briefs and gave testimony to the Alþingi (Icelandic Parliament).

As a television producer he has worked with musical acts like Björk, Sigur Rós, Mezzoforte, Ghostigital, Ólöf Arnalds and Sálin hans Jóns míns. Foreign acts include Eric Clapton, Sophie Ellis-Bextor, Damien Rice and James Blunt. Notably he produced the Nattura concert featuring Björk and Sigur Rós which was broadcast online in cooperation with Apple and National Geographic. Hreinn also produced and directed the Björk at Langholtskirkja concert which was a part of Björk's Volta tour and DVD collection. He was also the technical supervisor of Sigur Rós's documentary, Heima, which was the first Icelandic documentary produced in HD.

== Selected filmography ==
=== Producer ===
- Íslendingur í Tyrklandi - documentary (2005)
- Skröltormar - short film (2007)
- Njáll - short film (2007)
- Skrekkur - TV (2008)
- Kraftur - documentary (2008)
- Sveitabrúðkaup (Country Wedding) - feature film (2008)
- Hnappurinn - short film (2008)
- Góða Ferð - short film (2008)
- Skrekkur - variety show (2009)
- Söngkeppni Framhaldsskólanna - TV (2009)
- Kóngavegur - feature film (2009)
- Samfés - TV (2010)
- Skrekkur - TV (2010)
- Paradox - documentary (2010)
- Iceland Hour - Inspired by Iceland - TV (2010)
- Samfés - TV (2011)
- Litlir Hlutir - short film (2011)
- Mið Ísland - TV series (2011)
- Á annan veg - feature film (2011)
- Málmhaus - feature film (2013)

=== Director ===
- Voltaïc : Volta and Medúlla Live in Reykjavík - Björk live at Langholtskirkja - concert film (2009)
