= Hörður Áskelsson =

Icelandic organist and conductor (born 1953)

Hörður Áskelsson (born 22 November 1953) is an Icelandic organist and choir conductor. He was cantor at Hallgrímskirkja church for nearly 40 years and was the founder and conductor of the Hallgrímskirkja Motet Choir and Schola Cantorum Reykjavicensis.

== Career ==
Hörður Áskelsson began his music studies at age 7 in his hometown of Akureyri. He graduated from the Akureyri Junior College (Menntaskólinn á Akureyri) in 1973 and studied at the Reykjavík College of Music until 1975, completing degrees in organ and music education. From 1976 to 1981 he studied at the Robert Schumann Conservatory in Düsseldorf, completing his A-exam in church music with distinction.

In 1982, Hörður was hired as organist and cantor at Hallgrímskirkja Church. He founded the Hallgrímskirkja Motet Choir in 1982, and the chamber choir Schola Cantorum in 1996. He led the public funding drive to build a new 72-stop Klais organ in Hallgrímskirkja, which was inaugurated in December 1992.

As conductor and organist, Hörður has been among Iceland's most prolific and renowned musicians. He has conducted all the major choral works, including the St John Passion and St Matthew Passion, Mass in B minor and Christmas Oratorio by J.S. Bach, Requiem by W.A. Mozart, Handel's Messiah, and many others. He has also premiered many Icelandic compositions, including the oratorio Cecilia by Áskell Másson, Passía (Passion) by Hafliði Hallgrímsson, and The Gospel of Mary by Hugi Guðmundsson. Hörður also prepared the Hallgrímskirkja choirs in performances of large choral works by Jón Leifs, which have been recorded on the BIS Records label, including the oratorios Edda I and Edda II.

Hörður Áskelsson has received many awards and honors for his musical work. In 2004 was made Commander of the Order of the Falcon by the president of Iceland for his work on behalf of music in Iceland. He was appointed Honorary Artist of the City of Reykjavík in 2002, and received the Icelandic Optimism Prize in 2006. In 2024, he received the Lifetime Achievement Award at the Icelandic Music Awards.

In 2021 Hörður announced his departure from Hallgrímskirkja church, following years of dispute with the church's board of directors. The choirs continued to perform under his direction in Harpa Concert Hall, including his final concert with the Motet Choir, in November 2022.

== Selected recordings ==
- Icelandic Church Music. Hallgrímskirkja Motet Choir, 1990.
- Jónas Tómasson: Dýrð Krists (The Glory of Christ). Tónlistarfélag Ísafjarðar, 1997.
- Maurice Duruflé: Requiem. Hallgrímskirkja Motet Choir. Bella Musica, 1997.
- Ljósið þitt lýsi mér. Hallgrímskirkja Motet Choir, 2008.
- Hafliði Hallgrímsson: Passía. Hallgrímskirkja Motet Choir and Chamber Orchestra. Ondine, 2003.
- Hafliði Hallgrímsson: Choral Works. Schola Cantorum Reykjavicensis. Resonus, 2013.
- Meditatio. Music for Mixed Choir. Schola Cantorum. BIS Records, 2016.
- Meditatio II. Music for Mixed Choir. Schola Cantorum. BIS Records, 2023.
- Hugi Guðmundsson: The Gospel of Mary. Schola Cantorum, Århus Sinfonietta. Dacapo Records, 2023.
