= Laura Orsini =

Italian noblewoman (1492-1530)

- Lady of Carbognano
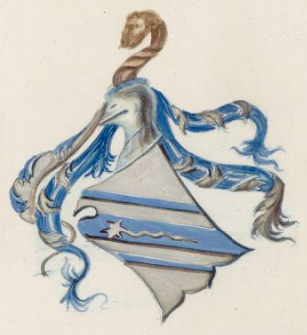
- Coat of arms
- Reign: 31 July 1500-1530
- Predecessor: Orsino Orsini
- Successor: Giulio della Rovere
- Born: 30 November 1492; Rome
- Died: 1530 (aged 37–38); Rome
- Noble family: Orsini (legal fatherhood); Farnese (motherhood); Della Rovere (marriage); Borgia (supposed natural fatherhood)
- Spouse: Nicola Franciotti della Rovere (m. 1505)
- Issue: Giulio della Rovere; Lavinia della Rovere; Elena della Rovere
- Father: Orsino Orsini (legal father); Pope Alexander VI Borgia (supposed natural father)
- Mother: Giulia Farnese

Laura Orsini, Lady of Carbognano (Rome, 30 November 1492 - Rome, 1530) was an Italian noblewoman, daughter of Giulia Farnese and, presumably, of her lover Pope Alexander VI Borgia.

== Biography ==
Laura Orsini was born in Rome, Italy, on 30 November 1492. She was the only child of Giulia Farnese (Pope Paul III's sister). Her paternity is instead controversial: the baby girl was declared daughter of Giulia's legitimate husband, Orsino Orsini, however, at the time of her birth, Giulia was notoriously the lover of Pope Alexander VI Borgia, and later she declared that her daughter was born from this relationship, although Borgia never recognized or cared for Laura, unlike what he did for his other children. The question is currently being debated.

On 2 April 1499 at Palazzo Farnese, Laura was promised in marriage to Federico Farnese, son of Raimondo Farnese and nephew of Pier Paolo Farnese. The engagement was later dissolved.

On 16 November 1505, she married Nicola Franciotti della Rovere, with a dowry of 300,000 ducats. The marriage had been organized by Pope Julius II della Rovere, the groom's uncle and successor and enemy of Alexander VI, who wished to ally himself with the Farnese and Orsini families. The couple had three children: Giulio (died c. 1550); Lavinia (c. 1521 - 26 July 1601), who married Paolo Orsini di Mentana; and Elena, who married Stefano Colonna, prince of Palestrina.

From her legal father, Orsino, Laura received the Carbognano fiefdom as gift, which was then inherited by her son, and when Giulio died without issue, it was inherited by her daughter Lavinia. Laura died in Rome in 1530, at around thirty-eight years of age.
