= Jordan Goldnadel =

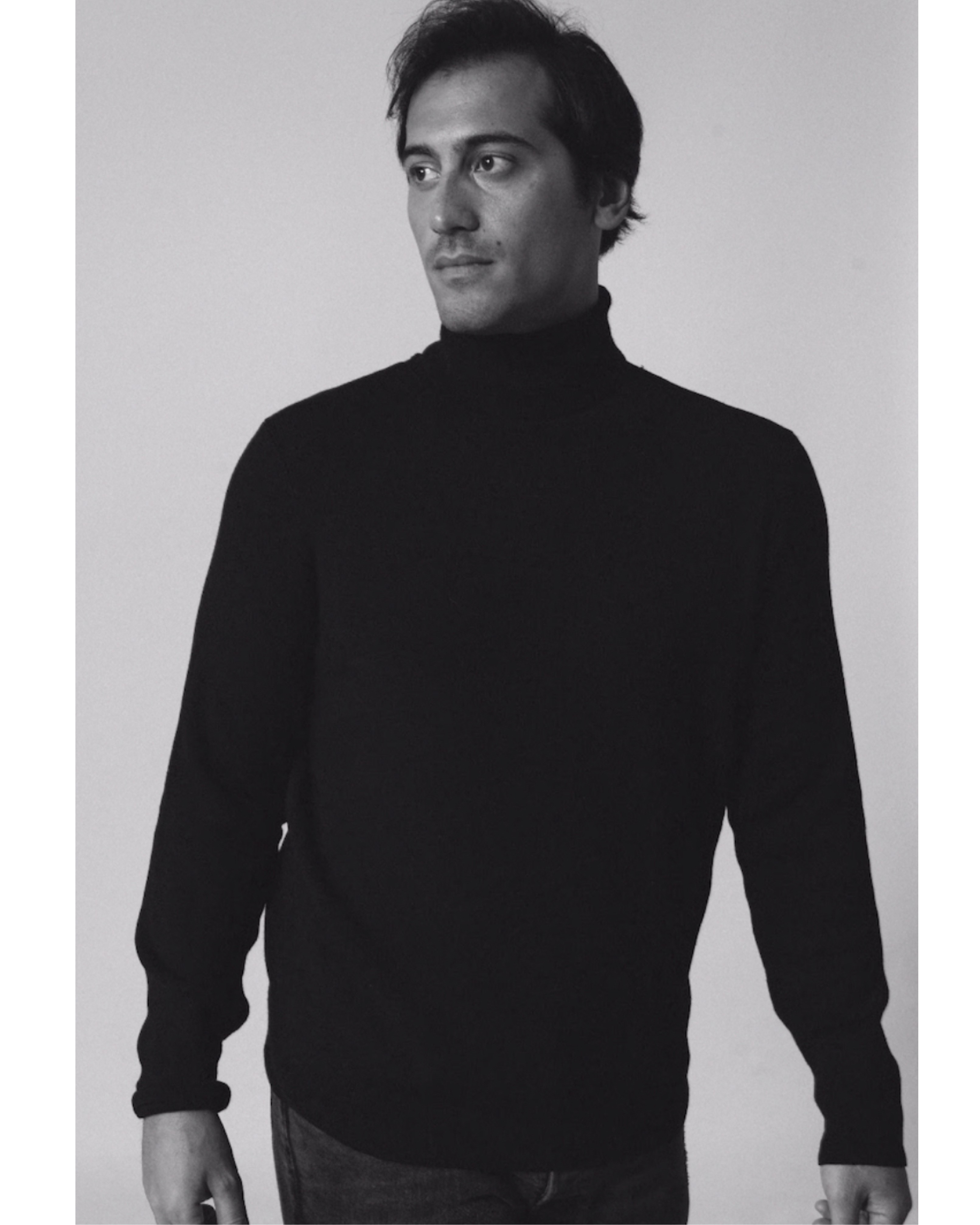
- Jordan Goldnadel
- Born: 29 June 1989 (age 37); Paris, France
- Occupations: Actor, Director, Screenwriter, Producer

Jordan Goldnadel (born 29 June 1989 in Paris (France)) is a director, screenwriter, producer and actor.

== Childhood and education ==
Jordan Goldnadel was born and raised in Paris, where he studied acting at the prestigious Cours Florent. After graduating from High School Goldnadel moved to the US to study filmmaking and production at NYU's Tisch School of the Arts. He also has a master's degree in Public Policy and is a certified international mediator from the United States Peace Institute.

== Career ==
He first directs several short films that screen at numerous film festivals around the world. At the end of his studies, and after having worked at Focus Features, NBCUniversal, he starts his own production company The Third Generation, member of Unifrance, based in Paris and with which he works on international projects.

At 23, he writes, produces, directs and acts in his first feature film, Happy, which premiered at the Montréal World Film Festival, where it received great reviews. With a great soundtrack, including some Amanda Palmer songs, the film is sold internationally by Wide Management and receives two nominations at the prestigious 2016 Prix Henri Langlois (Henri Langlois Awards) The film also integrates the Eye on Films European Label and is released in several countries including the US, the UK, Ireland and South Korea.

In 2015, Goldnadel directs And then, Violence, which he co-wrote with Florence Chouraqui Suissa. The short film deals with the rise of violence and racist hate in France in the lights of the Charlie Hebdo shooting and Kosher Supermarket terror attacks in Paris that occurred in January of the same year. The film is selected at numerous festivals and picked up for distribution in the US by 7th Art Releasing.

The following year, he acts in and directs the second unit of the American-Icelandic co-production Autumn Lights, directed by Angad Aulakh. He also co-directs and produces a short film called Lola & Eddie with Lola Bessis et Tom Leeb.

In 2017, he co-produces Nathan Silver's feature film Thirst Street, which premiered at the Tribeca Film Festival and screened at the Venice Film Festival and Toronto International Film Festival. The film stars Anjelica Huston, Lyndsay Burdge, Esther Garrel, Damien Bonnard, Lola Bessis and Alice de Lencquesaing. It's released in the US by Samuel Goldwyn.

In 2018, he directs the film Chechnya, which deals with the horrific treatment of homosexuals in Chechnya for the French TV channel France 3. The film is selected and many films festivals internationally, and wins several awards.

In 2023, he's one of the producers of Weston Razooli debut feature, Riddle of Fire, that premiered at the Cannes Film Festival's Directors' Fortnight and was screened at the Toronto International Film Festival.

In 2025, Jordan founds the A.I. animation studio AiSpasia, based in New York and releases the first ever 100% A.I. generated animated series, Léon in New York

== Filmography ==
=== As a director ===
- 2013: The boy & The Chess Player
- 2015: Happy
- 2016: And then, Violence*
- 2016: Lola & Eddie (co-directed with Charlotte Karas)*
- 2016: Autumn Lights de Angad Aulakh (Second Unit Director)
- 2018: Chechnya*

*also editor.
