= Thora Bjorg Helga =

Icelandic actress (born 1989)

- Born: Þorbjörg Helga Þorgilsdóttir; 16 April 1989 (age 37); Reykjavík, Iceland
- Occupation: Actress
- Years active: 2011–present
- Notable work: Metalhead

Thora Bjorg Helga (born Þorbjörg Helga Þorgilsdóttir; 16 April 1989) is an Icelandic actress best known for starring in Ragnar Bragason's Metalhead. Helga won the 2014 Icelandic Academy Award for Best Actress for her role in the film which premiered at the Toronto International Film Festival in September 2013. She also starred in Baltasar Kormákur's film The Deep in 2013, earning her a 2013 Icelandic Academy Award Best Supporting Actress nomination. Helga also starred in the American film Autumn Lights.

For her role in Metalhead, Helga garnered unanimous acclaim for what The New York Times called "remarkable", playing a grief-stricken young woman in Iceland. The Village Voice concluded that Helga was "commanding in the grief-stricken lead role, nailing not only the power stances and other musical affectations the character demands but, more pressingly, the permeating sorrow".

== Filmography ==
Year	Title	Role	Director	Note
2017	Fangar	Linda	Ragnar Bragason	TV Mini Series
2016	Patient Seven	Girlfriend	Ómar Örn Hauksson	
2016	Autumn Lights	Eva	Angad Aulakh	
2014	Brave Men's Blood (Borgríki 2)	Ragna	Olaf de Fleur	
2013	Metalhead (Málmhaus)	Hera	Ragnar Bragason	
2012	Sacrifice	Gabriella	Jakob Halldorsson	Short (15m)
2012	The Deep (Djúpið)	Halla	Baltasar Kormákur	
2011	Litlir hlutir	Ásta	Davíd Óskar Ólafsson	Short (15m)
2011	Ódauðleg ást	The Girlfriend	Ómar Örn Hauksson	Short (12m)
