= Giulia Farnese =

Mistress to Pope Alexander VI

Donna Giulia Farnese
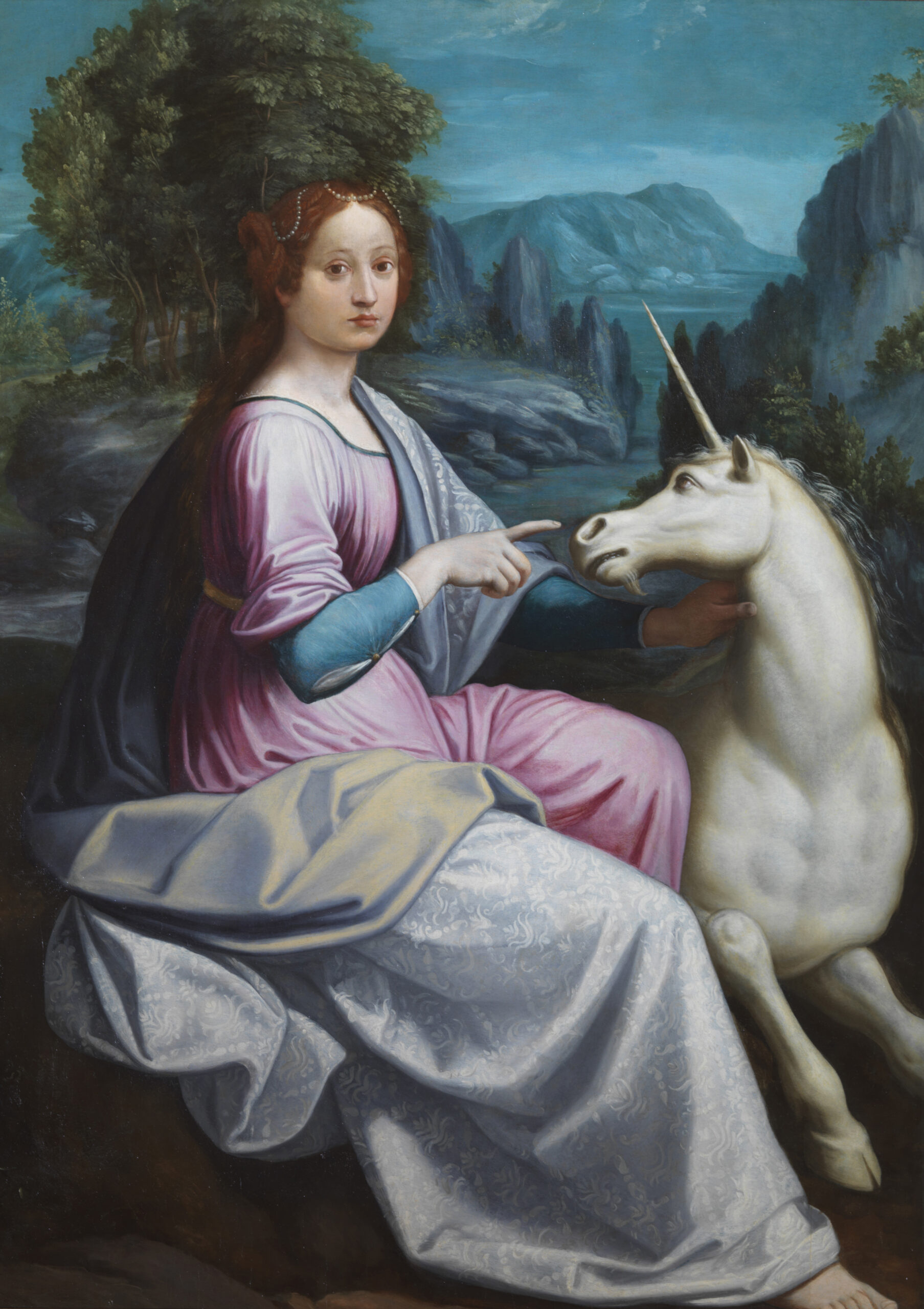
- Lady with a Unicorn, by Luca Longhi, 1535–1540, possibly a portrait of Giulia Farnese.

Governor at Carbognano
- In office 1506–1522
- Monarchs: Julius II (1506–1513); Leo X (1513–1521); Adrian VI (1521–1522)
- Preceded by: Orsino Orsini
- Succeeded by: Laura Orsini

Personal details
- Born: 1474 Canino, Papal States
- Died: March 23, 1524 (aged 49–50) Rome, Papal States
- Spouse(s): Orsino Orsini (m. 1489; died 1500) Giovanni Capece Bozzuto di Afragola
- Relations: Pope Alexander VI (lover)
- Children: Laura Orsini (fatherhood disputed)
- Parent(s): Pier Luigi Farnese; Giovanna Caetani

Giulia Farnese (Italian pronunciation: [ˈdʒuːlja farˈneːze, -eːse]; 1474 – 23 March 1524) was an Italian noblewoman, a mistress to Pope Alexander VI, and the sister of Pope Paul III. Known as Giulia la Bella (Italian for 'Julia the Beautiful'), she was a member of the noble Farnese family, who were prominent leaders in the Italian regions of Parma and Piacenza. After marrying into the noble Orsini family in the Papal States, Farnese soon acquainted herself with, and initiated an affair with, the Spanish Cardinal Rodrigo Borgia. When the cardinal was elected Pope, Farnese continued the increasingly advantageous liaison, which enabled her to have her brother Alessandro made a cardinal, until losing Alexander's favor at the turn of the century.

Farnese spent most of her later years governing the castle of Carbognano, previously a property which Alexander had given to her husband. She died in 1524 in Rome at the residence belonging to Alessandro, who would later be elected Pope Paul III.

Lorenzo Pucci described her as "most lovely to behold". Cesare Borgia, the son of Alexander VI, described her as having "dark colouring, black eyes, round face and a particular ardor".

== Biography ==
=== Family ===
Giulia Farnese was born in Canino, then within the Papal States, to Pier Luigi I Farnese (c. 1435 - November 1487), Lord of Capodimonte, Musignano, Valentano, Gradoli, Piansano, Canino and Abbazia al Ponte, Papal Vicar of Canino in 1466, and his wife (Ischia, March 1464) Giovanna called Giovannella Caetani of the Dukes of Sermoneta, a member of the Caetani family which had produced Pope Gelasius II and Pope Boniface VIII, and paternal granddaughter of Ranuccio Farnese the Elder, and wife Agnese Monaldeschi. Giulia had four siblings. Her older brother, Alessandro, was a notary who embarked on an ecclesiastical career. Her granduncle, Bartolomeo, became Lord of Montalto in Alessandro's place, married Iolanda Monaldeschi, and had issue. Her eldest brother, Angelo, was a lord, married Lella Orsini, and had female issue. Her other siblings were sisters, Girolama and Beatrice (Canino, 1469 - Viterbo, 1507), Benedictine nun in 1480, Abbess of San Bernardino Monastery of Viterbo in 1490.

At the age of fourteen, Giulia was sent to Rome by her mother in order to complete an education in the hopes of integrating herself into the Roman aristocracy.

=== First marriage and papal concubinage ===
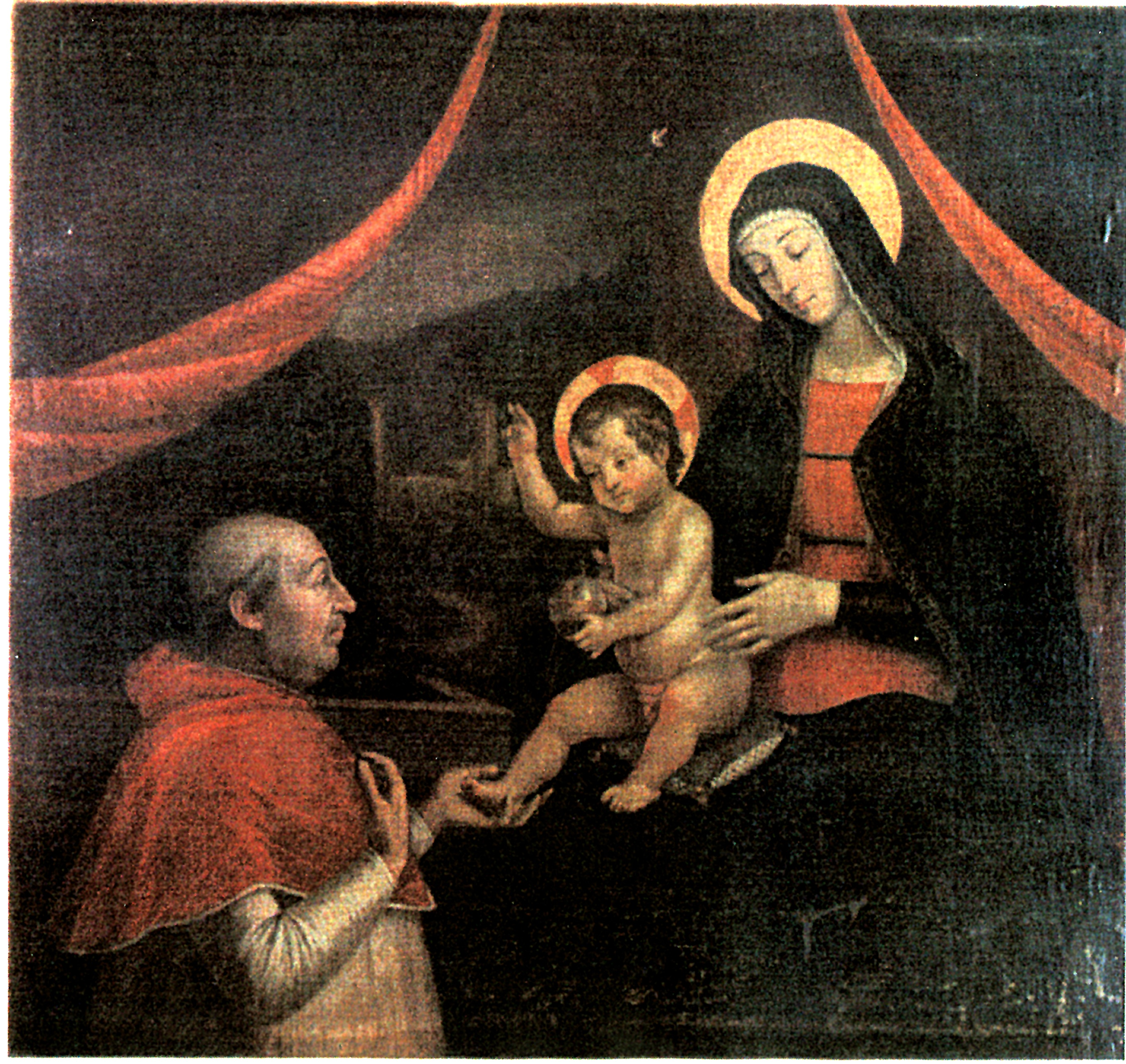
Pope Alexander VI kneeling in front of the Madonna, said to be a likeness of Giulia Farnese. (Note: Doubtful, but possible. On a similar claim: "Without any solid evidence Giulia is said to have been the model for Pinturicchio's 'Virgin and Child' surrounded by angels in the Borgia Apartments of the Vatican.")

On 21 May 1489, Giulia married Orsino Orsini in Rome (the signing of the marriage contract had taken place the previous day). Her dowry for the match was 3,000 gold florins (around US$500,000). Orsini, who was described as being squint-eyed and devoid of any meaningful self-confidence, was the son of Adriana de Milà, a third cousin of Cardinal Rodrigo Borgia, who was then Vice-Chancellor of the Church. According to Maria Bellonci, it is uncertain when Rodrigo Borgia (Pope Alexander VI) fell in love with Giulia and decided to make her his mistress. What is known is that Adriana de Mila eventually gave her approval to Rodrigo Borgia and Giulia Farnese's relationship in order to win a higher status for her son within the Vatican. By November 1493, Giulia was living with Adriana de Mila and the Pope's daughter Lucrezia Borgia, who she became a friend of, in a recently built palace next to the Vatican from where the Pope could easily make his clandestine visits. The affair was widely rumored among gossips of the time, and Giulia was referred to as "the Pope's whore" or sarcastically as "the bride of Christ".

Giulia enriched herself as a result of her relationship with the Pope. For instance, Lorenzo Pucci noted in 1494 that "she has an intent goldsmith that makes rings for one thousand ducati". Through her intimacy with the Pope, Giulia was able to get her brother Alessandro (the future Pope Paul III) created Cardinal in 1493. Even so, Alessandro had a precarious financial situation. Records from the Apostolic Chamber from autumn of 1500 put Alessandro's annual income at just two thousand ducats, making him one of the poorest members of the Sacred College. Consequently, Giulia almost certainly helped sustain her brother financially, enabling him to purchase Cardinal Pedro Ferris' Roman palace in early 1495 for 5,500 ducats - a purchase otherwise outside of Alessandro's means.

On 30 November 1492 Giulia gave birth to a baby girl who was named Laura. It is not clear whether Laura's father was Orsino or Pope Alexander. Maria Bellonci believes that there is evidence that she did have a physical relationship with her husband. Whatever the case may be, Giulia claimed that Laura was indeed the Pope's daughter, but this may have been to raise the status of the child for future marriage considerations. In 1494, she angered the Pope by setting off to Capodimonte to be at the deathbed of her brother Angelo. She remained away from Rome, even after her brother's death, at the insistence of her husband. He eventually capitulated to papal pressure, however, and she soon set off on the journey back to her lover. This occurred at the same time as the French invasion of Italy under Charles VIII. Giulia was captured by the French captain Yves d’Allegre, who demanded from the Pope, and received, a ransom of 3,000 scudi for her safe conduct to Rome.

Giulia remained close to the Pope until 1499 or 1500. At this time, she seems to have fallen out of his favour. Bellonci believes that the break between the two was probably made amicably with the help of Adriana de Mila. Her husband Orsino also died prematurely in 1500. She then moved to Carbognano, which is not far from Rome. This town's castle had been given to Orsino by Alexander VI.

=== Second marriage and later life ===
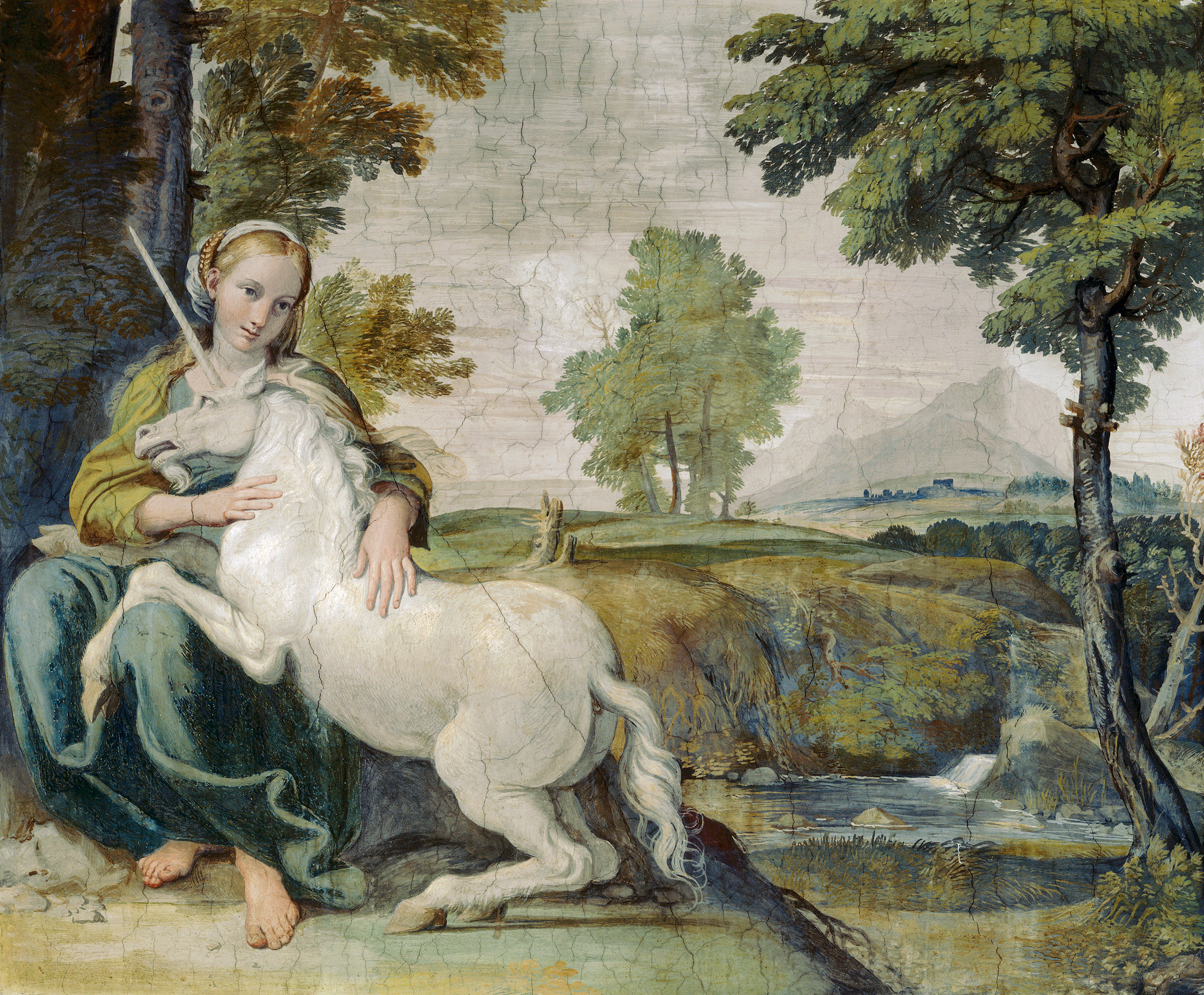
Giulia Farnese depicted in the painting, A Virgin with a Unicorn, by Domenichino, c. 1604–05, Palazzo Farnese.

Giulia returned to Rome in 1505 for the wedding of her daughter Laura to Niccolò Franciotti della Rovere, Lord of Gallese, who was the brother of Cardinal Galeotto Franciotti della Rovere and the son of Laura della Rovere, sister of the then-incumbent Pope Julius II. For Giulia, the time of love was not over. In the first years of her widowhood, after a series of lovers whose names have not been recorded, she married Giovanni Capece-Bozzuto, Baron of Afragola and Lord of Balsorano, Patrician of Naples, a member of the lower ranking Neapolitan nobility. In 1506, Giulia became the governor of Carbognano. Giulia took up residence in the citadel of the castle; years later, her name was inscribed on its gate. The chronicle of the castle states that Giulia was an able administrator who governed in a firm and energetic manner. Her second husband died there in 1517. Giulia stayed in Carbognano until 1522; she then returned to Rome.

=== Death ===
In early 1524, Giulia, apparently sensing that death was near, had her testament written on 14 March in her room, overlooking the church of San Girolamo, in the Arenula district of Rome. Giulia died there, in the house of her brother, Cardinal Alessandro. She was 50 years old. The cause of her death is unknown. Ten years later her brother ascended the papal throne as Pope Paul III. Laura and Niccolò had three children, a son Giulio (d. 1550) and two daughters Lavinia (1521–1601), who inherited the possessions of the Orsini family, and Elena, who married Stefano Colonna, prince of Palestrina.

== In popular culture ==
In the 2011 Showtime television series The Borgias, Giulia is played by Lotte Verbeek.

In the 2011 Canal+ television series Borgia, Giulia is played by Marta Gastini.

Giulia is the protagonist of Kate Quinn's book series, The Borgia Chronicles.

== Ancestry ==
Ancestors of Giulia Farnese

16. Ranuccio Farnese, Signore di Montalto
8. Pietro Farnese, Signore di Montalto
17. Pantasilea Salimbeni
4. Ranuccio Farnese, Count of Pitigliano
18. Giovanni Dolci, Conte di Corbara
9. Pantasilea Dolci
19.
2. Pier Luigi Farnese, Signore di Montalto
20.
10. Angelo Monaldeschi della Cervara
21.
5. Agnese Monaldeschi della Cervara
22.
11.
23.
1. Giulia Farnese
24. Giacobello Caetani
12. Giacomo Caetani, Signore di Sermoneta
25. Rosa d'Eboli
6. Onorato Caetani, Duke of Sermoneta
26. Pirro Orsini, Count of Nola
13. Giovanella Orsini
27.
3. Giovanna Caetani
28. Giovanni Orsini, Signore di Galera
14. Francesco Orsini, Duke of Gravina
29. Bartolomea Spinelli
7. Caterina Orsini
30. Ugone Scilliato
15. Flavia Scilliato
31. Rita di Molise

== Sources ==
- de la Bédoyère, Michael (1958). The Meddlesome Friar and the Wayward Pope. London: Collins.
- Gamrath, Helge (2007). Farnese: Pomp, Power and Politics in Renaissance Italy. L'Erma" di Bretschneider.

=== Further reading ===
- Bellonci, Maria (2003). The Life and Times of Lucrezia Borgia. Phoenix. ISBN 9781842126165.
- Romei, Danilo; Rosini, Patrizia (2012). Regesto dei Documenti di Giulia Farnese. Lulu.com. ISBN 9781291001204.
- del Vecchio, Edoardo (1972). I Farnese. Rome: Istituto di Studi Romani.
- Spinosa, Antonio (1999). La Saga dei Borgia. Milan: Mondadori. ISBN 978-88-04-48662-6.
