= Vallerano =

- Comune
- Comune di Vallerano
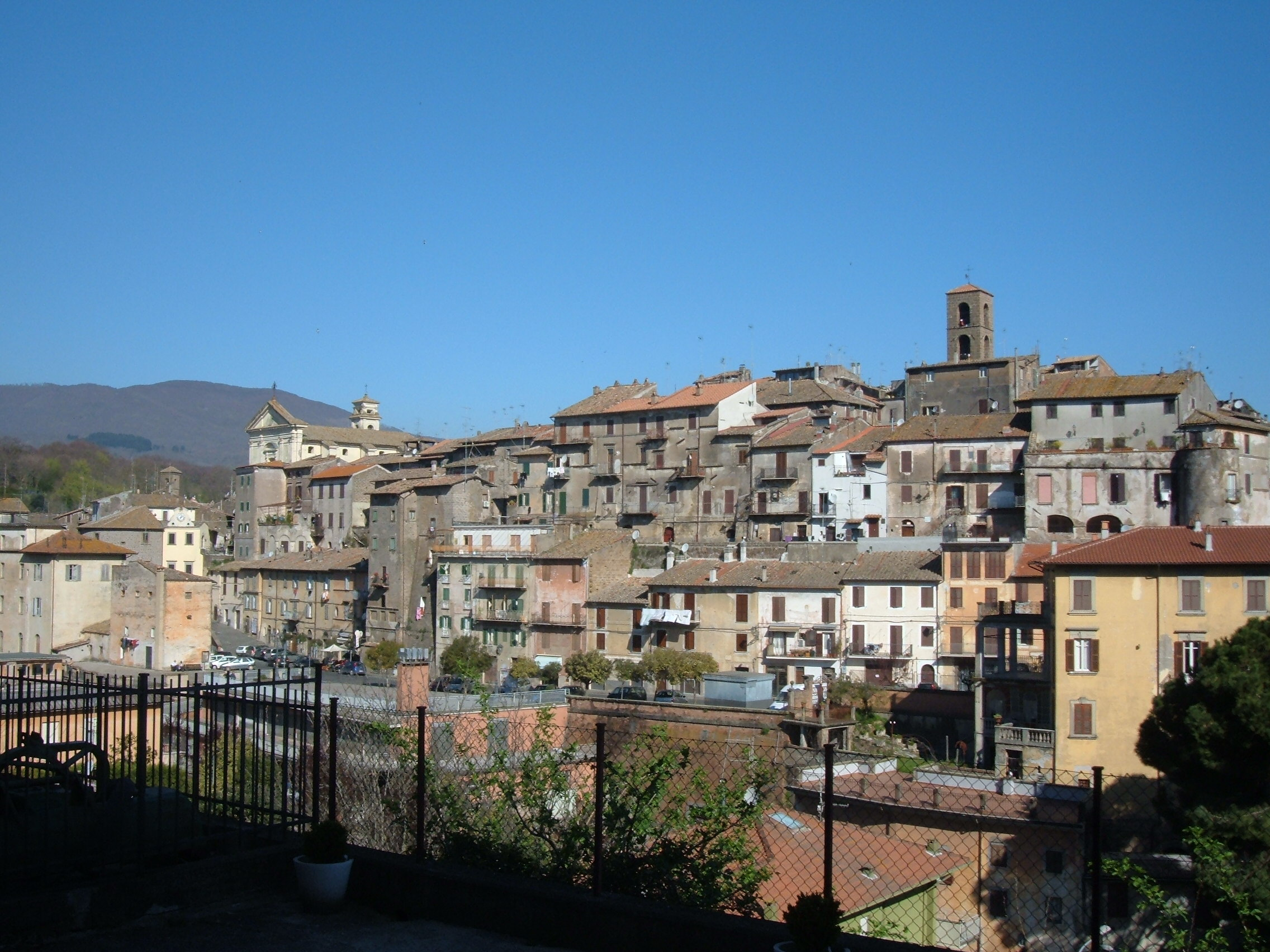

- Location within Italy Location within Lazio
- Coordinates: 42°23′N 12°15′E
- Country: Italy
- Region: Lazio
- Province: Viterbo (VT)

Government
  - Mayor: Maurizio Gregori

Area
  - Total: 15.5 km^{2} (6.0 sq mi)
- Elevation: 390 m (1,280 ft)

Population (31 December 2010)
  - Total: 2,667
  - Density: 172/km^{2} (446/sq mi)
- Demonym: Valleranesi
- Time zone: UTC+1 (CET)
  - Summer (DST): UTC+2 (CEST)
- Postal code: 01030
- Dialing code: 0761
- Website: Official website

Vallerano is a comune (municipality) in the Province of Viterbo in the Italian region of Latium, located about 60 kilometres (37 mi) northwest of Rome and about 13 kilometres (8 mi) southeast of Viterbo.

Vallerano borders the following municipalities: Canepina, Caprarola, Carbognano, Fabrica di Roma, Soriano nel Cimino, Vignanello.

Among the monumental structures in the town is the 17th century Marian shrine, the Sanctuary of the Madonna del Ruscello, also called the Santuario di Maria Santissima del Ruscello dei Donatori di Sangue.
