= Happy (2015 film) =

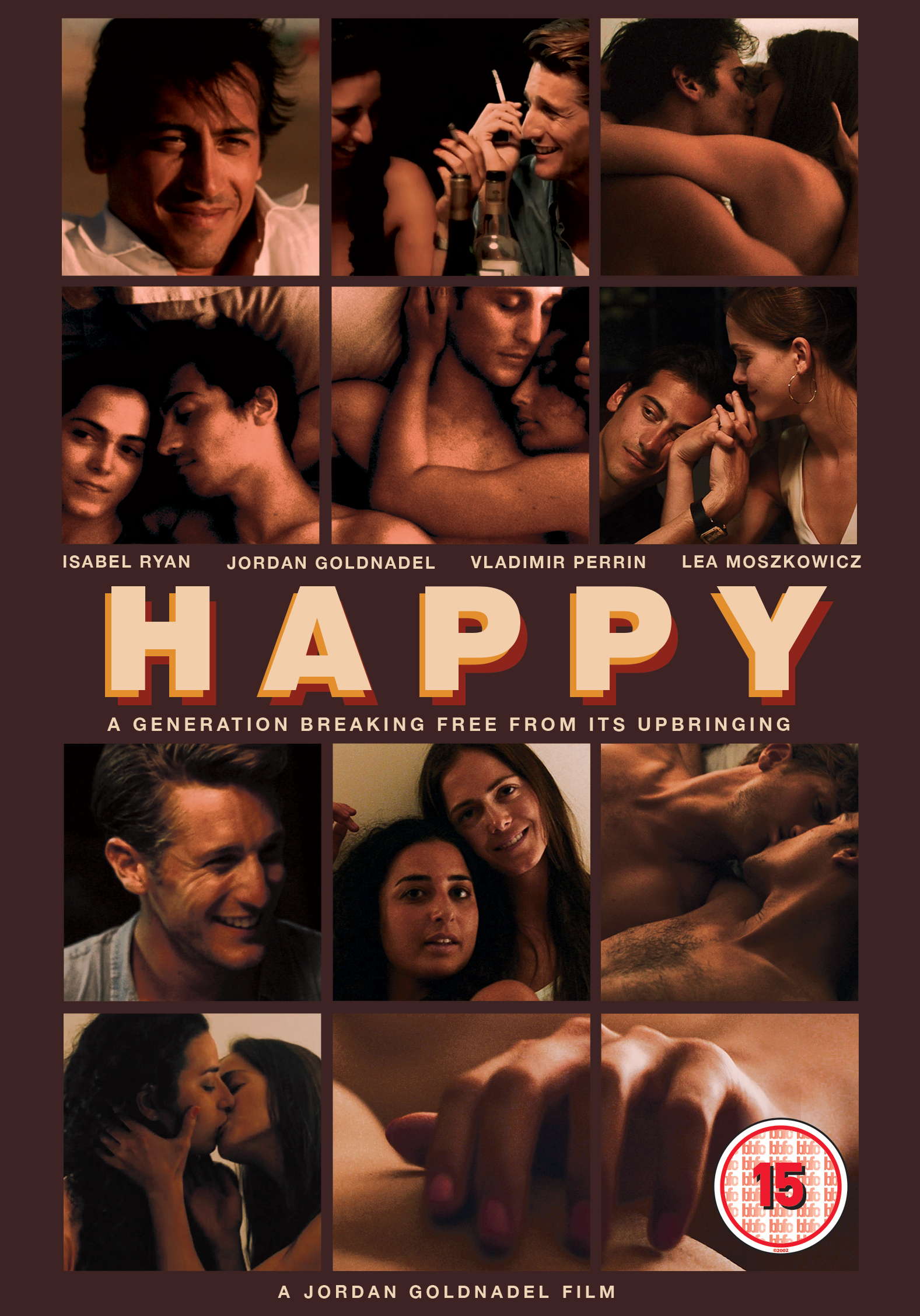
- UK poster
- Directed by: Jordan Goldnadel
- Screenplay by: Jordan Goldnadel with the help of Florence Chouraqui Suissa
- Produced by: Jordan Goldnadel; The Third Generation
- Starring: Jordan Goldnadel; Isabel Ryan; Vladimir Perrin; Lea Moszkowicz; Arthur Jalta
- Cinematography: Jean Sotelo
- Edited by: Marsha Bramwell
- Music by: Izzy Gaon
- Distributed by: Wide Management
- Release date: August 23, 2015 (Avvantura Film Festival)

Happy is a 2015 French feature film directed by Jordan Goldnadel, with Isabel Ryan, Vladimir Perrin, Jordan Goldnadel and Léa Moszkowicz.

The film showed at the 2015 Montréal World Film Festival, where it received great reviews. The film is sold internationally by Wide Management and receives two nominations at the 2016 Prix Henri Langlois (Henri Langlois Awards). The film also integrates the Eye on Films European Label and is released in several countries including the US, the UK, Ireland and South Korea.

== Synopsis ==
Alessia, a young American photographer, comes to Paris for obscure reasons. There, she meets Florent, a young bourgeois Parisian searching for purpose in his life. For one summer, they will live an intense passion, orchestrated by travels and encounters with strangers.

== Cast ==
- Jordan Goldnadel as Florent - Rich Frenchman
- Isabel Ryan as Alessia - Texas American
- Vladimir Perrin as Thomas - Waiter
- Léa Moszkowicz as Marion - Childhood friend
- Charlotte Vercoustre as Coralie
- Arthur Jalta as Louis
- Marcel Aloro as Marcel
- Marc de Panda as Marc

== Awards ==
- 2015: Prix du meilleur Film au Festival international de film de Zadar pour Happy (nommé)
- 2015: Sélection officielle au Montréal World Film Festival pour Happy
- 2016: Prix du public au Prix Henri Langlois 2016 pour Happy (nommé)
- 2016: Prix de la jeunesse au Prix Henri Langlois 2016 pour Happy (nommé)
