= Stefano Gallini-Durante =

Italian film producer

Stefano Gallini-Durante, also known as Stefano Gallini, is an Italian-born (Milan, Italy) film producer based in Los Angeles, California. He is the son of Mario Gallini, an Italian industrialist, entrepreneur, and 1960s sailing champion, and Fernanda Durante (1930–1978), an author and journalist. He is the stepson of Cristina Formenton Mondadori, daughter of Italian publishing magnate Arnoldo Mondadori, founder of Arnoldo Mondadori Editore (1906–present), the largest publishing company in Italy and one of the largest publishing companies in Europe.

Stefano Gallini-Durante is the founder of the Riviera International Film Festival (RIFF), an independent film festival that takes place annually in Sestri Levante and Portofino, Italy.
