= Fabrica di Roma =

- Comune
- Comune di Fabrica di Roma
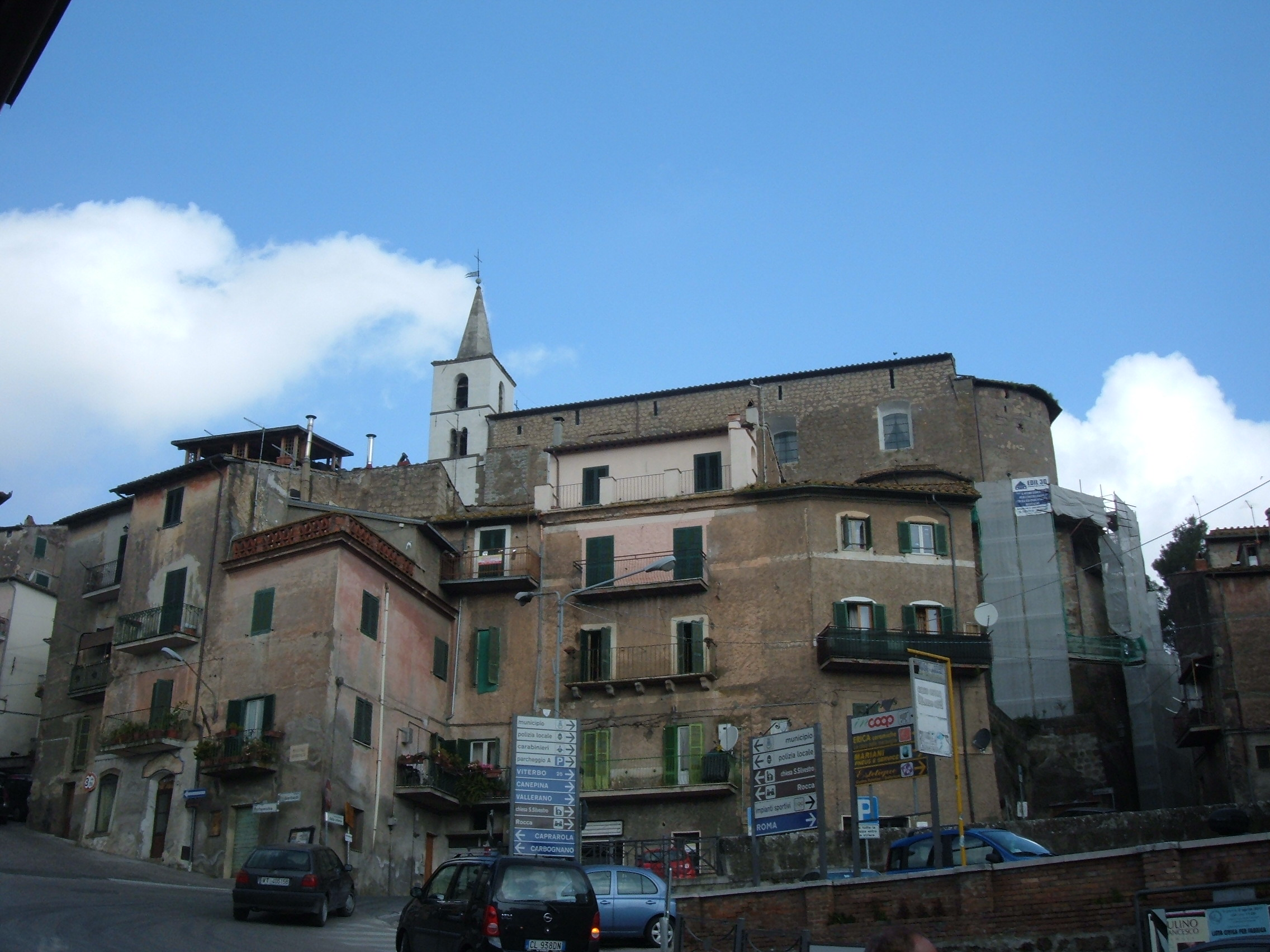

- Location within Italy Location within Lazio
- Coordinates: 42°20′N 12°17′E
- Country: Italy
- Region: Lazio
- Province: Viterbo (VT)

Government
  - Mayor: Claudio Ricci

Area
  - Total: 34.7 km^{2} (13.4 sq mi)
- Elevation: 296 m (971 ft)

Population (1 January 2012)
  - Total: 8,120
  - Density: 234/km^{2} (606/sq mi)
- Demonym: Fabrichesi
- Time zone: UTC+1 (CET)
  - Summer (DST): UTC+2 (CEST)
- Postal code: 01034
- Dialing code: 0761
- Patron saint: St. Matthew
- Saint day: September 21
- Website: http://www.comune.fabricadiroma.vt.it/

Fabrica di Roma is a comune (municipality) in the Province of Viterbo in the Italian region of Latium, located about 55 kilometres (34 mi) northwest of Rome and about 25 kilometres (16 mi) south-east of Viterbo.

Fabrica di Roma borders the following municipalities: Carbognano, Castel Sant'Elia, Civita Castellana, Corchiano, Nepi, Vallerano, Vignanello.

== Main sights ==
- Collegiata di San Silvestro, enlarged and renovated in the 16th century. In the apse is a 16th-century fresco by the Torresani brothers.
- Church of Santa Madre della Pietà, from the late 15th century
- Farnese Castle, restored in 1539 by Pierluigi Farnese, who annexed it to the Duchy of Castro.
- Ruins of Falerii Novi, with the ancient church of S. Maria in Falerii and the catacombs of S. Gratiliano and S.ta Felicissima.
