= Angad Aulakh =

American filmmaker

- Born: Angad Aulakh; 1988 (age 37–38)
- Occupations: Director, Writer, Producer
- Years active: 2013 -

Angad Aulakh is an American filmmaker. His feature directorial debut Autumn Lights, released in theaters in North America on October 21, 2016. He produced the film for his company Last Carnival with Guy Kent.

== Life and career ==
Aulakh produced Autumn Lights for his company Last Carnival with Guy Kent, alongside Ashley M. Kent, Davíd Óskar Ólafsson and Árni Filippusson, producers of Ragnar Bragason's Metalhead and David Gordon Green's Prince Avalanche.

Aulakh was nominated for Best Director at the 2017 Riviera International Film Festival for Autumn Lights alongside Xavier Dolan for It's Only the End of the World, winner Amanda Kernell for Baden Baden and Academy Award-nominated filmmaker Ciro Guerra for Embrace of the Serpent. The film was also nominated for the Grand Jury Prize for Best Picture, Aulakh sharing the nomination with producers Guy Kent, Ashley M. Kent, David Oskar Olafsson, and Arni Filippusson.

Autumn Lights was nominated by Norway's Cinema Scandinavia for Best Picture in Fall 2016.

== Filmography ==
=== Film ===
Year	Film	Role	Notes
2013	Charlie	Director, writer, producer	Short film
2013	Wooden Hills	Director, writer, producer	Short film
2015	Hi-Tone	Director, writer, producer	Short film
2016	Autumn Lights	Director, writer, producer	Nominated, Grand Jury Prize Best Picture Riviera International Film Festival; Nominated, Jury Prize Best Director Riviera International Film Festival; Nominated, Best Film, Cinema Scandinavia Awards (Norway); New York Film Critics Series Pick

== Awards ==
- 2022 Cult Critic Movie Awards
