= Dracula 3D =

- Theatrical release poster
- Directed by: Dario Argento
- Screenplay by: Dario Argento; Enrique Cerezo; Stefano Piani; Antonio Tentori
- Based on: Dracula by Bram Stoker
- Produced by: Enrique Cerezo; Roberto Di Girolamo; Sergio Gobbi; Franco Paolucci; Stefano Piani
- Starring: Thomas Kretschmann; Marta Gastini; Asia Argento; Unax Ugalde; Miriam Giovanelli; Rutger Hauer
- Cinematography: Luciano Tovoli
- Edited by: Marshall Harvey
- Music by: Claudio Simonetti
- Production companies: Enrique Cerezo Producciones Cinematográficas S. A. Les Films de l'Astre
- Distributed by: Bolero Film (Italy); Panocéanic Films (France); Filmax (Spain)
- Release dates: 19 May 2012 (Cannes); 27 November 2013 (France)
- Running time: 110 minutes
- Countries: Italy; France; Spain
- Language: English
- Budget: €5.6 million (US$7.7 million)

Dracula 3D (also known as Argento's Dracula) is a 2012 vampire horror film directed by Dario Argento from a screenplay he wrote with Enrique Cerezo, Stefano Piani, and Antonio Tentori. It stars Thomas Kretschmann as Count Dracula, alongside Marta Gastini, Asia Argento, Unax Ugalde, Miriam Giovanelli, and Rutger Hauer.

== Plot ==
During the Walpurgis Night in the woods adjacent to the village of Passo Borgo, located at the foot of the Carpathian Mountains, a couple of young lovers, Tanja and Milos, secretly meet and have sex. After fighting, Tanja removes the cross Milos had given her. On her way home, Tanja is chased by a supernatural creature that drains her blood. Sometime later, Jonathan Harker, a young librarian hired by Count Dracula, a nobleman from the area, arrives at the village. Tanja's body mysteriously disappears from the cemetery when the taxidermist Renfield intervenes in an attempt to stake her, killing Milos in the process. In the meantime, Harker, before going to Count Dracula's castle, takes the opportunity to visit Lucy Kisslinger, his wife Mina's best friend as well as the daughter of the local mayor.

Upon arriving at the castle, Harker is greeted by Tanja, reanimated as a vampire, who tries from the very beginning to seduce him; however, they are interrupted by Dracula's entrance welcoming Harker. Dracula shows Harker the library he is to catalogue. The following night Tanja, having burnt Harker's photo of his wife, Mina, tries again to seduce and bite Harker, undressing in front of him, but a furious Dracula intervenes, throwing her across the room. Dracula bites Harker's neck but allows him to live. Dracula meanwhile visits Renfield in his cell and frees him from his chains; Renfield acknowledges Dracula as "Master". That night, Harker glimpses Dracula climbing unnaturally up the outside wall of the castle. The following day, a weakened but still conscious Harker attempts to escape, but as soon as he is outside the castle, a large wolf with a white lock transforms into Dracula, who savages him.

Meanwhile, Mina arrives in the village and is a guest for a few days at the home of her dearest friend Lucy Kisslinger, who also gets bitten and turned. The day after, Mina, worried about her husband, goes to Count Dracula's castle. Their encounter makes her forget what happened during her visit. She is completely under the count's influence; the count had orchestrated the events leading up to their encounter; in fact, Mina looks exactly like his beloved wife, Dolingen de Gratz, who died from a sudden illness some centuries ago, and it’s also implied that he stalked her since the moment of her birth.

Returning to the Kisslinger house, Mina learns of the death of Lucy. The sequence of such strange and dramatic events summons the aid of Abraham Van Helsing, an expert on vampires and the techniques used to eliminate them. Being aware of the circumstances, Van Helsing decides to act swiftly and prepares the tools needed to combat vampires. He inspects Lucy's crypt and finds it empty, then kills the undead Lucy as she tries to attack Mina. He then directs himself to the center of evil, Count Dracula's castle.

Meanwhile, Dracula goes to the village and kills a group of men gathered at the tavern who plotted to betray him, all except for his loyal spy, Zoran. At the same time, Van Helsing, inside the castle, is able to definitively kill Tanja, Zoran, Renfield, and a now-undead Harker. Dracula, intent on his desire to reunite with his wife, leads Mina, completely hypnotized, to the castle where Van Helsing is waiting. He has decided to engage in a deadly fight with his evil foe. During the struggle, Van Helsing loses his gun loaded with a silver bullet coated in garlic, but Mina, shaking off Dracula's spell, picks up the gun and kills Dracula with it. The special silver bullet transforms Dracula into ashes, and Mina walks out of the graveyard, and Van Helsing coming along with her. After they leave, however, Dracula's spirit lifts the ashes into the air and, uniting, they shape into a large wolf that leaps forward.

== Cast ==
- Thomas Kretschmann as Dracula
- Marta Gastini as Mina Harker
- Asia Argento as Lucy Kisslinger
- Unax Ugalde as Jonathan Harker
- Miriam Giovanelli as Tanja
- Rutger Hauer as Van Helsing
- Maria Cristina Heller as Jarmila
- Augusto Zucchi as Andrej Kisslinger
- Franco Ravera as Prete
- Francesco Rossini as Ten. Delbruck
- Giovanni Franzoni as Renfield
- Giuseppe Loconsole as Zoran
- Riccardo Cicogna as Janek
- Christian Burruano as Milos

== Production ==
Prior to the production of the film, Argento had wanted to film a version of Dracula but he "could not find the way into it". With advances in 3D technology, Argento revisited the idea as he felt he could offer a fresh take on the story in 3D.

The project was first announced on 20 May 2010 at the Cannes Film Festival, along with a teaser poster. with the first set images were released on 10 July 2011.

Montalto Dora Castle served as a filming location.

== Release ==
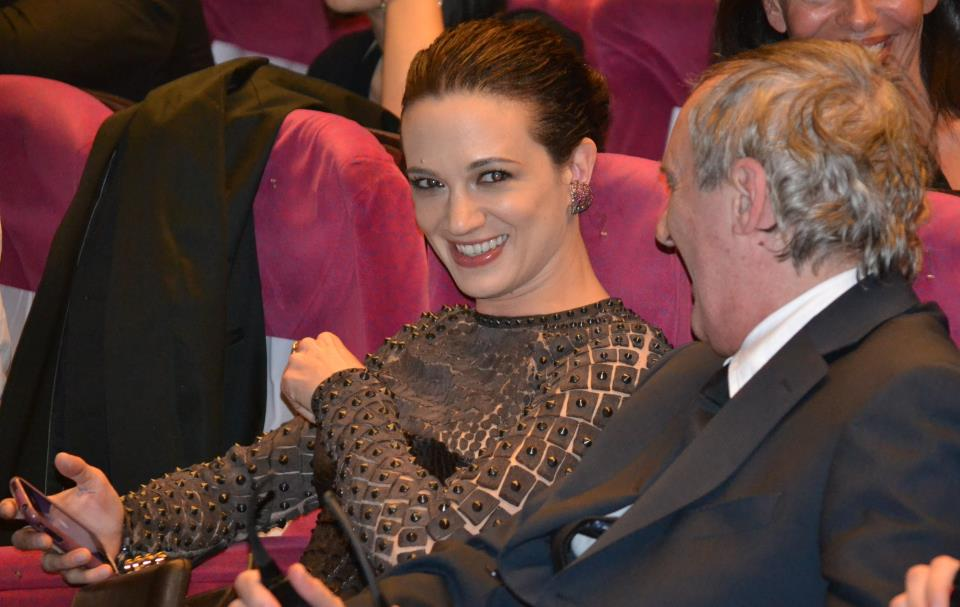
Asia and Dario Argento at the film's screening at the 2012 Cannes Film Festival.

Dracula 3D premiered at the Cannes Film Festival on 19 May 2012. It was released theatrically in France on 27 November 2013.

== Reception ==
Dracula received generally negative reviews, currently holding a 20% rating on Rotten Tomatoes. The site’s critics consensus states: "Schlocky and gross but far from bad enough to be good, Argento's Dracula 3D bites and sucks in all the wrong ways." On Metacritic, the film has a 23/100 rating, indicating "generally unfavorable reviews".

The Hollywood Reporter gave the film a negative review, noting that the "first of many unintentional laughs in Dario Argento's Dracula 3D comes on the opening credits" and "this is a tired rehash that adds little to the canon aside from such outré touches as having Drac shapeshift into a swarm of flies or a giant grasshopper in one howler of a scene". Variety also gave the film a negative review, stating, "director Argento half-heartedly mixes schlocky 3D f/x with one-dimensional characters for a near-two-hour joke that ought to have been funnier". The A.V. Club gave the film a D rating and criticized the film's "inept pacing, clunky cinematographic staging, shoddy sets".

Screen Daily noted that "it is so lushly loopy that against all odds it could become something of a 3D cult title, and certainly for those of us who have 'experienced' it there is a certain 'I was there' badge of honour to go alongside having been at the Cannes screenings of The Brave or Southland Tales".

Peter Sobczynski of RogerEbert.com also gave an unfavorable review, criticizing Argento for delivering "a version [of Dracula] that plays like a choppy condensation based on hazy memories of the book", and described Thomas Kretschmann's performance as "perhaps the least terrifying version of Dracula to come along since Leslie Nielsen".

The film was also criticized for its look and visual effects, with TV Guide opining that "despite some attractive costumes and sets, Argento's Dracula is a sparse, cheap-looking movie, with visual effects that would have been rejected on Buffy the Vampire Slayer". Likewise, Fangoria faulted the film for containing "some of the worst visual FX for a film of this stature in recent memory".

== See also ==
- Vampire film
