= Under the Tree (2017 film) =

2017 Icelandic comedy drama film

- Film poster
- Directed by: Hafsteinn Gunnar Sigurðsson
- Written by: Hafsteinn Gunnar Sigurðsson
- Starring: Steinþór Hróar Steinþórsson
- Cinematography: Monika Lenczewska
- Music by: Daníel Bjarnason
- Release dates: 31 August 2017 (Venice); 6 September 2017 (Iceland)
- Running time: 89 minutes
- Country: Iceland
- Language: Icelandic
- Box office: $612,628

Under the Tree (Icelandic: Undir trénu) is a 2017 Icelandic dark comedy drama film directed by Hafsteinn Gunnar Sigurðsson. It was screened in the Contemporary World Cinema section at the 2017 Toronto International Film Festival. The film was selected as the Icelandic entry for the Best Foreign Language Film at the 90th Academy Awards, but did not get nominated.

== Synopsis ==
Konrad and Eybjorg complain to their neighbours Inga and Baldvin that their tree casts a shadow over their backyard patio. This ignites a feud that escalates exponentially, leading to a tragic yet comedic ending.

== Cast ==
- Steinþór Hróar Steinþórsson as Atli
- Edda Björgvinsdóttir as Inga
- Sigurður Sigurjónsson as Baldvin
- Þorsteinn Bachmann as Konrad
- Lára Jóhanna Jónsdóttir as Agnes
- Selma Björnsdóttir as Eybjorg

== Reception ==
On review aggregator Rotten Tomatoes, the film holds an approval rating of 84% based on 25 reviews, with an average rating of 7.2/10. On Metacritic, the film has a weighted average score of 75 out of 100 based on 12 reviews, indicating "generally favorable reviews".

== See also ==
- List of submissions to the 90th Academy Awards for Best Foreign Language Film
- List of Icelandic submissions for the Academy Award for Best Foreign Language Film
