= Compulsion (2016 film) =

2016 UK-Canada-Italy film

- Directed by: Craig Goodwill
- Written by: Brian Clark
- Produced by: Mike Macari; Craig Goodwill; Neil Dunn; Peta-Megan Dunn; Moira Romano - Executive Producer
- Starring: Lio Tipton; Jakob Cedergren; Marta Gastini
- Cinematography: David Ungaro
- Edited by: Michael Doherty; Micah Stuart; Glenn Berman
- Music by: Silvio Amato
- Production companies: Atlantic Screen Productions; ETV Film
- Release date: 19 November 2016 (Torino Film Festival)
- Running time: 84 minutes
- Countries: United Kingdom; Canada; Italy
- Language: English

Compulsion, also known as Sadie, is a 2016 internationally co-produced erotic thriller film directed by Craig Goodwill. It stars Lio Tipton, Jakob Cedergren and Marta Gastini. It premiered at the Torino Film Festival in November 2016.

== Plot ==
Sadie Glass is on a book tour with her boyfriend, Thierry. She is promoting her book that details her chaotic relationship with Alex, which is implied to have been sexual and violent. At an event in Italy, Alex shows up and invites Sadie to spend the weekend with him instead of meeting Thierry's family in Paris.

Disenchanted with her current relationship, she agrees to meet Alex at a club. There, they meet Francesca, who performs an erotic dance. Sadie agrees to join Alex only if Francesca joins them.

At the villa, Sadie and Francesca drink and take drugs and begin a sexual relationship while Alex prepares for a party. At the party, many guests arrive, take drugs, and have sex with one another. Sadie walks into a room where a woman's throat is slit and she is lifted into the air by her arms.

Sadie awakens with a start, questioning whether what she saw was real. She confronts Alex, who blames her for not knowing what she was getting herself into.

Sadie leaves the villa and tries to leave town. She asks a man in a car to drive her away, but the man attacks and drugs her, returning her to the villa. When she wakes up, Alex cleans her up and tells her it was just a game.

That night, before another party, Thierry shows up and tells Sadie that he loves her. Sadie rebuffs him and searches for Alex. She tells Alex that Thierry doesn't belong here, and that if he lets Thierry go, she will do what he wants.

Francesca gives Sadie more drugs, but while she isn't looking, Sadie spits them out. Alex escorts Sadie to a room full of people surrounding Thierry, who is tied up in the same way the woman was the previous night. Francesca, dressed as an executioner, gives Sadie a knife. Sadie approaches Thierry and cuts her own arm behind his back while the rest of the crowd begins to kiss and fondle each other. As Sadie moves to cut Thierry's bonds, Alex attempts to stop her but she stabs him in the stomach. Furious, Francesca slits Thierry's throat and runs away.

Some time later, in New York City, Sadie is at a restaurant, promoting a new book. It reveals she actually killed Alex in Paris, before the movie even began. She sees Francesca in the crowd and they speak afterwards, Francesca implying that Sadie will soon return to the violent and sex-filled world she's trying to run away from. Outside, as Sadie is being photographed, she sees Francesca enter a car and sit next to Alex.

== Cast ==
- Lio Tipton as Sadie Glass
- Marta Gastini as Francesca
- Jakob Cedergren as Alex
- Jan Bijvoet as Minos
- Anita Kravos as Thelma
- Valentin Merlet as Thierry

== Production ==
In September 2015, Tipton was announced to star in the film. The filming took place in Italy, beginning in November 2015.
