= Orsino Orsini =

Italian nobleman, husband of Giulia Farnese (1473-1500)

Orsino Orsini-Migliorati (1473 – 31 July 1500), Lord of Bassanello, was the husband of Giulia "La Bella" Farnese (1474–1524), the mistress of Pope Alexander VI.

== Family ==
Born in Bassanello, the only son of Ludovico Orsini-Migliorati (1425-1489) and wife Adriana de Milà (b. 1434), Orsino was related to Alexander VI through his mother, who was the Pope's third cousin. Adriana had been widowed at an early age and had sought the "protection" of her cousin, then-Cardinal Rodrigo Borgia, in order to effectively administer her late husband's vast estates and to safeguard her son's considerable inheritance. In return for this "protection", Adriana served as Rodrigo's friend and close confidante and was even put in charge of the wardship of his illegitimate daughter Lucrezia Borgia.

== Marriage and adult life ==
At age 16, Orsino married 15-year-old Giulia Farnese, the daughter of Luigi Farnese by his wife, Giovanna Caetani. Giulia was also the sister of the future Pope Paul III (born Alessandro Farnese). While Orsino has been rather disparagingly described as being "squint eyed", "awkward" and "self-conscious," Giulia was a beautiful young woman who went by the nickname of La Bella, "the beautiful one." Shortly after this marriage, around 1491, Giulia met Rodrigo Borgia, during one of his visits to Montegiordano to see his daughter, Lucrezia. When the Cardinal expressed a desire to take her daughter-in-law for a mistress, Adriana immediately gave her permission and blessings to the affair. In exchange for his enforced compliance to his wife's adultery with Rodrigo, Orsino was granted mayorship of the city of Carbognano. Rodrigo Borgia took the papal throne in August 1492 as Alexander VI, the same year in which Giulia gave birth to a daughter, Laura, whose paternity is still disputed today, although Giulia claimed she was Borgia's own daughter. Briefly concerned that a scandal would break out, Alexander VI did not acknowledge paternity, which was instead attributed to, and accepted by, Orsino.

Orsino died in Rome on 31 July 1500, at age 27, of unknown causes. At around the time of his death, Giulia and the Pope had become mildly estranged but Orsino's mother Adriana eventually brokered a peaceful separation of the two. Adriana herself continued to remain in high standing with the Pope as his friend and confidante, even chaperoning Lucrezia on her journey to wed Alfonso d'Este. Adriana died in about 1509, and the control of Carbognano passed to her erstwhile daughter-in-law, Giulia. The vast Orsini family fortune was eventually inherited by Laura Orsini and then by her children, Giulio and Lavinia della Rovere.

== Ancestry ==
Ancestors of Orsino Orsini

8. Antonio de' Migliorati (brother of Pope Innocent VII)
4. Gentile de' Migliorati, Signore di Bassanello
9. Antonella N
2. Ludovico Orsini Migliorati, Signore di Bassanello
10. Carlo Orsini, Signore di Bracciano
5. Elena Orsini
11. Paola Orsini
1. Orsino Orsini Migliorati
12. Juan de Mila y Centelles, 4th Baron of Massalavés and 1st Lord of Albaida
6. Pedro de Mila y Borja, 5th Baron of Massalavés and Lord of Tropea
13. Catalina de Borja
3. Adriana de Mila
14. Garietta Del Doce
7. Covella Del Doce
15. Elena Marramaldo
