= Sanctuary of the Madonna del Ruscello, Vallerano =

Catholic church in Viterbo province, Italy

Coordinates: 42°22′51.1″N 12°15′52.7″E

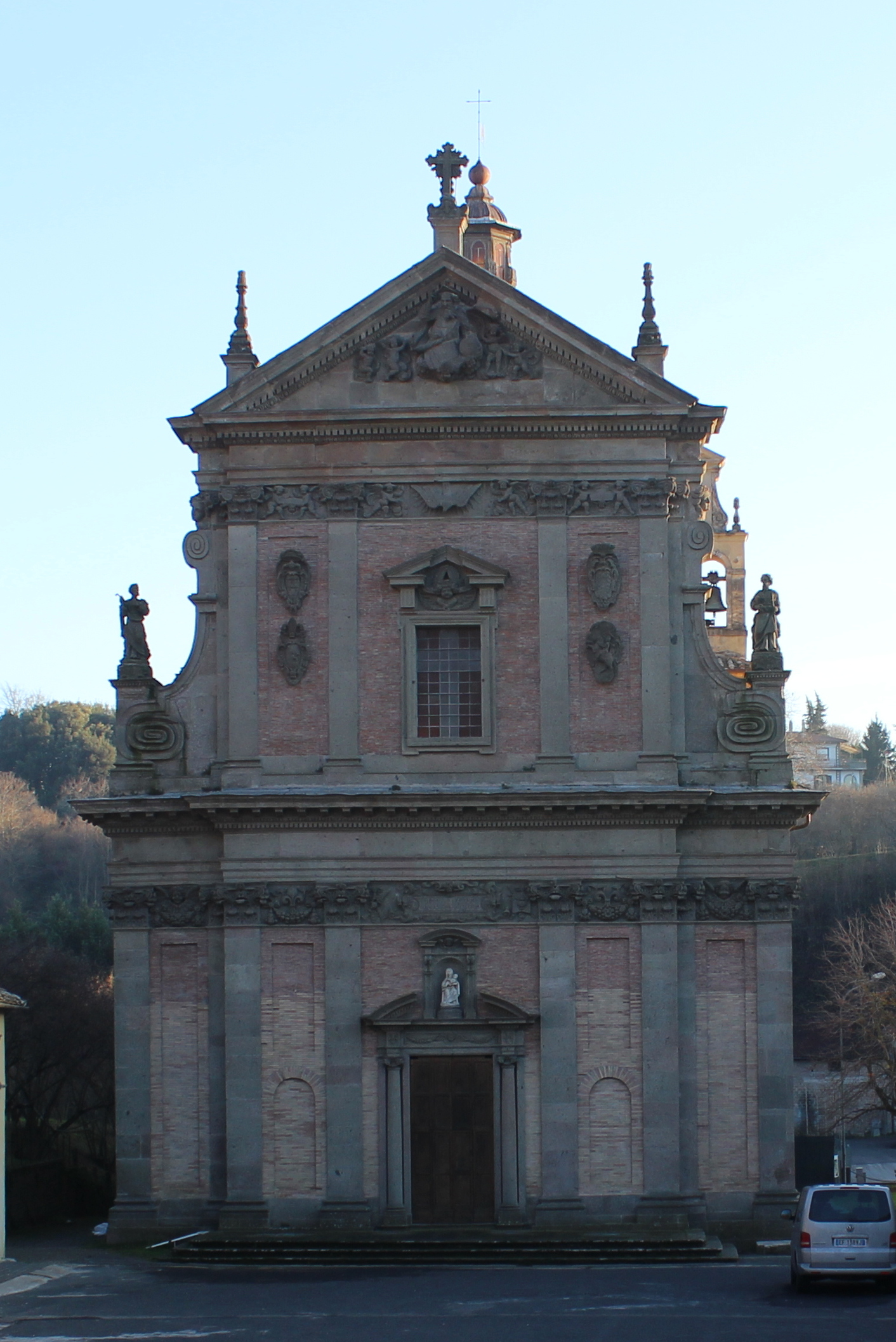

The Sanctuary of the Madonna del Ruscello, also known as Santa Maria del Ruscello or the Santuario di Maria Santissima del Ruscello dei Donatori di Sangue, is a Baroque-style, Roman Catholic church located on Piazza A. Xerry De Caro #13 in the town of Vallerano, province of Viterbo, region of Lazio, Italy.

== History ==
In 1604, the local parish priest Don Vittore Petrucci had contracted a local painter, named Stefano Minicucci, to restore a poorly-conserved medieval fresco depicting the Virgin and Child, housed in a small road-side chapel, standing beside a small stream or rivulet (ruscello). while repainting the mouth of the Virgin, on 5 July 1604, putatively blood emerged from her lips. Alerted, the local archpriest Don Pietro Janni sent word to the bishop, Monsignor Andrea Longo, located in Civita Castellana. The word of the miracle spread, and by March of 1605, funds had been raised to begin construction of this church. The design of the church is said to have been formulated by local architects based on designs by Jacopo Barozzi da Vignola (who had died in 1573). Funds for the construction were also afforded by Cardinal Odoardo Farnese, whose family had become Dukes of Parma and Piacenza, and in 1536 obtained these lands for the Duchy.

The late mannerist or baroque facade stands at the end of a piazza flanked by a series of shops, with broad arched doors. In the past, these housed businesses selling and servicing pilgrims, as the church was conveniently located on a pilgrimage route to Rome. The facade is made from grey peperino stone and brick. The portal has ionic columns holding a tympanum with a 15th century marble sculpture of the Virgin and Child. The portal is flanked by Corinthian pilasters supporting a stone frieze decorated with garlands and cherubs. The lilies among the garlands were symbols of the Farnese family. The theme is repeated in the second story, with a central image of a descending dove (symbol of the holy spirit), and in the tympanum, God the Father. The second story has four coats of arms representing various donors. The roof-line of the facade is flanked by statues of Saints Peter and Paul standing atop volute scrolls.

The inner oak door has a number of sculpted wood panels. The layout is that of a Latin Cross with four side chapels. The crossing has a frescoed cupola. The chapels were independently sponsored by the Paesani (first on right), Janni, Marcucci, and Farnese families. The first chapel on the right (Paesani) has an altarpiece depicting Virgin and Child with Saints by the circle of Giovanni Lanfranco. The chapel has fresco and stucco decorations. The second chapel on the right (Janni) is also decorated in a baroque fashion, with a main altarpiece of a painted 17th century crucifix. The first chapel on the left (Marcucci) has a polychrome marble altar with a canvas of The Annunciation by Girolamo Troppa. The Farnese chapel, second on the left, was dedicated to Santa Barbara. The main altarpiece, depicting the Glory of the Virgin with Saints John the Evangelist and Barbara in Ecstasy, is attributed to Giovanni Lanfranco.

The crossing has a dome erected in 1620 by the architect Giovanni Maria Benazzini; the cupola was frescoed by Giuseppe Bastiani, and depicts the four evangelists.

In 1993, the Madonna of Ruscello was recognized as patron of the blood donors.
