= Hafsteinn Gunnar Sigurðsson =

Icelandic film director and screenwriter

- Born: 24 September 1978 (age 46)
- Occupations: film director; screenwriter
- Awards: Edda Award for Best Director

Hafsteinn Gunnar Sigurðsson (born 24 September 1978) is an Icelandic film director and screenwriter.

== Filmography ==
- Skröltormar (2007) (Short)
- Paradox (2011) (Documentary)
- Either Way (Á annan veg) (2011)
- Filma (2012) (Documentary)
- París norðursins (2014)
- Under the Tree (Undir trénu) (2017)
- Last Call (Síðasta áminningin) (2018) (Documentary)
- Northern Comfort (2023)
