= Hugi Gudmundsson =

Icelandic composer (born 1977)

Hugi Guðmundsson (10 June 1977) is an Icelandic composer of contemporary classical music. His work is performed internationally at concerts and music festivals. He lives and works as a composer in Copenhagen, Denmark.

== Early life and education ==
Guðmundsson studied composition in Iceland with Dr. Ulfar Ingi Haraldsson and Þorkell Sigurbjörnsson (1997-2001). He finished a master's degree in composition from the Royal Danish Academy of Music in 2005 and finished a second master's degree in electronic music from the Institute of Sonology (The Hague, The Netherlands) in 2007.

== Career ==
In 2004, Guðmundsson composed "Adoro te devote" for choir and saxophone quartet, 2004. The work was commissioned by Hallgrimskirkja Motet Choir for a concert with the Rascher Saxophone Quartet. It was nominated for the Icelandic Music Awards in 2005. The piece has been on the program of a number of choirs and saxophone quartets, including Cantori New York and Prism Saxophone Quartet.

In 2005 his "Eq. IV: Windbells", for amplified instruments and electronics, was commissioned by Caput Ensemble for the 2005 World Expo in Japan. It won honorary mentions in two categories at the International Rostrum of Composers, in Paris in 2006. The piece was nominated for the Icelandic Music Awards in 2006.

IN 2007, Guðmundsson composed "Apocrypha", designed for an ensemble of amplified period instruments, mezzo-soprano, percussion and electronics. The piece received the Icelandic Music Awards in 2007 as composition of the year. A recording of the piece was nominated for the Icelandic Music Awards in 2008 as CD of the year. Kraumur Awards, 2008. It was included on an album recorded by Nordic Affect, with Gudrun Johanna Olafsdottir (mezzo-soprano) and Daniel Bjarnason (conductor).

Guðmundsson's composition "Handelusive", performed by a quintet of period instruments in 2009, was commissioned by Nordic Affect for an EBU broadcast dedicated to G. F. Handel. It received honorary mention at the International Rostrum of Composers in Lisbon in 2010.

In 2013 Guðmundsson released an album of choral works, Calm of the Deep.

In 2014 he was nominated for a Nordic Council award for his sound track to "Solar5: Journey to the Center of Sound".

In 2014 he was presented with an 855,000 kronor grant from the Danish Arts Foundation.

In 2016, the American-Icelandic film Autumn Lights was released in the theaters, which Guðmundsson scored. The soundtrack was released on October 18, 2016. The score was shortlisted by AMPAS for the Academy Awards in 2017.
