= Njáll =

Njáll (Old Norse pronunciation: [ˈnjɑːlː]; Icelandic pronunciation: [ˈnjautl̥]) is an old Viking given name native to Iceland and other Scandinavian countries. It was borrowed or derived from the Old Irish name Niall.

== People with this name ==
- Njáll Þorgeirsson, character in Njáls saga
- Njáll Trausti Friðbertsson (born 1969), Icelandic politician
