= Fabrizio Colica =

Italian actor and comedian (born 1991)

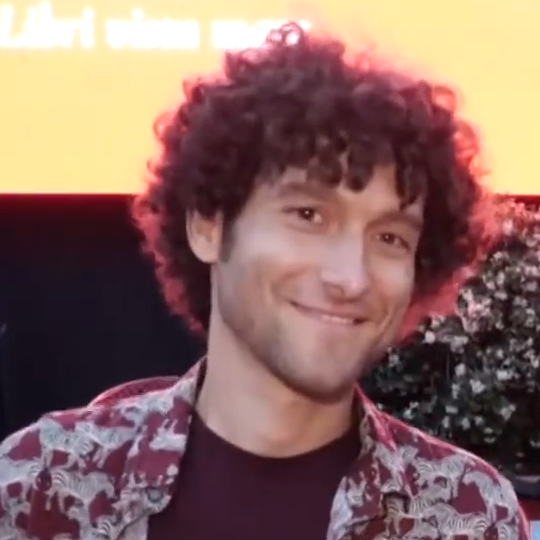
- Colica in 2021
- Born: 6 July 1991 (age 35); Rome, Italy
- Occupations: Actor, comedian
- Years active: 2013–present

Fabrizio Colica (born 6 July 1991) is an Italian actor and comedian.

== Career ==
Fabrizio Colica began his career together with his brother Claudio, creating the comedy duo Le Coliche ("The colics") and publishing short videos on social media about various everyday topics, pop culture and life in Rome. Their skits went viral and started to gain recognition beyond Rome. In 2013, he was part of the cast of the TV series Roles.

In 2015, he landed his first leading role in the drama Our Last. Subsequently, he had supporting roles in the films Rainbow: A Private Affair by the Taviani brothers in 2017, and Good Gals by Michela Andreozzi in 2019.

In 2018, he took part with his brother Claudio at the Rai 2 reality game show Pechino Express; after his brother's injury, he continued the competition in pairs with Tommy Kuti, ultimately finishing in second place. In 2021, the duo published their first autobiographical book, Come il mal di pancia, with illustrations by comic artist Giacomo Bevilacqua.

In 2024, Colica starred in the Amazon original film Still Fabulous and in Michela Giraud's directorial debut Flaminia.

== Personal life ==
In 2019, on his birthday, Colica came out as gay and announced that he was in a relationship with Giacomo Visconti. They married on 10 July 2021.

== Filmography ==
Film
Year	Title	Role	Notes
2015	Our Last	Fabrizio	Lead role
2017	Rainbow: A Private Affair	Leone	
2018	La profezia dell'armadillo	Vampire guy	
2019	Good Gals	Paco	
2024	Still Fabulous	Stefano	
2024	Flaminia	Dr. Marini	
2025	Twin Stars	Don Pietro	
2026	Still Sexy	Stefano	

Television
Year	Title	Role	Notes
2013	Roles	Gabriele	Web series
2018	Maxi: Il grande processo alla Mafia	Gianni	TV miniseries; main role
2022	So Wine So Food	Quinto	TV miniseries; 5 episodes

== Works ==
- Claudio Colica; Fabrizio Colica (2021). Come il mal di pancia. La storia vera di due fratelli per sbaglio. Milan: Mondadori Electa.
