= Hafliði Hallgrímsson =

Icelandic composer (born 1941)

Hafliði Hallgrímsson (born 1941) is an Icelandic composer. He was born in Akureyri, and lived for a time in Bath, England. Hafliði was the principal cellist of the Scottish Chamber Orchestra, but left that position in 1983 to pursue a full-time career as a composer. In 2008, he became composer-in-residence of the Iceland Symphony Orchestra (through 2010).

He studied violoncello in Italy with Enrico Mainardi and composition in England with Peter Maxwell Davies and Alan Bush.

In 1970, Hafliði played the (uncredited) cello solo on “Atom Heart Mother” by Pink Floyd. His concerto for violin and string orchestra, Poemi, won the 1986 Nordic Council Music Prize.

== Selected compositions ==
- Verse I for flute and cello (1975)
- Poemi for violin and string orchestra (1983)
- Eight Pieces for wind quintet (1991)
- Intarsia for wind quintet (1992 revision of Eight Pieces for wind quintet)
- Rima for soprano and string orchestra (1994)
- Herma for cello and string orchestra (1995)
- Crucifixion for orchestra (1997)
- Mini-stories, music theatre work (1997)
- Homage to Mondrian seven pieces for piano solo, written for the Indonesian pianist Ananda Sukarlan (1995-2006)
- Passía for mezzo-soprano, tenor, choir and chamber orchestra (2001)
- Die Wält der Zwischenfälle, chamber opera (2003)
- Cello Concerto (2003)
- Dagbókarbrot (Notes from a Diary) for viola and piano, Op. 33 (2005); dedicated to the memory of Anne Frank
- Narratives from the Deep North for symphony orchestra, Op. 41 (2009)

== Selected recordings ==
- Herma; Ombra; Rima - Smekkleysa SMK 38
- Daydreams in Numbers; Jacob’s Ladder; Strönd; Tristia; Verse I - Merlin MRFD 88101
- Four Movements for String Quartet; Offerto; Solitaire; String Quartet No 1 - Eye of the Storm EOS 5004
- Passía. Ondine ODE 1027-2 (2003)
- Cello concerto; Herma. Ondine 1133-2 (2009)
- Choral Works. Schola Cantorum Reykjavík, dir. Hörður Áskelsson (2013)
