= Marta Gastini =

Italian actress

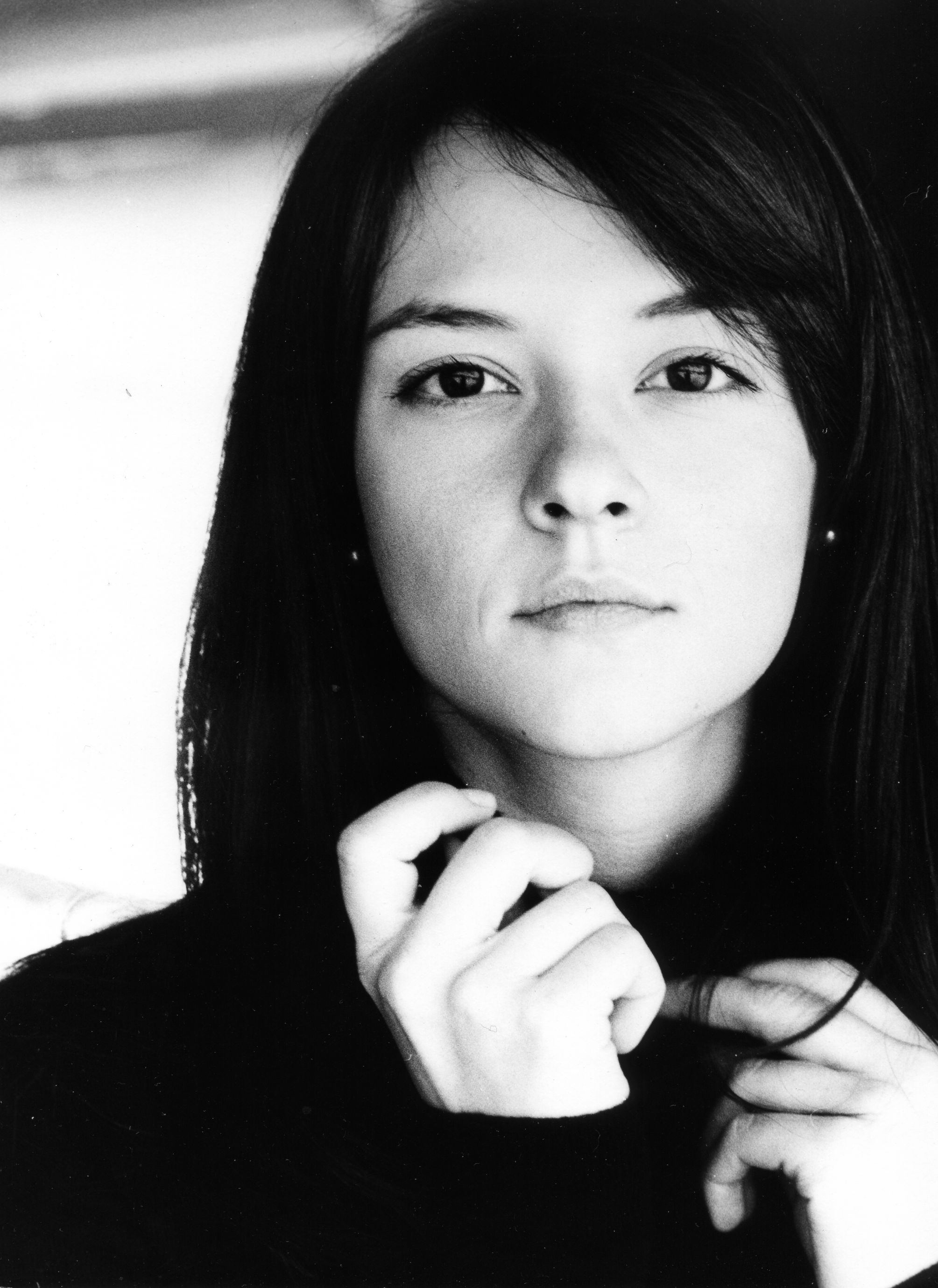
- Marta Gastini
- Born: Marta Gastini; 2 October 1989 (age 36); Alessandria, Italy
- Occupation: Actress
- Years active: 2009–present

Marta Gastini (born 2 October 1989) is an Italian actress, best known for playing Giulia Farnese in Borgia and for starring in the film The Rite.

== Life and career ==
After receiving an elementary education, she debuted as an actress on Italian television in January 2009 with the television miniseries Il Bene e il Male ("Good and Evil"), followed by a starring role in the prime-time miniseries L'uomo che cavalcava nel buio ("The Man Who Rode in the Dark").

On 18 December 2009, she made her début in cinema with the film Me and Marilyn directed by Leonardo Pieraccioni, where she played the role of Martha, daughter of Gualtiero Marchesi, who was played by the director.

In 2010, aged 20, Gastini appeared with Anthony Hopkins and Colin O'Donoghue in the American film The Rite, directed by Mikael Håfström and produced by New Line Cinema and Gastini's father in Los Angeles.

In 2011, Gastini appeared as Giulia Farnese in the TV series Borgia.

In 2016, Gastini starred in the American-Icelandic film Autumn Lights as Marie. The film was released on 21 October 2016 in the United States and Canada from Freestyle Releasing.

=== Other activities ===
In 2008, Gastini became a spokeswoman for the Christian Blind Mission.

== Filmography ==
=== Films ===
Year	Title	Role	Notes
2009	Me and Marilyn	Martina Marchesi	
2011	The Rite	Rosaria	
2012	Dracula 3D	Mina Murray	
2012	Evil Things - Cose cattive	Nina/Ariel	
2012	La moglie del sarto	Sofia	
2016	Questi giorni	Caterina	
2016	Compulsion	Francesca	
2016	Autumn Lights	Marie	
2017	Moglie e marito	Maria	
2019	Bentornato Presidente	Teodoro's secretary	Cameo appearance
2019	L'eroe	Marta	
2020	Io sono Vera	Vera	
2021	Four to Dinner	Giulia	

=== Television ===
Year	Title	Role	Notes
2009	Il bene e il male	Sara Anastasi	Main role
2009	L'uomo che cavalcava nel buio	Adult Serena	Miniseries
2011–2014	Borgia	Giulia Farnese	Main role
2016	Catturandi - Nel nome del padre	Alina Vergani	Main role
2016	Lampedusa - Dall'orizzone in poi	Giulia	Miniseries
2020	Passeggeri notturni	Sabrina Leonardi	Main role
2021	Tutta colpa di Freud	Marta Taramelli	Main role

== Awards ==
- Gold Gagliaudo (2010) – Civic merit medal awarded to Alessandrian citizens who have distinguished themselves for professional merit.
- Young Certainty of the Italian Cinema (2011) – FilmVideo Montecatini (Won)
- L'Oréal Paris Cinema Award (2011) – Venice Film Festival (Nomination)
- Silver Ribbon (2011) – Best Supporting Actress for The Rite (Nomination)
- Jury Prize, Best Actress (2017) - Autumn Lights - Riviera International Film Festival (Nomination)
