= British Short Film Awards =

British Film Awards

- Awarded for: Achievement in short filmmaking
- Country: United Kingdom
- Presented by: CenterFrame
- First award: 2021
- Website: bsfa.uk/Year5

The British Short Film Awards (BSFA) are film awards recognising achievements in British and international short films. Founded in 2020, the awards held their first ceremony in December 2021. The awards were acquired by the filmmaking platform CenterFrame in 2025.

== History ==
=== Foundation and inaugural awards ===
The British Short Film Awards were founded in 2020 by Tommy Clarke. The inaugural ceremony took place online in December 2021 and was hosted by Alex Zane.

At the first awards, David Bradley won Best Actor for his performance in Roy. Peter Capaldi received the Icon Award, while Elliot Grove, founder of the Raindance Film Festival, received the Impact Award. Starboy, directed by Joëlle Bentolila, won Best Short Film, and Enjoy, directed by Saul Abraham, won Best British Short Film.

=== Subsequent editions ===
In 2022, the organisers launched a Short Film Fund to support British short filmmakers. The second ceremony was held in person, with Zane returning as host.

An Irish Goodbye, directed by Tom Berkeley and Ross White, won Best Short Film at the 2022 awards. The film subsequently won an Oscar and a BAFTA in 2023. It was screened at the following British Short Film Awards ceremony, where Berkeley and White discussed its subsequent awards success with Zane.

The third ceremony took place at the Marylebone Theatre in London on 7 November 2023, again hosted by Zane. Awards were presented across 26 categories. Muna won Best Short Film, In Too Deep won Best British Short Film, and Kosar Ali received Best Actress for Muna.

Jellyfish and Lobster received the Jury Award at the 2023 edition, while its director, Yasmin Afifi, won Best British Director and Max Reynolds won Best Editing. Other winners included Requiem, which received Best Student Short Film, and Middle Watch, which won Best Animated Short Film. Jellyfish and Lobster subsequently won the BAFTA for British Short Film in February 2024.

At the 2024 awards, Delivery, written and directed by Ben Lankester, won Best Short Film, while its lead performer, Rosie Chappel, won Best Actress.

=== Acquisition by CenterFrame ===
In June 2025, CenterFrame announced its acquisition of the British Short Film Awards. The announcement identified CenterFrame as the platform through which subsequent submissions would be administered and outlined plans for industry events connecting nominees with producers, executives, and agents.

== Award categories ==
The categories have varied between editions. For the fifth edition, the awards include categories for films, unproduced screenplays, performances, and filmmaking crafts. Separate awards recognise short films from England, Northern Ireland, Scotland, and Wales, with Best British Short Film selected from the four national winners.

=== Film and screenplay awards ===
The fifth edition's film and unproduced screenplay categories are:

- Best British Short Film
- Best Animated Short
- Best Documentary Short
- Best English Short
- Best International Short
- Best Live Action Short
- Best Northern Irish Short
- Best Scottish Short
- Best Student Short
- Best Welsh Short
- Best Unproduced Screenplay

=== Performance and craft awards ===
The fifth edition includes fourteen performance and craft categories:

- Best Actor
- Best Actress
- Best Casting
- Best Cinematography
- Best Costume Design
- Best Directing
- Best Editing
- Best Hair and Makeup
- Best Production Design
- Best Score
- Best Screenplay
- Best Sound Design
- Best Supporting Actor
- Best Supporting Actress

=== Honorary and special awards ===
The inaugural edition included the Icon Award, awarded to Peter Capaldi, and the Impact Award, awarded to Elliot Grove. Other special awards presented that year included the Jury Award, Auteurs Award, Founders Award, and Audience Award.

== 2026 ceremony ==
The fifth edition is scheduled to take place on 8 November 2026 at BFI Southbank in London, hosted by Claudia Winkleman. The ceremony is scheduled for the venue's NFT1 auditorium. This edition's jury includes screenwriter Will Tracy and actor and producer Georgia Hirst.

Cate Blanchett has been announced as the recipient of the edition's Impact Award, recognising her work with the Displacement Film Fund, which supports short films made by refugees and filmmakers living in displacement.
