= Sveinn Ólafur Gunnarsson =

Icelandic film and theater actor (born 1976)

- Born: 1976 (age 49–50); Iceland
- Education: Iceland Academy of the Arts
- Occupations: Actor, writer
- Years active: 2006-Present
- Awards: Nomination, 2014 Edda Award, Supporting Actor of the Year for Metalhead Nomination, 2012 Edda Award, Actor of the Year for Either Way Nomination, 2012 Nordic Council Film Prize for Either Way

Sveinn Ólafur Gunnarsson is an Icelandic stage and film actor who starred in and co-wrote 2011's Either Way, Ragnar Bragason's Metalhead and Baltasar Kormákur's The Deep.

== Career ==
Sveinn Ólafur stars in the film Rams which premiered in the Un Certain Regard section at the 2015 Cannes Film Festival. He also stars in the American film Autumn Lights.

He has also starred in television: he played Valdi in the Icelandic crime mini-series Stella Blómkvist, and appeared in the second episode of the first season of the American IFC satirical series Documentary Now!

== Selected filmography ==
- Let Me Fall (2018)
- Stella Blómkvist (2018)
- Cruelty (2016)
- Heartstone (2016)
- Autumn Lights (2016)
- Rams (2015)
- Blóðberg (2015)
- Life in a Fishbowl (2014)
- Grave & Bones (2014)
- Metalhead (2013)
- Prince Avalanche (2013) (writer)
- The Deep (2013)
- Either Way (2011)
- Heimsendir (2011 TV Mini-series)
- Jar City (2006)
