= Either Way (film) =

2011 film

- Directed by: Hafsteinn Gunnar Sigurðsson
- Written by: Hafsteinn Gunnar Sigurðsson; Sveinn Ólafur Gunnarsson
- Produced by: Árni Filippusson; Davíð Óskar Ólafsson; Hreinn Beck; Tobias Munthe; Theo Youngstein
- Starring: Hilmar Guðjónsson
- Cinematography: Árni Filippusson
- Release date: 2 September 2011
- Running time: 85 minutes
- Country: Iceland
- Language: Icelandic

Either Way (Icelandic: Á annan veg) is a 2011 Icelandic comedy film directed by Hafsteinn Gunnar Sigurðsson. Writer-director David Gordon Green and Dogfish Pictures remade Either Way in 2013 as Prince Avalanche.

== Cast ==
- Hilmar Guðjónsson as Alfreð
- Sveinn Ólafur Gunnarsson as Finnbogi
- Þorsteinn Bachmann as the truck driver
- Valgerður Rúnarsdóttir
