= Our Last =

2015 Italian drama film

- Promotional poster
- Italian: Il nostro ultimo
- Directed by: Ludovico Di Martino
- Written by: Ludovico Di Martino
- Starring: Fabrizio Colica; Guglielmo Poggi
- Cinematography: Martina Diana
- Edited by: Ludovico Di Martino; Emma Viali
- Music by: Carlo Purpura
- Production companies: Blue&Berry; Dispàrte
- Release date: 9 November 2015 (Arcipelago Film Festival)
- Running time: 92 minutes
- Country: Italy
- Language: Italian

Our Last (Italian: Il nostro ultimo) is a 2015 Italian drama film directed by Ludovico Di Martino, and starring Fabrizio Colica and Guglielmo Poggi.

The film had its premiere on 9 November 2015 at the Arcipelago Film Festival in Rome. On 16 June 2016, it was presented at the Cinema Nuovo Sacher by Nanni Moretti and was subsequently released by Pablo Distribuzione. It won Best Film at the Ferrara Film Festival and Best Actor for Guglielmo Poggi at the Milan International Film Festival.

== Cast ==
- Fabrizio Colica as Fabrizio
- Guglielmo Poggi as Guglielmo
- Paola Rinaldi as the mother
- Pietro De Silva as the father
- Giobbe Covatta as the priest
- Pierfrancesco Poggi as the uncle
- Margherita Laterza as Our Lady of the Sheep
- Jean Christophe Folly as D'Artagnan
