= Carbognano =

- Comune
- Comune di Carbognano
- Location within Italy Location within Lazio
- Coordinates: 42°19′N 12°15′E
- Country: Italy
- Region: Lazio
- Province: Province of Viterbo (VT)

Area
  - Total: 17.2 km^{2} (6.6 sq mi)
- Elevation: 394 m (1,293 ft)

Population (Dec. 2004)
  - Total: 1,992
  - Density: 116/km^{2} (300/sq mi)
- Time zone: UTC+1 (CET)
  - Summer (DST): UTC+2 (CEST)
- Postal code: 01030
- Dialing code: 0761
- Website: Official website

Carbognano is a comune (municipality) in the Province of Viterbo in the Italian region of Latium, located about 50 kilometres (31 mi) northwest of Rome and about 15 kilometres (9 mi) southeast of Viterbo. As of 31 December 2004, it had a population of 1,992 and an area of 17.2 square kilometres (6.6 mi^{2}).

Carbognano borders the following municipalities: Caprarola, Fabrica di Roma, Nepi, Vallerano.

== Demographic evolution ==
Historical population

Year	Pop.	±%
1861	?	—
1871	1,915	—
1881	1,917	+0.1%
1901	2,034	+6.1%
1911	2,020	−0.7%

Year	Pop.	±%
1921	2,109	+4.4%
1931	2,246	+6.5%
1936	2,220	−1.2%
1951	2,280	+2.7%
1961	2,147	−5.8%

Year	Pop.	±%
1971	2,006	−6.6%
1981	1,910	−4.8%
1991	2,012	+5.3%
2001	1,918	−4.7%

Source: Data from ISTAT
