= Embrace of the Serpent =

2015 film

- Theatrical poster
- Directed by: Ciro Guerra
- Written by: Ciro Guerra; Jacques Toulemonde Vidal
- Produced by: Cristina Gallego
- Starring: Jan Bijvoet; Nilbio Torres; Antonio Bolívar; Brionne Davis
- Cinematography: David Gallego
- Edited by: Etienne Boussac
- Music by: Nascuy Linares
- Production companies: Buffalo Films; Buffalo Producciones; Caracol Televisión; Ciudad Lunar Producciones; Dago García Producciones; MC Producciones; Nortesur Producciones
- Distributed by: Diaphana Films
- Release dates: 15 May 2015 (Cannes); 21 May 2015 (Colombia)
- Running time: 125 minutes
- Countries: Colombia; Venezuela; Argentina
- Languages: Ocaina; Cubeo; Minika; Ticuna; Wanano; Spanish; Portuguese; German; Catalan; Latin; English
- Budget: $1.4 million
- Box office: $3.4 million

Embrace of the Serpent (Spanish: El abrazo de la serpiente) is a 2015 internationally co-produced adventure drama film directed by Ciro Guerra, and written by Guerra and Jacques Toulemonde Vidal. Shot almost entirely in black and white, the film follows two journeys made thirty years apart by the indigenous shaman Karamakate in the Colombian Amazonian jungle, one with Theo, a German ethnographer, and the other with Evan, an American botanist, both of whom are searching for the rare plant yakruna. It was inspired by the travel diaries of Theodor Koch-Grünberg and Richard Evans Schultes, and dedicated to lost Amazonian cultures.

Embrace of the Serpent premiered on 15 May 2015 during the Directors' Fortnight section at the 2015 Cannes Film Festival, where it won the Art Cinema Award. The film was released in Colombia on 21 May 2015, and worldwide over the course of the following twelve months. It has received universal acclaim from critics, who praised the cinematography and the story's theme, the destruction of the Amazon rainforest and way of life by white colonialism. It has won numerous awards, including the Alfred P. Sloan Prize at the 2016 Sundance Film Festival, the Grand Jury Prize for Best Picture at the 2017 Riviera International Film Festival, and seven awards at the 3rd Platino Awards to recognise the best Ibero-American films of 2015, including the Platino Award for Best Ibero-American Film. In 2016 the film was submitted as Colombia's entry for the category of Best Foreign Language Film at the 88th Academy Awards and was included among the final five nominees, becoming the first Colombian film to receive a nomination for the award.

== Plot ==
The film tells two stories thirty years apart, both featuring Karamakate, an Amazonian shaman and last survivor of his tribe. He travels with two scientists, firstly with the German Theo von Martius in 1909 and then with an American named Evan in 1940, to look for the rare yakruna, a (fictional) sacred plant.

Theo, an ethnographer from Tübingen who has already been residing in the Amazon for several years, is very sick and is travelling by canoe with his field notes and a westernised local named Manduca whom he had saved from enslavement on a rubber plantation. Karamakate prolongs his life, blasting white powder called "the sun's semen" (identified later in the film as chiricaspi) up his nose, but is reluctant to become involved with a westerner and refuses his money. Theo is searching for yakruna as the only cure for his disease and the three set off in the canoe to search for it.

Thirty years later an American botanist, Evan, paddles up to a much older Karamakate who has apparently forgotten the customs of his own people. Evan says he is hoping to complete Theo's quest and Karamakate does assist, again reluctantly, saying his knowledge is spent. Evan has a book of Theo's final trek, which his aide had sent back to Europe, as he did not survive the jungle. The book includes an image of Karamakate, which he refers to as his chullachaqui, a native term for hollow spirit. Karamakate agrees to help him only when Evan describes himself as someone who has devoted himself to plants, although Evan's real purpose is actually to secure disease-free rubber trees, since the United States' supplies of rubber from South East Asia had dwindled due to the Japanese wartime advance.

Both expeditions feature a Spanish Catholic Mission by the side of an Amazon tributary, run in 1909 by a sadistic, lone Spanish priest who beats orphan boys for any "pagan" behaviour, and in 1940 by a delusional Brazilian figure who believes he is the Messiah. He only trusts the visitors when he believes they are the Biblical Magi, but Karamakate wins his respect when he heals his wife. By now the children of 1909 have grown into disturbed and violent acolytes.

In 1909, we are left with Theo, sick and having fled the Mission, arriving at a frontier post just about to be invaded by Colombian soldiers during the Amazon rubber boom, where the sacred yakruna is being abused by drunken men, and cultivated, against local traditions. Karamakate is furious and destroys it. In 1940, Karamakate does show Evan the origin of the plant in striking denuded dome-shaped mountains (Cerros de Mavecure), allegedly the home of yakruna. He reveals one yakruna flower that is on the last plant – he has destroyed all the others – and prepares it for Evan. The preparation, being hallucinogenic, aids Evan in undergoing a superconscious experience. While most of the film is in black-and-white, a part of this experience is shown in colour to signify its intensity. The film ends with a transformed Evan remaining enamoured by a group of butterflies.

== Cast ==
In Cineaste magazine, the film's writer and director Ciro Guerra noted how the process of finding an actor who can successfully communicate the film's narrative was considered to be a difficult task. After his attempt in reaching out to a variety of indigenous people, it had come to his attention that the older generation were completely detached from the time depicted within the film. Through watching a film over 10 years earlier in a workshop with Colombia's Ministry of Culture, Guerra was able to find the perfect actor, Antonio Bolívar. Bolívar's two minute presence in the short film had a great impact on Guerra, encouraging him to pursue appointing him the role of Karamakate as "There was nobody else that could play this guy. He's one of the last Ocaina people remaining. There's only about sixteen of them left."

The cast are as follows:

- Nilbio Torres as Young Karamakate
- Antonio Bolívar as Old Karamakate
- Jan Bijvoet as Theo
- Brionne Davis as Evan
- Luigi Sciamanna as Gaspar
- Yauenkü Migue as Manduca
- Nicolás Cancino as Anizetto

== Themes ==
The film explores the representation of the first people nations of the Amazon. In the film multiple languages are spoken: Ocaina (which is most frequently spoken), Ticuna, Bora, Andoque, Yucuna (Jukuna), and Muinane. The indigenous peoples are shown to have suffered at the hands of colonizers, and Colombian film critic and author Pedro Adrián Zuluaga states that Guerra highlights this by "shooting peripheric geographies... and bringing to the centre of the narrative an unavoidable contradiction between progress and tradition". Daniela Berghahn, professor of film studies at the Royal Holloway, University of London, notes how through time-lapse, Guerra highlights the pillaging of the Amazon rain forest by conquistadors, missionaries and rubber barons, and also the enslavement and degradation of the indigenous peoples, who were converted to Christianity — the character Manduca is both enslaved and Westernised — at the cost of their traditions and beliefs. Similarly, Nicolás Cadena wrote for NACLA that Guerra's filmmaking illustrates how "the white man’s knowledge, expressed through symbols like the compass and the characters of Theo and Evans, extracts the spirit, tradition, and humanity of the indigenous inhabitants much like rubber is extracted from the Amazonian rubber trees". The black and white cinematography bears similarity to the daguerreotype photography of early twentieth-century explorers who initially documented the Amazon and inspired the film.

== Production ==
Before production started, the director spent two and a half years researching the Colombian Amazon. They discovered a part of the jungle in the north west that had not yet been heavily affected by tourism or commerce and after gaining permission from the local community, they decided on the location. The pre-production and shooting took place over the course of three months with the help of around 40 people from outside the Amazon and 60 people from indigenous communities within the Amazon. The director extensively collaborated with the community and invited them to participate and collaborate both in front and behind the camera. To avoid any problems caused by the harsh environment, the indigenous people taught the crew how to work with the jungle and performed rituals for spiritual protection. There were no accidents or illnesses and the shooting ran smoothly. Additionally, to improve accuracy, indigenous individuals worked with Guerra to translate and rewrite parts of the script.

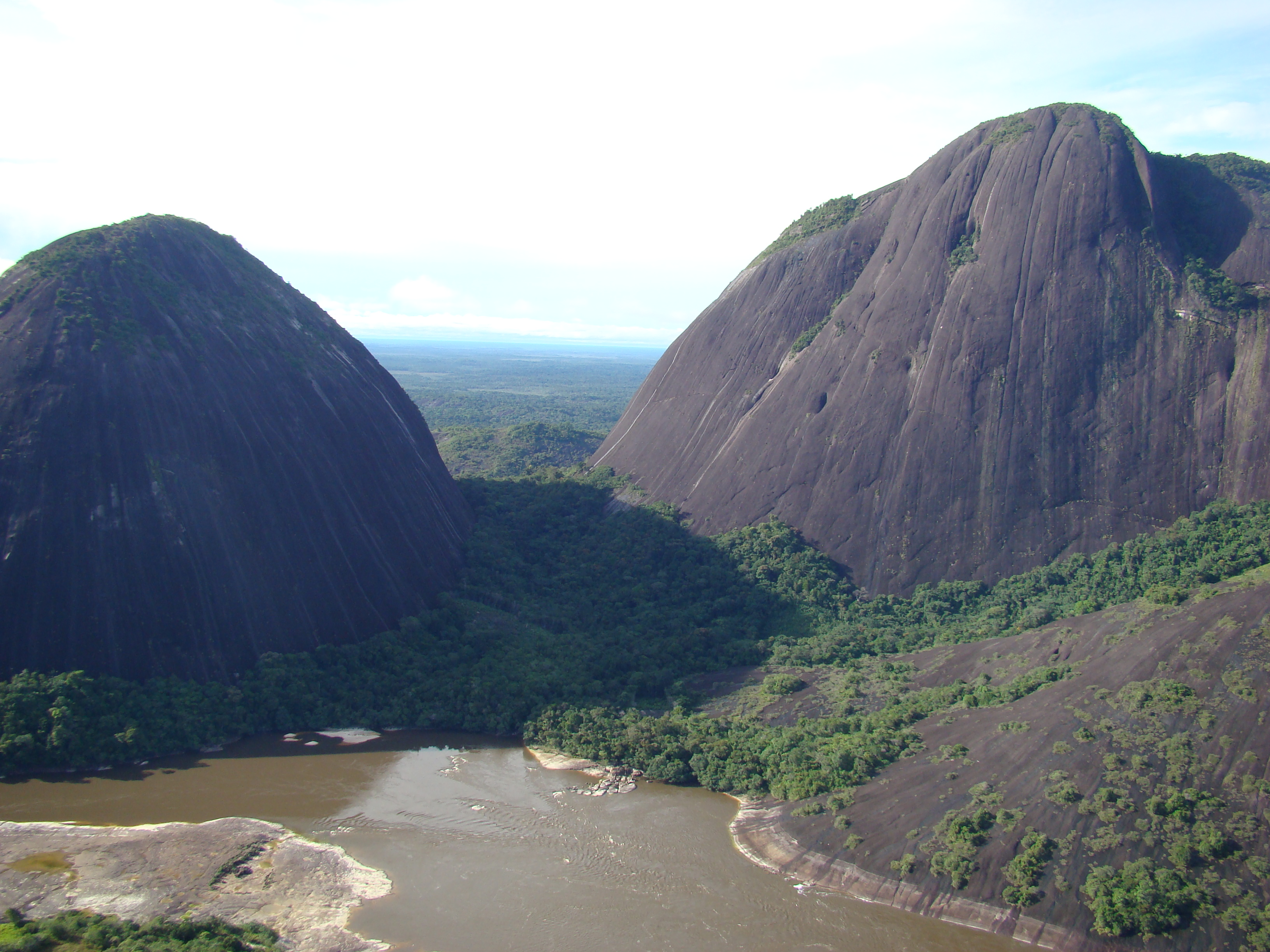
Cerro Mono and Cerro Pajarito, in the Mavicure Hills, which feature in the film.

Embrace of the Serpent was filmed in the Amazonía region of Colombia. Seven weeks were spent filming in the Department of Vaupés, and one week in the Department of Guainía. Location details include:

- Cerros de Mavicure – three mounds that form part of the westernmost part of the Guiana Shield in northern South America.
- Fluvial Star Inírida – a Ramsar Wetland that includes part of the Inírida River.
- Vaupés River – tributary of the Amazon River that forms part of the international border between Colombia and Brazil.

=== Crew ===
- Ciro Guerra – director, screenwriter
- Jacques Toulemonde – screenwriter
- Cristina Gallego – producer
- David Gallego – cinematographer
- Carlos E. García – sound designer, re-recording mixer, additional music composer
- Angélica Perea – production designer
- Catherine Rodriguez – costume designer
- Andrés Barrientos – acting coach
- Etienne Boussac – editor
- Nascuy Linares – music composer

== Soundtrack ==
The soundtrack album of the movie was released by Plaza Major Company on 22 January 2016 and contains nine songs composed by Nascuy Linares. The film also features The Creation by Joseph Haydn and the participation of Venezuelan conductor Gustavo Dudamel.

=== Track listing ===
No.	Title	Length
1.	"Embrace of the Serpent (Theme)"	1:59
2.	"Trance (Trance Aereo)"	1:59
3.	"Dantesque Celebration (Fiesta Dantesca)"	2:29
4.	"Acoutic River (Tema Brújula)"	3:17
5.	"Dudamel: Let the Children Play (End)"	1:41
6.	"Dudamel: Let the Children Play (Isla y Páramo)"	1:44
7.	"Dudamel: Let the Children Play – Sarabande (Based on a Theme by George Frideric Handel)"	2:02
8.	"Dudamel: Let the Children Play (Arpegios)"	0:50
9.	"Dudamel: Let the Children Play (Minor)"	1:44

== Reception ==
=== Critical response ===
The film has received universal acclaim from critics. Review aggregation website Rotten Tomatoes gives it a 96% approval rating, based on 145 reviews, with an average score of 8.3/10. The site's critical consensus reads, "As rich visually as it is thematically, Embrace of the Serpent offers a feast of the senses for film fans seeking a dose of bracing originality". On Metacritic, which assigns a normalised rating, the film has a score of 82 out of 100 based on 31 critics, indicating "universal acclaim".

Indiewire's Jessica Kiang awarded the film an A rating, calling it "a soulful, strange and stunning discovery". She also described the character of Karamakate as "an immaculate portrait of the unfathomable loneliness and crushing survivor's guilt that comes with being the last of one's kind". Jordan Mintzer of The Hollywood Reporter described the film as "a visually mesmerizing exploration of man, nature and the destructive powers of colonialism" and compared it to Miguel Gomes' Tabu (2012). He also praised the black-and-white cinematography and the sound design which he said "makes the jungle truly come alive". Justin Chang of Variety gave a positive review of the film. He wrote: "At once blistering and poetic, not just an ethnographic study but also a striking act of cinematic witness...". About the parallel narrative he wrote it "delivers a fairly comprehensive critique of the destruction of indigenous cultures at the hands of white invaders". Will Lawrence of Empire awarded the film four stars out of five and said that "though inspired by real-life journals, Guerra's film transports us into the realm of the mystical and surreal". Video essayist Kogonada voted for the film on Sight & Sound magazine's poll for best film of 2015, stating that "Embrace of the Serpent is a mesmerizing feat of cinema. Guerra had me at frame one."

=== Response from the indigenous community ===
The film was well received by the Amazonian community featured in the film. A special screening was held in the jungles of Colombia, in a makeshift cinema. With tribal people from all over the area showing up, not everyone could be seated. After the film finished, they asked for it to be shown again. Although the film was celebrated, director Ciro Guerra did stress that the film should not be used as an attempt to share traditional knowledge of the tribes, as what you see in the film "is an imagined Amazon because the real Amazon doesn't fit in one film".

=== Accolades ===
The film was screened in the Directors' Fortnight section at the 2015 Cannes Film Festival where it won the Art Cinema Award. The film won the Golden Apricot at the 2015 Yerevan International Film Festival, Armenia, for Best Feature Film; the Special Jury Award at the Odesa Film Festival, and the Spondylus Trophy at the Lima Film Festival.

The Governor of the Guainía Department decorated Ciro Guerra with the Order of the Inírida Flower for "exalting the respect and value of the indigenous populations, likewise giving the Department recognition for tourism and culture".

The film was announced as Colombia's submission for the 2016 Academy Award for Best Foreign Language Film, and was selected among the final five contenders, being the first Colombian film to be nominated for the award.

Award / Film Festival	Category	Result
Academy Awards	Best Foreign Language Film	Nominated
Australian Film Critics Association	Best International Film (Foreign Language)	Nominated
Cannes Film Festival	Art Cinema Award	Won
Hamptons International Film Festival	Golden Starfish for Narrative Feature − Honorable Mention	Won
Independent Spirit Awards	Best International Film	Nominated
46th International Film Festival of India	Golden Peacock (Best Film)	Won
Lima Film Festival	Best Fiction Featured Film	Won
Mar del Plata International Film Festival	Golden Ástor	Won
Munich Film Festival	Best International Film	Nominated
Odesa International Film Festival	International Competition Program - Special Jury Mention	Won
Pacific Meridian International Film Festival	Special Jury Award	Won
Rotterdam International Film Festival	Dioraphte Award	Won
San Sebastián International Film Festival	Best Latin-American Film	Nominated
Sundance Film Festival	Alfred P. Sloan Prize	Won
Yerevan International Film Festival	Golden Apricot Award	Won
Riviera International Film Festival	Grand Jury Prize for Best Picture	Won
Riviera International Film Festival	Jury Prize for Best Director	Nominated

=== Top ten lists ===
In The Observer Mark Kermode included Embrace of the Serpent in his top ten list of best films of 2016. Embrace of the Serpent is ranked 2nd in Rotten Tomatoes' Best-Reviewed Foreign Language Movies 2016, and 23rd in the Top 100 Movies of 2016 list. It also was named the 12th best film of 2016 by Esquire. Sight & Sound ranked it 21st with seven votes.

Some other top ten lists in which Embrace of the Serpent was listed are:

- 1st – J. R. Jones, Chicago Reader
- 2nd – Lincoln Journal Star
- 2nd – Randy Myers, San Jose Mercury News
- 3rd – Little White Lies
- 4th – Stephen Holden, The New York Times
- 4th – The Irish Times
- 7th – Time Out London
- 8th – Brian Formo, Collider
- 10th – Simon Abrams, RogerEbert.com

== See also ==
- List of submissions to the 88th Academy Awards for Best Foreign Language Film
- List of Colombian submissions for the Academy Award for Best Foreign Language Film
- List of films featuring hallucinogens
