= Metalhead (film) =

2013 film

- Promotional release poster
- Directed by: Ragnar Bragason
- Written by: Ragnar Bragason
- Produced by: Árni Filippusson; Davíd Óskar Ólafsson
- Starring: Thora Bjorg Helga; Ingvar Eggert Sigurðsson; Sveinn Ólafur Gunnarsson
- Cinematography: August Jakobsson
- Edited by: Valdís Óskarsdóttir
- Music by: Pétur Ben
- Distributed by: Cinelicious Pics; eOne Films
- Release dates: 7 September 2013 (Toronto); 11 October 2013 (Iceland)
- Running time: 97 minutes
- Country: Iceland
- Languages: Icelandic; English; Norwegian

Metalhead (Icelandic: Málmhaus) is a 2013 Icelandic comedy-drama film written and directed by Ragnar Bragason. Starring Thora Bjorg Helga, Ingvar Eggert Sigurðsson, and Sveinn Ólafur Gunnarsson, the film follows Hera Karlsdóttir (Helga), an aspiring black metal musician who returns to her family farm as she and her estranged parents struggle coming to terms with the death of her older brother Baldur in a tractor accident nine years prior.

Metalhead premiered in the Contemporary World Cinema section at the Toronto International Film Festival on 7 September 2013, and was theatrically released in Iceland on 11 October 2013.

== Plot ==
In the summer of 1983, twelve-year-old Hera Karlsdóttir lives a normal life on her family farm in a close-knit community. One afternoon, Hera witnesses her older brother Baldur fall off a tractor before his long hair is scalped by its blades. Baldur's parents drive him in their pickup truck to hospital, but he dies from his injury. At his funeral, Hera glares at a portrait of Jesus Christ on the wall and runs out of the church. After returning home, Hera enters Baldur's bedroom, where she picks up his guitar and starts playing. Upon glaring at the numerous posters of metal bands adorning his bedroom walls, Hera experiences an awakening. As a result, she burns all of her old clothes and adopts her brother's metal music and fashion.

Nine years later, in 1992, Hera, now twenty-one, and her parents are still grieving Baldur's death. Her mother and father, Droplaug and Karl, attempt to regain a sense of normalcy by participating in the village church choir, where they meet the new priest, Janus, who is rumored to be gay. Hera's lifestyle stands out amongst the community and is bullied by other youths, who call her a Satanist. She frequently gets into trouble, doing things such as playing her guitar too loudly in the house and drunkenly stealing her neighbor's tractor. At the insistence of her mother, Hera gets a job at a slaughterhouse, but is fired for playing metal music over the loudspeakers and scaring off the livestock. Hera accompanies her parents to a church sermon, but is told to leave for smoking inside. As she walks out and grieves over Baldur's grave, Janus tries reaching out to her, but she rebuffs him. Hera later attends a community ball, but is kicked out after trying to start a moshpit.

Hera's childhood friend Knútur comes with her as she returns home, where they have sex. Knútur tries to start a conversation with Hera afterwards, but she turns away and leaves the room. One night, Hera overhears a news report on TV about the black metal scene in Norway and the arson attacks against several churches associated with it, which piques her interest, and influences her to don corpse paint the next morning. Later that night, Knútur comes over to her house to propose to her, but she rejects him and tosses the ring out of his hands. The next morning, she furiously herds all of her family's cattle out of the barn into the freezing Icelandic winter. In the wake of Hera's behaviour, her parents invite Janus to their house for counseling. He agrees to help Hera, and reveals his Eddie tattoo to her, admitting that he is secretly a metalhead. They start having a friendly discourse on the topic, but when Janus tries talking to Hera on an emotional level, she attempts to seduce him, causing him to leave. That night, Droplaug talks to Karl in the garage, who breaks down, blaming himself for his son's death.

As Janus continues reaching out to Hera, she shows him some mixtapes, and they continue to bond. Still mesmerized by the news report, Hera records a black metal demo of her own, and sends several copies of the tape out in the post. Meanwhile, Karl and Droplaug finally open up to each other and their relationship rapidly improves. Later, Hera visits Janus and begins exhibiting romantic feelings for him, but he confesses that he does not feel mutually about her.

Heartbroken and angry, Hera sets fire to the community church and runs away from home. Gathering supplies and a gun, she heads off into the nearby mountains to stay in an old hunting shack. However, as the weather becomes colder, and she starts hallucinating her brother, Hera returns home. Upon entering Knútur's house, Hera walks in on a town meeting, where she breaks down and is forgiven by everyone. As they discuss reconciliation for her actions, the townspeople reveal they will not release her identity as the arsonist. Hera offers to pay for the damage to the church herself, but out of empathy and realism, the townspeople decide they will all repay and repair it together. Hera then moves in with Knútur and his father, but is pushed into giving up metal altogether, and becomes bored.

Some time later, three men from Norway arrive in the village to visit Hera. The men had come across her demo on the tape trading scene in Oslo and, highly impressed with it, want to release it on their record label. They are even more impressed when Hera reveals that she recorded the demo on her own, not as part of a band. Later that day, Droplaug talks to Hera and, perceiving her discontent, tells her that it is important for her to be happy. After rebuilding the church with the townspeople, Hera apologizes to Knútur, telling him that she loves him but not romantically. However, an enraged Knútur confronts her for mistreating him and leaves.

Some time later, Hera moves back in with her parents. She also forms a band with the Norwegians and performs for the entire town. They try playing her black metal material, but the audience cannot tolerate her vocals and the band stops playing it. They ultimately play a modified version of the black metal song with a slower tempo and clean vocals, satisfying both the audience and the band.

The next morning, Droplaug joins Hera in her bedroom and they reminisce about Baldur, both eventually agreeing that life goes on. Taking this into account, Hera and her parents play "Symphony of Destruction" and dance together, the trio finally bonding as a family.

== Cast ==
- Thora Bjorg Helga as Hera Karlsdóttir
  - Diljá Valsdóttir as 11-year-old Hera
- Ingvar Eggert Sigurðsson as Karl, Hera's father
- Halldóra Geirharðsdóttir as Droplaug, Hera's mother
- Sveinn Ólafur Gunnarsson as Janus, the new priest
- Hannes Óli Ágústsson as Knútur, Hera's fiancé
  - Mikael Kaaber as 11-year-old Knútur
- Þórunn Arna Kristjánsdóttir as Elsa, Hera's childhood friend
  - Urður Heimisdóttir as 11-year-old Elsa
- Óskar Logi Ágústsson as Baldur, Hera's brother
- Þröstur Leó Gunnarsson as Einar
- Magnús Ólafsson as Erlingur
- Hilmar Wollan III as Øystein
- Ole Erik Furu as Yngve
- Sigrún Edda Björnsdóttir as Anna
- Pétur Einarsson as Traveller

== Reception ==
Metalhead was well received by critics, earning a rating of "92% fresh" on Rotten Tomatoes, as of May 2025.
