= Baltasar Breki Samper =

Icelandic actor

- Born: Baltasar Breki Baltasarsson; Reykjavík, Iceland
- Education: Iceland University of the Arts
- Occupation: Actor
- Years active: 2000–present
- Father: Baltasar Kormákur

Baltasar Breki Samper, sometimes referred to as Baltasar Breki Baltasarsson, is an Icelandic actor. He is known for his role as Hjörtur in the 2015 Icelandic TV series Trapped.

== Early life and education ==
Baltasar Breki was born in Reykjavík, Iceland, to choreographer Ástrós Gunnarsdóttir and actor and film director Baltasar Kormákur Baltasarsson (better known as Baltasar Kormákur). He is the grandson of Catalan painter Baltasar Samper. When he was a boy he attended ballroom dancing classes.

He graduated from high school at Menntaskólinn í Reykjavík in 2008. During the first two years he was part of the school's drama department, but decided to quit in his third year to focus on other studies. When he was 18 years old, his father threw him out of the house. He later described himself as "a troubled teen and not very interested in school".

Before graduating from the Iceland Academy of the Arts in 2015, Baltasar Breki helped his father on several films as second assistant director.

== Career ==
Baltasar Breki is known for his role as Hjörtur in the Icelandic TV series Trapped.

== Filmography ==
=== Film ===
Year	Title	Role	Notes
2000	101 Reykjavík		Uncredited
2004	Dís		
2007	The Quiet Storm	Diddi	Original title: Veðramót
2008	White Night Wedding	Student	Original title: Brúðguminn
2012	The Deep		Original title: Djúpið
2018	Vultures	Erik	Original title: Vargur

=== Television ===
Year	Title	Role	Notes
2015–2019	Trapped	Hjörtur Stefánsson	Series regular; 19 episodes
2019	Chernobyl	Ananenko	Recurring role; 2 episodes
2019	Venjulegt fólk	Jón Pétur	Episode: "Nennirðu að passa"
2020	Thin Ice	American Soldier	Episode: "Del 8"
2021	Katla	Kjartan	Series regular; 8 episodes

== Theatre credits ==
Year	Title	Role	Venue	Ref
2015	The Heart of Robin Hood	Much the Miller's Son	National Theatre of Iceland, Reykjavík	
2015	Sporvagninn Girnd	Stanley Kowalski	National Theatre of Iceland, Reykjavík	
2016	Djöflaeyjan	Grjóni	National Theatre of Iceland, Reykjavík	
2017	Gott Fólk	Grímar	National Theatre of Iceland, Reykjavík	
