= David Stefansson =

David Stefansson may refer to:

- Davíð Stefánsson (1895–1964), Icelandic poet and novelist
- David Mar Stefansson (born 1991), Icelandic screenwriter and producer
