= Högni Egilsson =

Icelandic musician (born 1985)

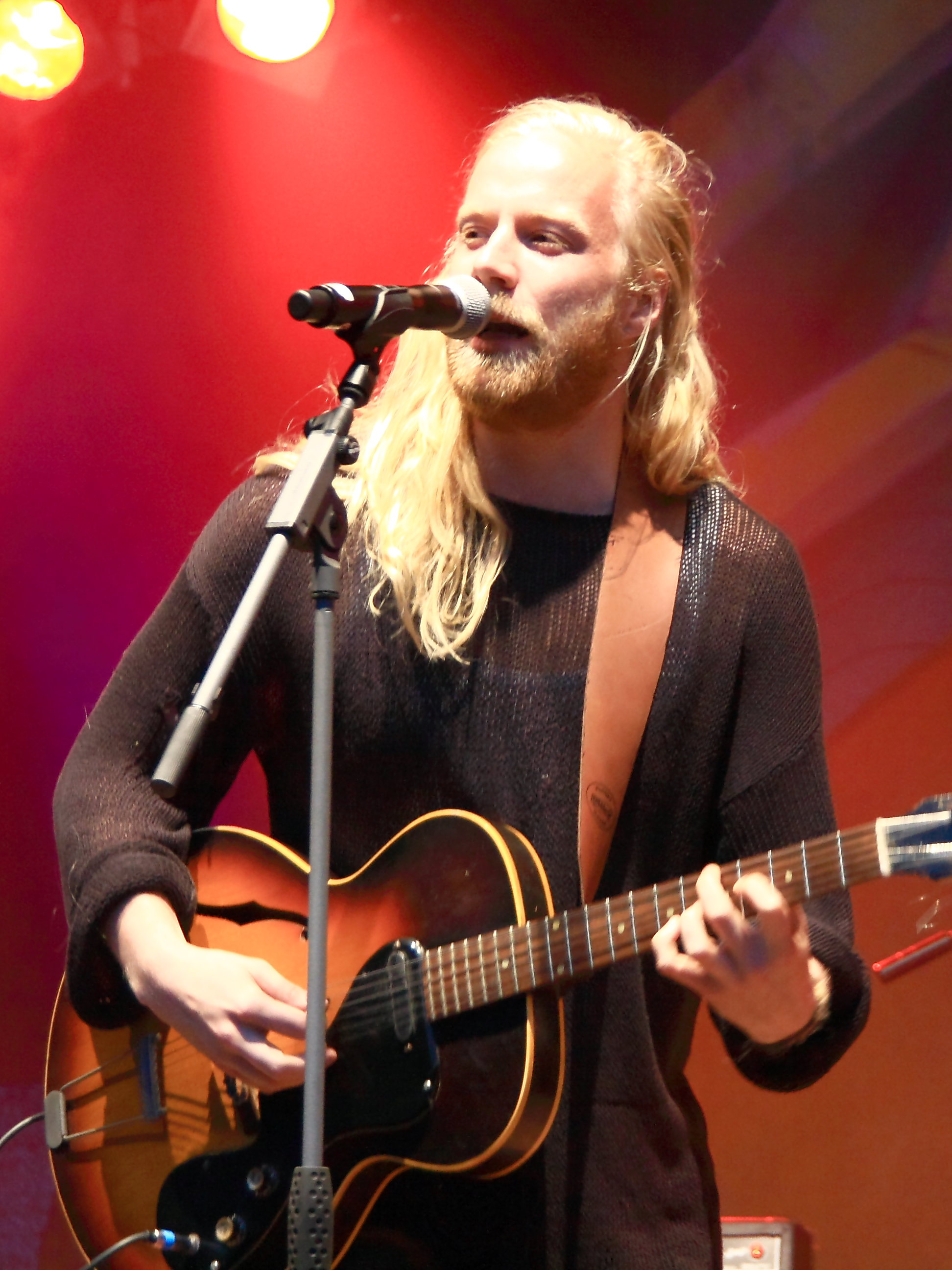
- Högni in 2011

Background information
- Born: 3 October 1985 (age 40)
- Origin: Reykjavík, Iceland
- Genres: Indie
- Occupation: Musician
- Instruments: Vocals; guitar
- Years active: 2004–present
- Labels: Erased Tapes
- Member of: Hjaltalín

Högni Egilsson (born 3 October 1985) is an Icelandic musician. He is the lead singer and guitarist of the band Hjaltalín, and he performs solo under the name Högni.

== Discography ==
=== with Hjaltalín ===
Albums

- Sleepdrunk Seasons (2007)
- Terminal (2009)
- Enter 4 (2012)
- Days of Gray (2014)
- Hjaltalín (2020)

=== as Högni ===
Albums

- Two Trains (2017)

==== Soundtracks ====
- Katla (Soundtrack from the Netflix series) (2023)
- Touch (Original Motion Picture Soundtrack) (2024)
- King & Conqueror (2025)
- Apex (2026)

EPs

- Stay Close to Me (2018) with andhim

Singles

- "Innsæi" (2018)
- "Paradísarmissir" (2019)
- "Sensus Terrae (Voice of Katla)" (2021) with GDRN
- "Anda þinn Guð" (2022) with Hatis Noit
- "Dolorem" (2023) with the Iceland Symphony Orchestra and Daníel Bjarnason
- "Gratandi Jeg thig Beiði" (2023) with Eron Thor Jónsson
