= Rutger Hoedemaekers =

- Born: Rutger Hoedemaekers
- Origin: Netherlands
- Occupations: Composer, Producer
- Instruments: Keyboards; piano; trumpet
- Labels: 130701, Milan Records
- Website: http://www.rutgerhoedemaekers.com

Rutger Hoedemaekers (born 1976) is a Dutch composer and producer.

== Career ==
=== Early life and career ===
Hoedemaekers' interest in music was first sparked when he started making electronic compositions on a Commodore Amiga 500 as a pre-teen and became part of the demoscene. A few years later, he worked as an ambient and techno producer within the emerging Dutch electronic music scene. He subsequently enrolled in the Royal Conservatory in The Hague, but left after one year and started working with rock bands instead, gaining experience in writing and producing.

=== 2006–2011: About, Voicst and move to Berlin ===
Hoedemaekers' first solo project came in the form of About, an indie electro-pop act. About's debut album Bongo was released on Jason Forrest's Cock Rock Disco label in 2006. For live shows, Hoedemaekers was joined on stage by Marg van Eenbergen.

In 2007, Hoedemaekers co-produced an album for an indie rock band Voicst alongside Peter Katis (Interpol, The National) and joined the band as a keyboard player. In the same year, Rutger moved to Berlin to start a modular studio in Kreuzberg together with two friends. This studio became a creative hub for composers like Jóhann Jóhannsson, Dustin O’Halloran and Hildur Gudnadottir.

He collaborated with a number of artists during that time, such as New York-based Ethel (string quartet) for Festival Mundial.

=== 2011–2015: Bart Constant ===
In Berlin, Rutger started his second solo project under the name Bart Constant. His debut Tell Yourself Whatever You Have To was released on PIAS Recordings in 2011 to critical acclaim. His video for the single Do Better, featuring Dustin O'Halloran, won Best Music Video at the Netherlands Film Festival that same year.

=== 2015–present: Film and TV score work ===
While still performing as Bart Constant, Hoedemaekers started working as a composer under his own name for film and TV. In 2015, Jóhann Jóhannsson asked him to co-compose the score for Icelandic crime series Trapped (BBC Four, France 2, ZDF), together with Hildur Gudnadottir. Their original score for the series was awarded with an Edda Award for Best Music in 2016. Hoedemaekers also worked with Jóhannsson on Darren Aronofsky's mother! and James Marsh's The Mercy, for which he composed additional music.

In 2018, Hoedemaekers scored his first feature as a solo composer for German production The Last Berliner, which won Best Feature at the Manchester Film Festival. He subsequently created the original score for Hulu and ARTE production No Man's Land, which premiered in 2020.

In 2020, Hoedemaekers signed with FatCat Records's imprint 130701. His debut record on the label, The Age of Oddities, was released on March 5, 2021.

In 2022, he contributed eight original pieces to Ed Perkins' HBO documentary The Princess, alongside a score by Martin Phipps. Hoedemaekers went on to create the original score for Shangri-La, Paradise Under Construction, which premiered at 2022 edition of IDFA.

Hoedemaekers also created the score for Angeline Jolie-directed feature Without Blood, starring Salma Hayek and Demián Bichir, which premiered at the Toronto International Film Festival in 2024.

== Discography ==
Studio albums

- The Age of Oddities (2021, FatCat Records/130701)

Soundtrack albums

- Trapped (2019, Milan Records)
- The Last Berliner (2019, Nouveau Goût)
- No Man's Land (2020, Lakeshore Records)
- Shangri-La, Paradise Under Construction (2023, Nouveau Goût)

== Filmography ==
Year	Film / Series	Director	Credits
2015-2022	Trapped	Baltasar Kormákur	Composer
2018	The Last Berliner	Gregor Erler	Composer
2018	The Mercy	James Marsh	Composer, additional music
2020	No Man's Land	Oded Ruskin	Composer
2022	The Princess	Ed Perkins	Composer, additional music
2022	Shangri-La, Paradise Under Construction	Mirka Duijn, Nina Spiering	Composer
2024	Without Blood	Angelina Jolie	Composer

== Awards and nominations ==
Year	Award	Nomination	Film	Result	Notes
2019	Action on Film International Film Festival	Best Score	The Last Berliner	Nominated	
2019	South Film and Arts Academy Festival	Original Score in a Feature Film	The Last Berliner	Won	
2016	Edda Award	Best Music	Trapped	Won	Shared with Hildur Guðnadóttir and Jóhann Jóhannsson
