= Hjaltalín =

Icelandic band

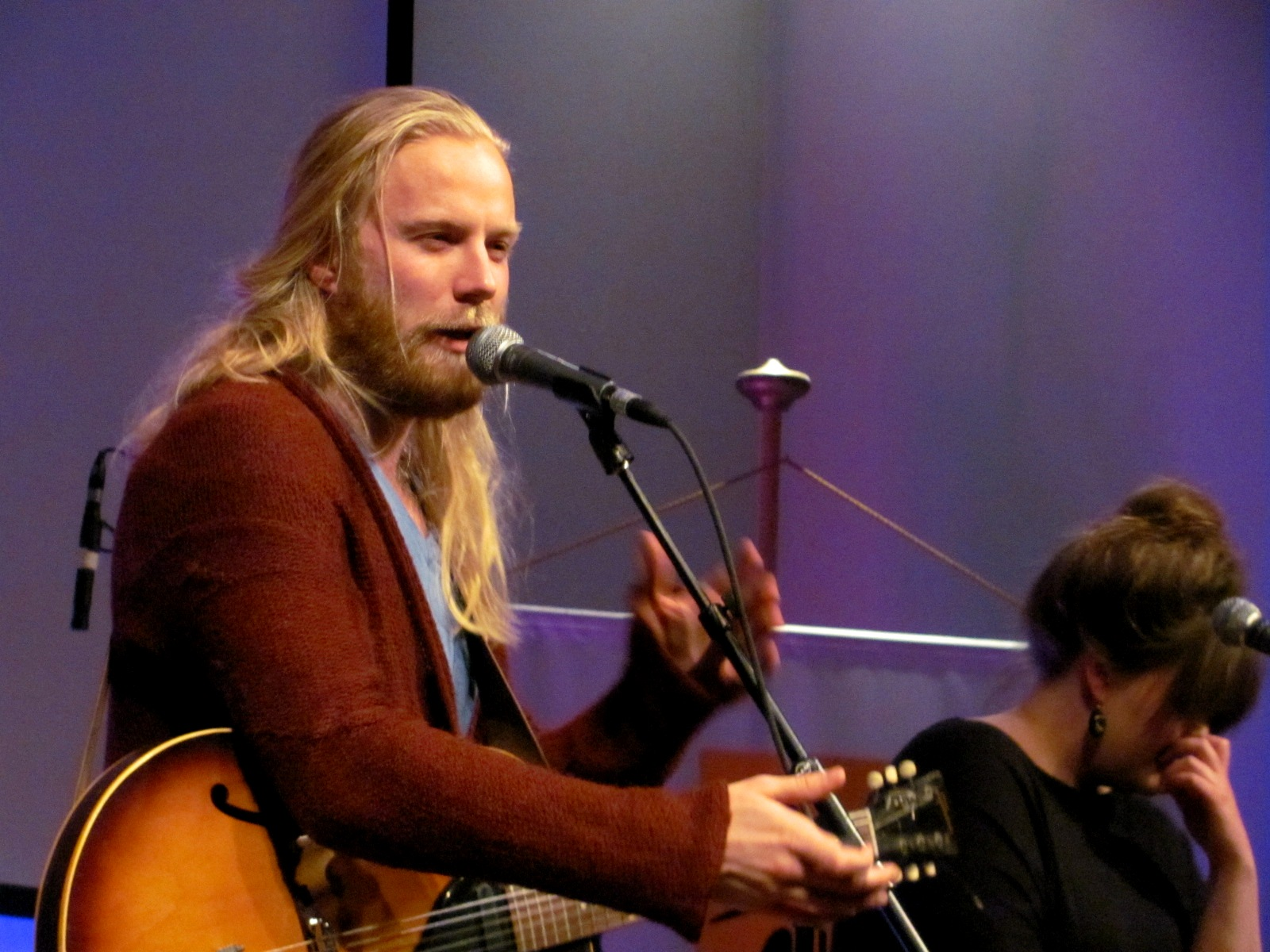
- Hjaltalín performing in 2011

Background information
- Origin: Reykjavík, Iceland
- Genres: Indie rock; indie pop
- Years active: 2004–present
- Labels: Kimi Records; Borgin; Hjaltalín
- Members: Sigríður Thorlacius; Viktor Orri Árnason; Högni Egilsson; Guðmundur Óskar Guðmundsson; Axel Haraldsson; Hjörtur Ingvi Jóhannsson
- Past members: Grímur Helgasson; Rebekka B. Björnsdóttir
- Website: hjaltalinmusic.com

Hjaltalín is an Icelandic indie rock band that has published four studio albums as of 2020. Their second record, Terminal, was chosen as the album of the year at the 2010 Icelandic Music Awards. They have also played throughout Europe, most notably at the Roskilde and Latitude festivals (2009) and at Sziget Festival (2010).

== History ==
Hjaltalín was formed in Reykjavík, Iceland, in 2004. Between January and October 2007, they recorded their first album, Sleepdrunk Seasons, in Reykjavík and Amsterdam. It was released on the Icelandic label Kimi Records first, and a European release followed in 2009. The band had a major hit with a cover of Paul Oscar's "Þú komst við hjartað í mér" in 2008, which proved to be the most popular song in Iceland that year. Hjaltalín's second album, Terminal, won an award at the 2010 Icelandic Music Awards. They have since issued two more studio albums: 2014's Enter 4 and the self-titled Hjaltalín in 2020. They have also published a soundtrack to the film Days of Gray (2014) and a live recording with the Iceland Symphony Orchestra, Alpanon, in 2010.

== Individual projects ==
Some members of the band have released solo work. Vocalist Sigríður Thorlacius published the album Jólakveðja in 2013. Högni Egilsson's Two Trains came out in 2017, and he has also scored a number of theatre, film, and television productions, including the 2021 Netflix series Katla. Violinist Viktor Orri Árnason released the album Eilífur in 2021.

== Band members ==
Current

- Axel Haraldsson – drums
- Guðmundur Óskar Guðmundsson – bass
- Hjörtur Ingvi Jóhannsson – piano, keyboards
- Högni Egilsson – vocals, guitar
- Sigríður Thorlacius – vocals
- Viktor Orri Árnason – violin

Former

- Grímur Helgason – clarinet
- Rebekka Bryndís Björnsdóttir – bassoon, percussion

== Discography ==
=== Albums ===
- Sleepdrunk Seasons (2007)
- Terminal (2009)
- Alpanon (Live recording with the Iceland Symphony Orchestra – 2010)
- Enter 4 (2012)
- Days of Gray (Original Motion Picture Soundtrack) (2014)
- Hjaltalín (2020)

=== Singles ===
- "Traffic Music" (2007)
- "Þú komst við hjartað í mér" (2008)
- "Sjómannavalsinn" (2009)
- "Stay By You" (2009)
- "Suitcase Man" (2009)
- "Engill alheimsins" (2013)
- "Halo" (2013)
- "We Will Live for Ages" (2015)
- "Baronesse" (2019)
- "Love from 99" (2019)

== Gallery ==
Photos from Aarhus, Denmark 2009

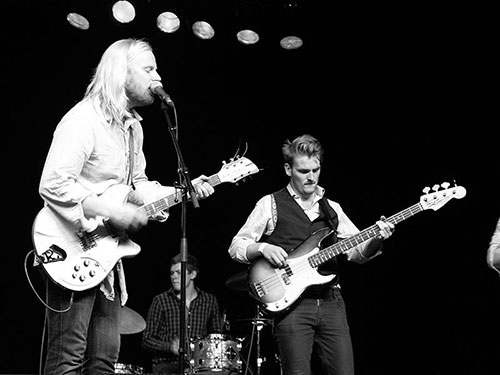

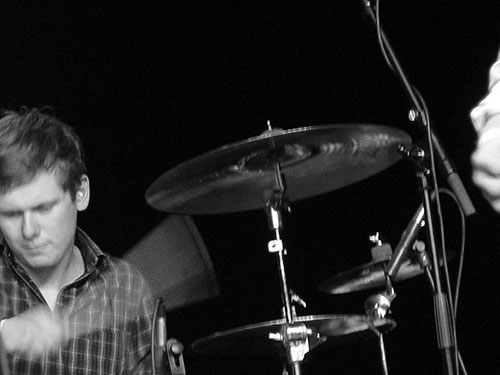

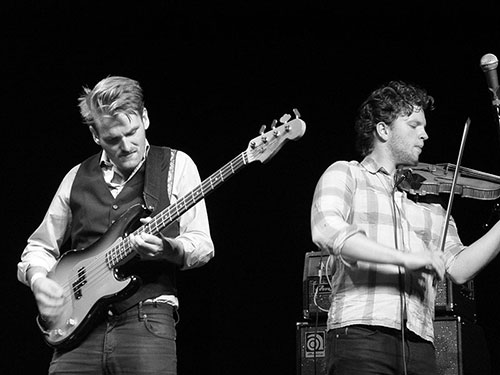

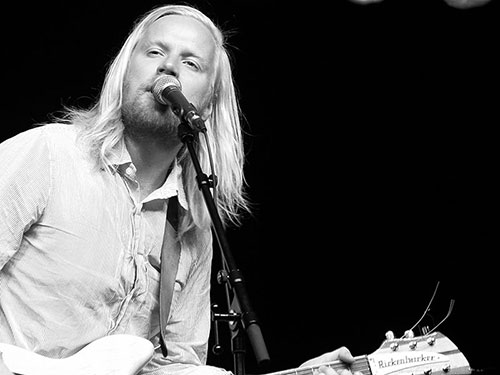

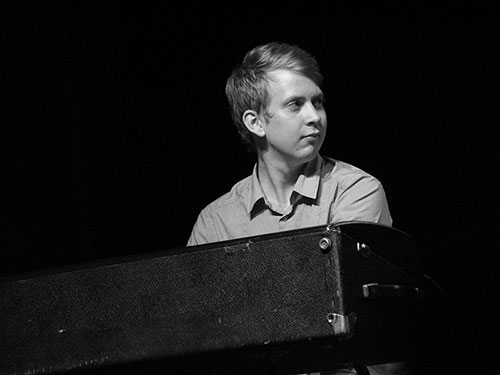

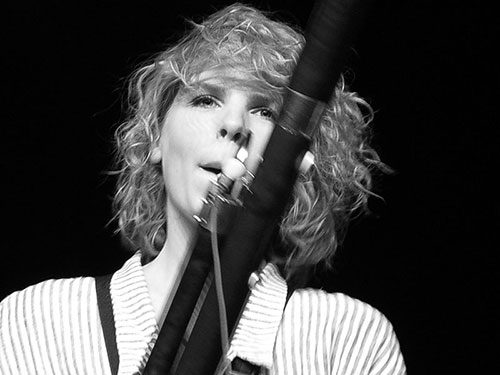

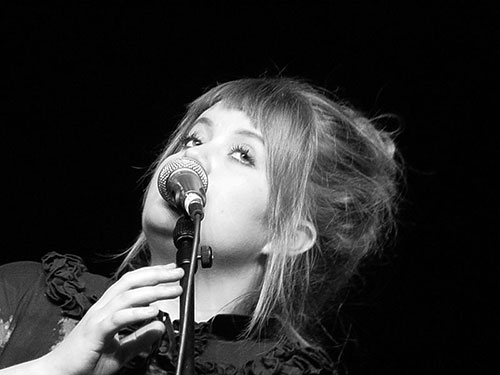

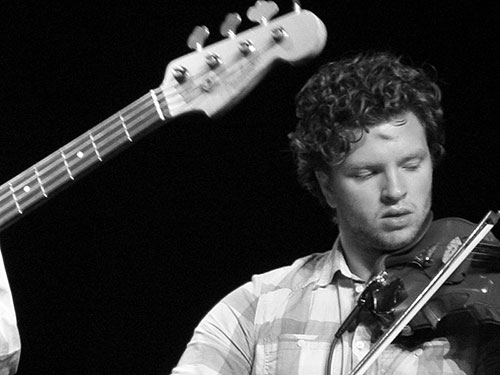
