= Guðlaugur =

Guðlaugur is an Icelandic masculine given name. Notable people with the name include:

- Guðlaugur Friðþórsson (born 1961), Icelandic fisherman and disaster survivor
- Guðlaugur Kristinn Óttarsson (born 1954), Icelandic musician
- Guðlaugur Victor Pálsson (born 1991), Icelandic footballer
- Guðlaugur Þór Þórðarson (born 1967), Icelandic politician
