= King & Conqueror =

2025 historical drama television series

- Genre: Historical drama
- Created by: Michael Robert Johnson
- Written by: Michael Robert Johnson; David Mar Stefansson; Sam Hoare; Rachel Kilfeather
- Directed by: Baltasar Kormákur; Bálint Szentgyörgyi; Nikolaj Coster-Waldau; Erik Leijonborg
- Starring: James Norton; Nikolaj Coster-Waldau; Emily Beecham; Clémence Poésy; Geoff Bell; Clare Holman; Ingvar Eggert Sigurðsson; Elliot Cowan; Luther Ford; Bo Bragason; Bjarne Henriksen; Jean-Marc Barr; Léo Legrand; Juliet Stevenson; Eddie Marsan; Oliver Masucci
- Music by: Högni Egilsson
- Countries of origin: United Kingdom; United States
- Original language: English
- No. of series: 1
- No. of episodes: 8

Production
- Executive producers: Kitty Kaletsky; James Norton; Robert Taylor; Nikolaj Coster-Waldau; Michael Robert Johnson; Lindsey Martin; Dave Clarke; Richard Halliwell; Ed Clarke; Magnús Viðar Sigurðsson; Baltasar Kormákur
- Producer: Robert Jones
- Editor: Sigurður Eyþórsson
- Production companies: CBS Studios; Rabbit Track Pictures; The Development Partnership; RVK Studios; Shepherd Content

Original release
- Network: BBC One (UK); Amazon Prime Video (US)
- Release: 24 August – 5 October 2025

King & Conqueror is a 2025 historical drama miniseries created by Michael Robert Johnson that premiered on 24 August 2025 on BBC One. It stars James Norton as Harold Godwinson and Nikolaj Coster-Waldau as William, Duke of Normandy, and depicts a fictionalised version of events leading up to the Norman Conquest of England. The series has received praise for its acting performances and criticism for pacing and historical inaccuracies.

== Premise ==
In 11th-century England, King Edward is on the throne but without an heir. Starting out as allies, Harold Godwinson and William, Duke of Normandy, become enemies as they fight for control of the English throne.

== Cast and characters ==
=== Main ===
- James Norton as Harold Godwinson
- Nikolaj Coster-Waldau as William, Duke of Normandy
- Emily Beecham as Edith, common-law wife of Harold (by Danish customary law)
- Clémence Poésy as Matilda, wife of William
- Geoff Bell as Godwin, Earl of Wessex, father of Harold
- Clare Holman as Gytha, mother of Harold
- Ingvar Sigurdsson as Fitzosbern, Lord of Breteuil, Normandy
- Elliot Cowan as Sweyn, older brother of Harold
- Luther Ford as Tostig, younger brother of Harold
- Bo Bragason as Queen Gunhild, based on the historical Edith of Wessex, sister of Harold
- Bjarne Henriksen as Siward, Earl of Northumbria
- Jean-Marc Barr as King Henry of France
- Léo Legrand as Odo of Bayeux
- Juliet Stevenson as Lady Emma, mother of Edward
- Eddie Marsan as King Edward of England
- Oliver Masucci as Baldwin, Count of Flanders, father of Matilda

=== Supporting ===
- Elander Moore as Morcar, Earl of Mercia
- Indy Lewis as Margaret, based on the historical Edith of Mercia, sister of Morcar whom Harold married in a church ceremony
- Calum Sivyer as Tallifer
- Vigdís Hrefna Pálsdóttir as Cécile
- Jason Forbes as Thane Thomas
- Ines Asserson as Judith of Flanders
- Valdimar Örn Flygenring as Baron George
- Björgvin Franz Gíslason as Baron Richard
- Sveinn Geirsson as Baron Montgomery
- Sveinn Ólafur Gunnarsson as King Hardrada
- Stormur Jón Kormákur Baltasarsson as Alain of Brittany
- Þorsteinn Bachmann as the Baron of Brittany

== Episodes ==
No.	Title	Directed by	Written by	Original release date	UK viewers (millions)
1	"Invitation"	Baltasar Kormákur	Michael Robert Johnson	24 August 2025	3.63
In 11th-century England, after a decade of civil war, peace has been achieved between the earldoms of Wessex, Mercia, and Northumbria. In Normandy, William is at war with Guy of Brionne. Despite the reservations of King Henry, William leaves to attend the coronation of his cousin Edward in England. Harold Godwinson finds evidence that the Mercians have resumed raiding and reports his findings to his father, Godwin, Earl of Wessex, who dismisses Harold's concerns to keep the peace. After arriving in England, William is saved by Harold from a group of bandits. William's wife, Matilda, captures Guy, who informs her that Henry had William's father killed to prevent him from allying with England. Upon receiving news of Guy's capture, Henry launches an invasion of Normandy. During Edward's coronation, Harold's wife, Edith, learns from Edward's wife, Gunhild, that Edward's mother, Lady Emma, has initiated the Mercian raids to provoke Wessex into war. Emma publicly declares that Edward will not father any children, angering Godwin, who married his daughter to Edward so Wessex would control the future of the throne. Emma then orders the Mercians to attack Dover, while William returns to Normandy amid Henry's invasion.
2	"The Sins of the Father"	Bálint Szentgyörgyi	Michael Robert Johnson	25 August 2025	2.65
Harold's mother Gytha learns that Edith is pregnant but implores her to keep it a secret to not burden Harold. Godwin and his sons are summoned before Edward, who declares them guilty of breaking the peace. Threatened with exile, Godwin agrees to give up his land and titles, and Emma informs him that her actions were to avenge the death of Aethel, Edward's brother, whom Godwin killed to ensure that the weaker Edward would inherit the throne. Godwin and his family prepare to take refuge in Flanders, while Gunhild plans to conceive a child with Edward to secure her family's future. Before they can leave Wessex, Morcar, Earl of Mercia, ambushes them and captures Edith. Harold and the rest of Godwin's family reach the coast and board boats to leave England. In France, Henry succeeds in taking Normandy, while William and Matilda flee to take refuge with her father, Baldwin, in Flanders, with Matilda giving birth during their journey. William requests Baldwin's help, but he decides to maintain Flanders' neutrality. Concerned for his newborn son's safety, William initially plans to give him away but changes his mind and names him Robert.
3	"Brothers"	Bálint Szentgyörgyi	Michael Robert Johnson & David Mar Stefansson	31 August 2025	2.64
Having settled in Flanders, Harold plans to return to England and rescue Edith. Godwin approves of Harold's plan but forces his youngest son, Tostig, to remain in Flanders while his eldest, Sweyn, takes command. Matilda learns from her cousin Judith that Baldwin has been in contact with Henry. Godwin and Baldwin later agree to allow Tostig and Judith to marry after they fall in love. Harold and William soon befriend each other and fend off a group of assassins. Fearing for Robert's safety, William gains the aid of the Barons of Normandy in setting a trap to kill Henry. After departing Flanders, Harold and Sweyn arrive in Wessex, but they are captured when Sweyn recklessly attacks the Mercian guards. Morcar tells Harold that Edith is pregnant and was taken to London, and Harold convinces him to join forces in exchange for half of the royal treasury. Harold next secures an alliance with Siward, Earl of Northumbria by ensuring that one of his grandchildren will succeed him. Harold and Sweyn then return to Flanders to inform Godwin of their success, and Harold convinces Godwin to make him the new Earl of Wessex, bypassing Sweyn, much to his anger.
4	"So Be It"	Bálint Szentgyörgyi	Sam Hoare	7 September 2025	2.27
The earls of England invade London, but Harold spares Edward so he can father an heir. Harold then frees Edith and meets his newborn daughter. During Tostig and Judith's wedding, Harold ignores Godwin's wishes and makes Tostig the Earl of Northumbria following news of Siward's death, inciting further resentment from Sweyn, who was promised the title. Believing Sweyn too unstable, Harold sends him on a religious pilgrimage. William springs his trap and retakes Normandy, but Henry escapes. Matilda learns from Baldwin that, should Henry die, he will become the guardian of Henry's heir, Philip. Baldwin tells William that Henry is hiding in Alsace, and William kills Henry in a duel. Gunhild informs Edward that Emma had secretly sent money to King Hardrada of Norway, causing a delusional Edward to beat his mother to death. Gunhild later intercepts a letter detailing Edward's plan to name William as his successor. Harold swears to his dying father that he will take the throne. In Norway, Hardrada receives a letter from Emma, stating that a promise made by her deceased husband, King Cnut, means that the ruler of Norway has a rightful claim to the English throne.
5	"The Beast in the Mirror"	Nikolaj Coster-Waldau	Michael Robert Johnson	14 September 2025	TBA
Harold sends his ally Thane Thomas to apprehend Sweyn, who had fled to France. Harold and Edith head to Normandy to inform William of his appointment as Edward's successor but are captured by the Baron of Brittany's men. William frees them, and Harold rescues William's injured advisor Fitzosbern. Harold proposes that he and William share control of the English throne, but William is apprehensive. William learns that his half-brother Odo has been ordained as the Bishop of Bayeux, and Odo agrees to help William gain influence with the church. A despondent Edward begins to show signs of madness due to Emma's death. Gunhild attempts to conceive a child with Edward, but he suffers a seizure. Tostig sends word to Harold for help before Judith dies in childbirth, along with the baby, causing Tostig grief. Thomas tracks down Sweyn and assassinates him after discovering that he is planning to retaliate against Harold. William holds a melee to celebrate Whitsun, which culminates in him and Harold fighting. Odo has Harold swear his loyalty to William over holy relics, and Harold states that he will support the rightful heir of England.
6	"Damage"	Erik Leijonborg	Rachel Kilfeather	21 September 2025	TBA
Harold visits a bedridden Edward, who declares with his dying words that England will soon be set ablaze. Harold and Gunhild falsely claim that Edward renounced William as his successor and named Harold in his place. They plan to make the king's death public after securing Morcar and Tostig's support. Fearing that Harold will have manipulated Edward, William prepares to assemble an army but lacks a fleet of ships to cross the English Channel. William negotiates with the Baron of Brittany to secure his ships, but he requests control of Normandy in return, which William refuses. Morcar agrees to support Harold on the condition that he replace Tostig as Earl of Northumbria and that Harold marry Morcar's sister Margaret to forge a lasting peace between their families. Harold reluctantly agrees and promptly marries Margaret. Edith arrives in Northumbria to find a depressed Tostig resentful of Harold for abandoning him. Having received news of Sweyn's death, Tostig warns Edith that Harold betrays everyone close to him. Edith returns to London to learn of Harold's remarriage. Believing Harold has betrayed him, Tostig allies with Hardrada. During Harold and Margaret's coronation, Harold is informed that Hardrada's forces have invaded Northumbria.
7	"Cost of War"	Erik Leijonborg	David Mar Stefansson	28 September 2025	TBA
Harold leads his army north toward York to face Hardrada's Viking forces. He encounters a defeated Morcar, who warns him that Tostig is advising Hardrada. Edith plans to flee England with her children, believing that Harold cannot survive invasions from both the north and the south. Harold's men ambush Hardrada's Vikings at Stamford Bridge. In the chaos of the battle, Harold defeats Hardrada and accidentally kills Tostig when he attempts to save his brother, during a brief return to sanity. Matilda learns that Baldwin has been undermining William by threatening the barons of Normandy with invasion. She convinces Baron Richard to expose the other traitors and spread misinformation. William realises that he cannot kill the Baron of Brittany so that his disgraced son Alain would succeed him, as it would risk war. The loyal Fitzosbern volunteers and sacrifices himself, successfully assassinating the baron, allowing Alain to bring Brittany's ships to join William's forces. To prevent Baldwin from invading during William's absence, William leaves Matilda to rule Normandy, with Robert as his regent. As William's forces prepare to cross the Channel, the appearance of a comet is seen as an omen while Harold rushes his depleted army back south.
8	"The Hand of God"	Erik Leijonborg	Michael Robert Johnson	5 October 2025	TBA
William arrives on the shores of England and burns down several villages to draw out Harold. Baldwin warns Matilda that, should William die, he is prepared to seize Normandy. Harold returns to London, where Edith refuses to continue supporting him, and Gytha berates him for failing to protect Tostig. Harold heads to face William, who sends Odo to give Harold a chance to surrender, but he refuses. At Hastings, battle erupts as William's archers fire upon Harold's outnumbered forces, who create a shield wall in a defensible position while they await Morcar's reinforcements, but Morcar instead observes the conflict from afar. After William's army fails to break through the shield wall, he rides into battle but falls from his horse, and Odo sounds the retreat. Harold's forces ignore orders and break formation to pursue William's fleeing men, but William counterattacks, and both Alain and Thomas are killed. Harold and William then clash on the battlefield, and although Harold gains the upper hand, he hesitates and is killed by William's men. William sticks an arrow through Harold's eye, leading Odo to claim that it was God's arrow that struck Harold down. In the aftermath, Matilda rejoices at the news of William's victory. Edith finds a warrant signed by Harold, which would allow her to safely leave the country. After William has Edith identify her husband's body, she and her children depart England with Gytha, Gunhild, and Margaret. William is then crowned King of England.

== Production ==
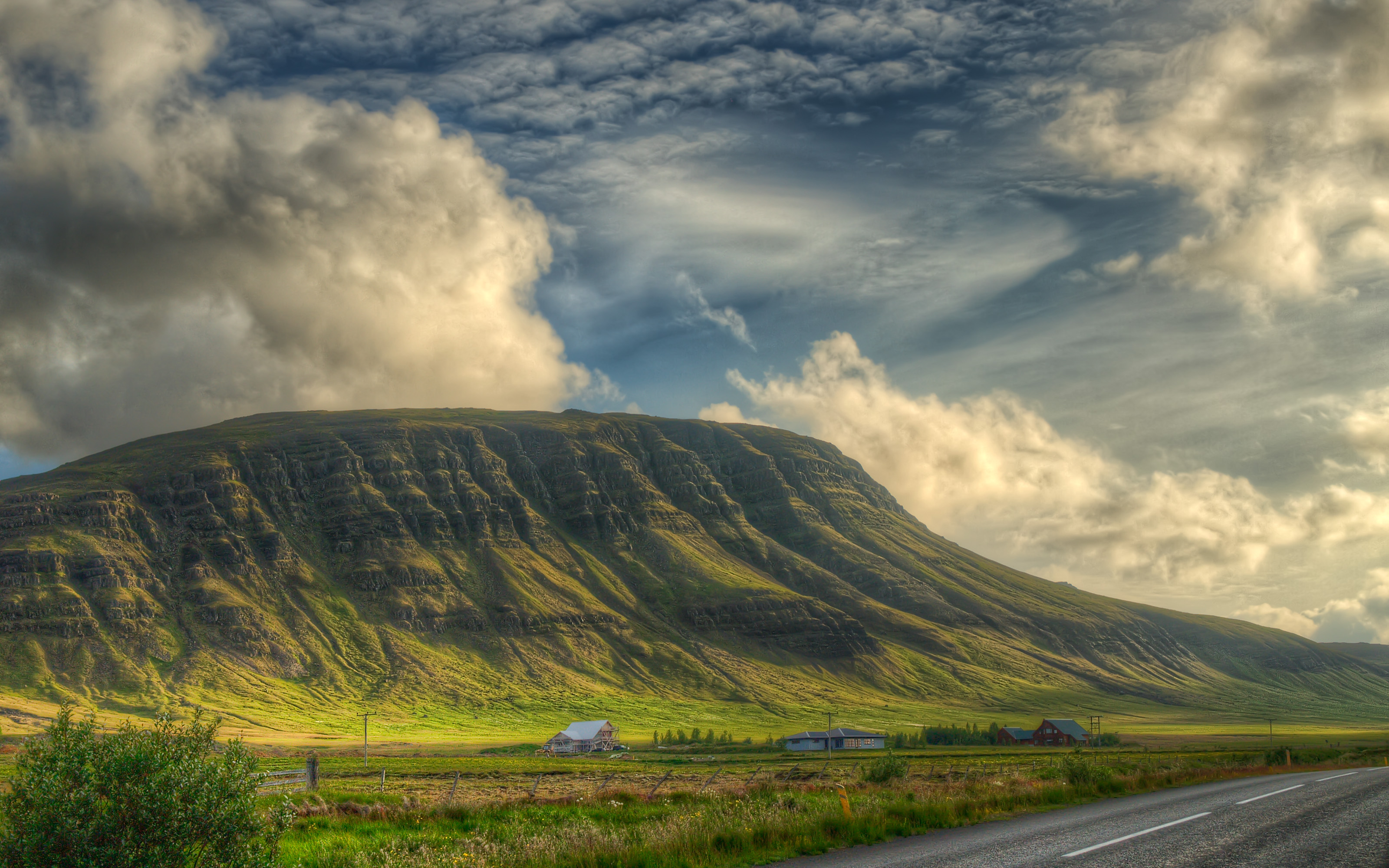
Filming took place in Iceland, including at Hvalfjörður.

In November 2023, Nikolaj Coster-Waldau was announced to portray William, Duke of Normandy. Norton initially wanted to play William, but due to contract restrictions from his role in HBO's The Nevers, he took the part of Harold, as HBO only permitted him to take on a character written to die. In March 2024, Clémence Poésy and Emily Beecham joined the series. Later that month, the cast was rounded out to include Eddie Marsan, Juliet Stevenson, Bo Bragason, Luther Ford, and Joseph Mawle, amongst others. In July 2024, it was announced that Ingvar Sigurdsson had taken over the role of Fitzosbern from Mawle. Further cast members were revealed, including Elander Moore, Indy Lewis, Jason Forbes, Ines Asserson, Sveinn Ólafur Gunnarsson, and Léo Legrand.

The series premiere was directed by Baltasar Kormákur. Other episodes were helmed by Erik Leijonborg, Bálint Szentgyörgyi, and Nikolas Coster-Waldau, who also served as an executive producer. James Norton was an executive producer through Rabbit Track Pictures and starred as Harold Godwinson. Other executive producers included Kormákur for RVK Studios, Robert Taylor for the Development Partnership, Dave Clarke and Richard Halliwell for Shepherd Content, Ed Clarke, Robert Jones, and CBS Studios' Lindsey Martin.

Filming began in March 2024 in Iceland, at locations that included Heiðmörk and around Reykjavík. The Battle of Hastings scenes were shot on a farm at Hvalfjörður. The stockades of the Norman castle exterior and scenes in London were filmed on sets built on the coast just outside Reykjavík. Shooting wrapped up in July 2024.

During production, Norton was injured while on set after falling from his horse.

== Broadcast ==
The series premiered on BBC One in the United Kingdom on 24 August 2025, with all episodes made available on BBC iPlayer the same day.

Paramount Global Content Distribution is handling worldwide distribution. In August 2025, Paramount announced that it had sold the series to various broadcasters, including Amazon Prime Video in the United States; HBO Max in the Nordics, Iberia, Southeast Asia, the Netherlands, Hong Kong, and Taiwan; SBS in Australia; Jiohotstar in India; Showcase and StackTV in Canada; M-Net in Africa; Streamz and BeTV in Belgium; Cosmote TV in Greece; yes and Hot in Israel; Sky in New Zealand; and LRT in Lithuania.

The series aired on SBS on Demand in Australia from 12 October 2025.

== Critical reception ==
On the review aggregator website Rotten Tomatoes, the series holds an approval rating of 58%, based on 12 reviews.

Critics of King & Conqueror addressed the depiction of the historical events of the Norman Conquest. Rebecca Nicholson of the Financial Times found the series "ambitious and earthy" but considered that it was not a convincing attempt at "dramatising a period that is so infrequently dramatised". Carol Midgley of The Times remarked on the artistic license taken by the production with various historical details, calling it "historical tosh" but "still entertaining". Writing in The Independent, Nick Hilton expressed dissatisfaction with the series' focus on fictional content and contrasted its scant portrayal of 11th-century England with the "world building" of fantasy productions. Tilly Pearce of The i Paper praised the acting of Norton and Coster-Waldau, stating that the drama's success lay in their "powerhouse performances".

== Historical accuracy ==
Bayeux Tapestry
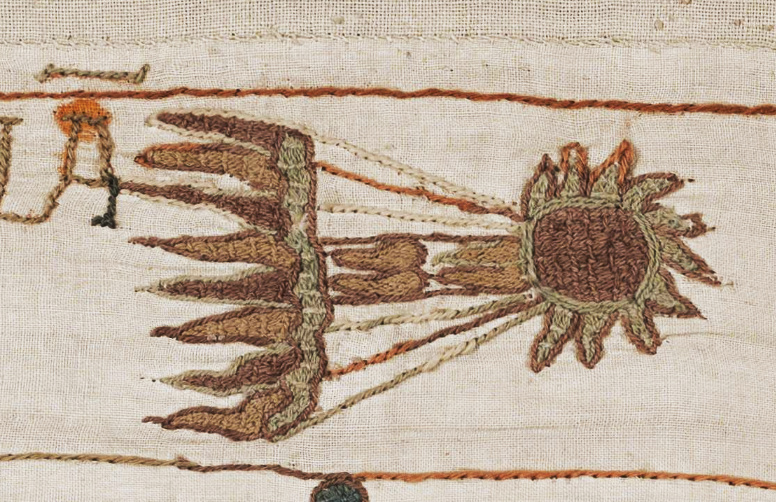
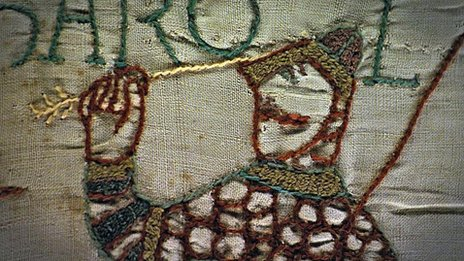
Two noted details recorded in the Bayeux Tapestry are incorporated into the drama of King & Conqueror.

Many of the characters in King & Conqueror were actual historical figures, with an additional cast of fictional characters added to the drama.

The portrayal of historical events in King & Conqueror attracted commentary from critics and historians. Discussing the series, Nikolaj Coster-Waldau described the programme as being partly fictionalised, with some characters and events created for dramatic purposes. Writing in the Radio Times, historian David Musgrove considered the blend of historical fact and fictionalised drama, remarking that the names of some characters had to be changed to avoid "too many people called the same thing" and that some important historical figures were entirely left out to support narrative pacing.

Tom Licence and other critics questioned the depiction of an apparent bromance between Harold Godwinson and William of Normandy. Actor James Norton pointed out that Harold and William had been "friends and allies for many years before they realised that, because of the way Europe was being carved up, they would both inevitably end up on a battlefield — and one of them would have to die". He also noted that the show portrays the participants of both sides in a fair light and as equals.

Writing in BBC History magazine, Kev Lochun noted numerous historical inaccuracies in the series: William of Normandy and Harold Godwinson are shown as both present at the coronation of Edward the Confessor in 1043 (their first meeting is thought to have been in 1065); Matilda of Flanders is inaccurately portrayed as a torturer; the capture of Edith the Fair by the Mercians did not take place; and Edward the Confessor did not beat his mother to death with his crown, but confiscated her assets and sent her to live in Winchester. Lochun also considers the crucial question, if Edward the Confessor named his distant cousin William of Normandy to succeed him as King of England. Lochun argues that Edward probably made the offer to William, but several years earlier in 1051. It is also considered likely that, by the time of his death, Edward favoured Edgar Ætheling as his successor, but as Lochum notes, Edgar does not appear at all in King & Conqueror. There is also no record that Harold personally killed his brother Tostig.

The appearance of Halley's Comet in the closing episodes of the series is derived from historical fact, and its presence in the sky is notably depicted in the Bayeux Tapestry. Another well-known detail from the Bayeux Tapestry is the apparent death of King Harold with an arrow in his eye. This popular understanding has more recently been questioned by scholars, but King & Conqueror works the myth into the closing scenes as an addition to Harold's corpse by William.

The script of King & Conqueror attracted some critical commentary for its use of "modern language and phrases".

The racially diverse cast was also noted by critics. Craig Simpson of The Daily Telegraph wrote that the BBC had adopted colour-blind casting for King & Conqueror, with Black actors such as Jason Forbes playing the fictional character Thane Thomas and Elander Moore playing the Mercian Morcar, commenting that England was "ethnically homogeneous" in 1066. The casting was also criticised by historical scholars Zareer Masani and David Abulafia.

The character of Sweyn Godwinson (elder brother to Harold Godwinson) is introduced engaging in jus primae noctis ("the right of the first night"), in which he forces himself upon a local girl on her wedding night. This scene is a historical myth and a manufactured trope, similar to its depiction in films such as Braveheart. There is no evidence that jus primae noctis—a supposed legal right for a lord to sleep with a bride on her wedding night—ever existed in the Middle Ages.

== See also ==
- Cultural depictions of Harold Godwinson
- Cultural depictions of William the Conqueror
- Battle of Hastings reenactment
