= Ilmur Kristjánsdóttir =

Icelandic actress, screenwriter and politician

- Born: March 19, 1978 (age 47); Reykjavík, Iceland
- Occupations: Actress; television presenter
- Years active: 2003–present
- Known for: Trapped

Ilmur Kristjánsdóttir (born 19 March 1978) is an Icelandic actress, screenwriter and politician. She is known for her role as Hinrika in the Icelandic TV series Trapped.

== Early life ==
Ilmur was born in Reykjavík, Iceland in 1978 to parents Margrét Sigurðardóttir and Kristján Guðmundsson, a high school teacher. She has two siblings, Lísa, born 1974, a filmmaker, and Sverrir, born 1980, a film editor.

She graduated from Menntaskólinn við Hamrahlíð in 1998. She then graduated from the acting division of the Icelandic Academy of the Arts in 2003.

== Personal life ==
Ilmur is in a relationship with Magnús Viðar Sigurðsson, director of RVK Studios. The couple have one son, born on New Year's Day 2014. Ilmur also has a daughter from a previous relationship, born in 2006.

In 2014 Ilmur represented the Bright Future party as a candidate in the Reykjavik City Mayor election. She was voted in as chair of the welfare committee in 2015.

Ilmur is a supporter of UNICEF Iceland and once traveled to Mozambique with the organisation.

== Filmography ==
- Dís (2004) as Blær
- Stelpurnar (TV-series) (2005) in various roles
- Áramótaskaupið 2006
- Áramótaskaupið 2007
- Brúðguminn (2008) as Matthildur
- Stóra Planið (2008) as Júlía
- Ástríður (TV-series) (2009) as Ástríður (also credited as writer and creator)
- Algjör Sveppi og leitin að Villa (2009) as Cute Girl
- Reyndu aftur (Short) (2010) as Tinna
- Ófeigur gengur aftur (2013) as Anna Sól
- Fúsi (2015) as Sjöfn
- Ófærð (2015) as Hinrika
