= Björn Thors =

Icelandic actor (born 1978)

- Born: 12 January 1978 (age 48); Reykjavík, Iceland
- Occupation: Actor
- Spouse: Unnur Ösp Stefánsdóttir
- Children: 4

Björn Thors (born 12 January 1978) is an Icelandic actor. He is known for his role as Kenneth Máni in Fangavaktin, Hugo Estevez in Sjáumst með Silvíu Nótt and Darri in Katla.

== Personal life ==
Björn is married to actress Unnur Ösp Stefánsdóttir.

== Selected filmography ==
- Sjáumst með Silvíu Nótt (2005)
- Fangavaktin (2009)
- The Deep (2012)
- Frost (2012)
- Pressa (2012)
- Paris of the North (2014)
- Fangar (2017)
- Woman at War (2018)
- The Valhalla Murders (2019-2020)
- Katla (2021) as Darri
- A Letter from Helga (2022)
- The Danish Woman (2026)
