= The Deep (2012 film) =

2012 film

- Theatrical release poster
- Directed by: Baltasar Kormákur
- Written by: Jón Atli Jónasson; Baltasar Kormákur
- Produced by: Agnes Johansen; Baltasar Kormákur
- Starring: Ólafur Darri Ólafsson
- Cinematography: Bergsteinn Björgúlfsson; Einar Magnus Magnusson (Note: Underwater scenes only.)
- Edited by: Sverrir Kristjánsson; Elísabet Ronaldsdóttir
- Music by: Daníel Bjarnason; Ben Frost
- Release date: 21 September 2012
- Running time: 95 minutes
- Country: Iceland
- Language: Icelandic

The Deep (Icelandic: Djúpið) is a 2012 Icelandic drama film directed by Baltasar Kormákur, who co-wrote the screenplay with Jón Atli Jónasson. It stars Ólafur Darri Ólafsson as a fictionalised version of Guðlaugur Friðþórsson, a fisherman who became known in 1984 for surviving six hours in freezing waters after his boat capsized off the south coast of Iceland.

== Plot ==
In March 1984, Gulli hires a new cook and then sets out to sea with four other fishermen on the boat BREKI. After poor fishing and a net snag, the boat capsizes quickly—no distress call is sent. One crew member dies from a head injury, another drowns. Gulli tries to save his friend Palli, but he dies soon. The captain also drowns, leaving Gulli alone.

Gulli sheds his heavy clothes and swims for six hours in 5°C water and –3°C air, talking to seagulls. He reaches Heimaey but must climb over a lava field and drink from an ice-water tub. After two more hours, he reaches a village and is hospitalized with a body temperature below 33°C, surviving without major injuries. Search parties find the boat but no other survivors.

Gulli becomes a national hero. A scientist examines him and finds special enzymes in his fat, allowing him to regulate body temperature seven times longer than average—comparable to seals. Still, his cold-resistant brain activity remains unexplained. Gulli ends the tests, returns to Iceland, cares for his friend Palli’s family, and later resumes fishing. The film ends with clips of a 1984 interview with the real Gulli.

== Cast ==
- Ólafur Darri Ólafsson as Gulli
- Jóhann G. Jóhannsson as Palli
- Þorbjörg Helga Þorgilsdóttir as Halla
- Theódór Júlíusson as Gulli's Father
- María Sigurðardóttir as Gulli's Mother
- Björn Thors as Hannes
- Þröstur Leó Gunnarsson as Lárus
- Guðjón Pedersen as Erlingur
- Walter Grímsson as Raggi
- Stefán Hallur Stefánsson as Jón

== Reception ==
On review aggregator website Rotten Tomatoes, the film holds a 94% approval rating, based on 31 reviews with an average rating of 6.6/10. Peter Bradshaw of The Guardian wrote that "the mystery of an Icelandic man who survived icy seas for six hours makes for an intriguing drama".

The film was selected as the Icelandic entry for the Best Foreign Language Oscar at the 85th Academy Awards, making the January shortlist. It was also nominated for the 2013 Nordic Council Film Prize.

== See also ==
- List of submissions to the 85th Academy Awards for Best Foreign Language Film
- List of Icelandic submissions for the Academy Award for Best Foreign Language Film
- Survival film, with a list of related films
