= GDRN =

Icelandic singer (born 1996)

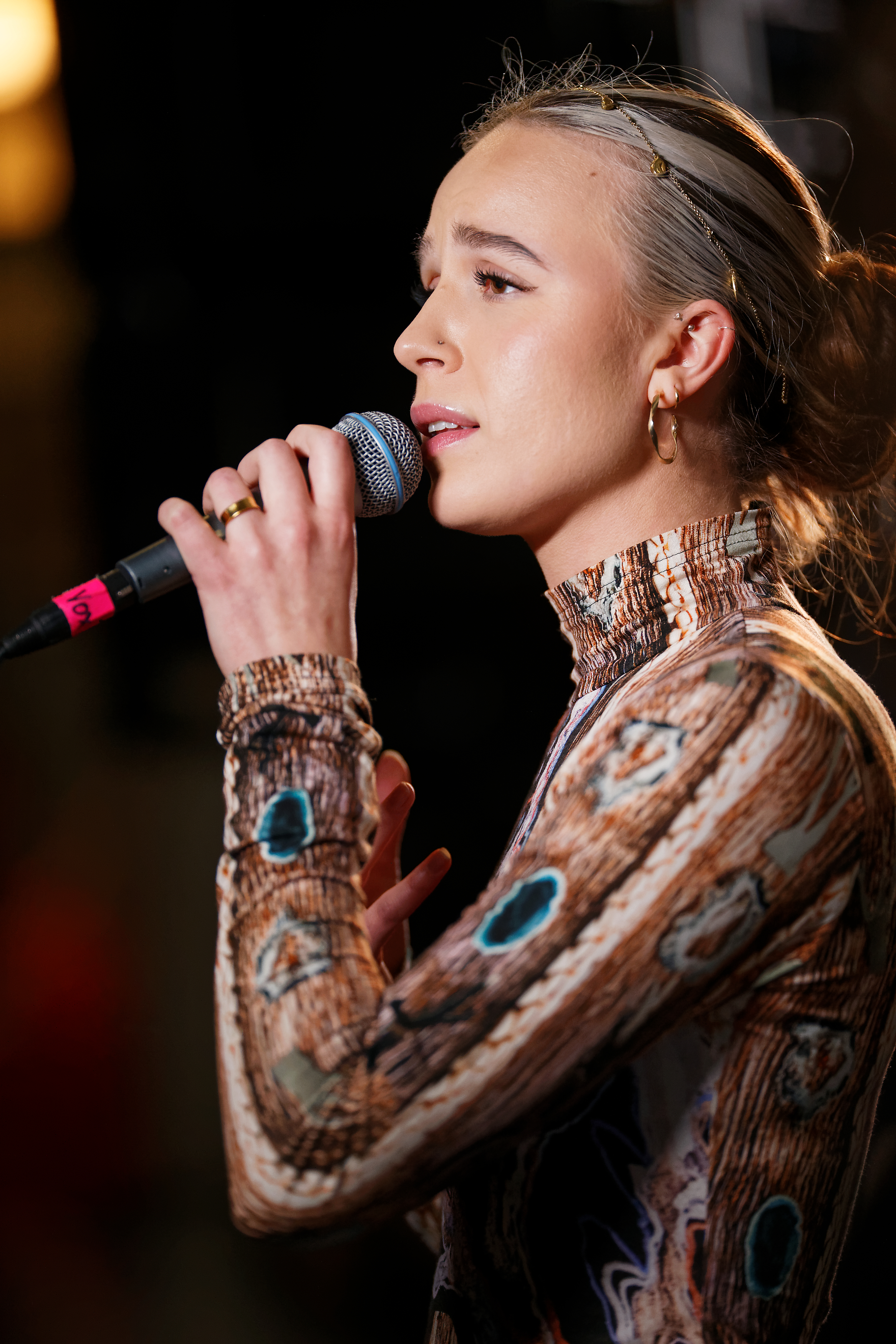
- GDRN in 2019
- Born: 8 January 1996 (age 30); Reykjavík, Iceland
- Occupations: Singer; songwriter; actress; composer
- Years active: 2017–present
Association football career
- Position: Forward
Youth career
- 2001–2014: Afturelding
Senior career*
Years	Team	Apps	(Gls)
2011–2014	Afturelding	7	(0)
- * Club domestic league appearances and goals

Guðrún Ýr Eyfjörð Jóhannesdóttir (born 8 January 1996), known by the stage name GDRN, (Note: Derived from the transliteration of her name, "Gudrun".) is an Icelandic singer and actress. Much of her music is jazz-influenced pop. She won four awards at the 2018 Icelandic Music Awards (including as pop singer of the year) and was nominated for the 2018 Nordic Music Prize.

== Biography ==
=== Early life ===
Born in Reykjavík, Guðrún moved to Mosfellsbær at the age of four.

=== Football career ===
Guðrún started playing football with Afturelding junior teams at the age of five. She had her first taste with the senior team in July 2011, at the age of 15, when she was an unused substitute in match against Þróttur Reykjavík in the Icelandic top-tier Úrvalsdeild kvenna. She suffered a cruciate ligament tear in 2011 and a meniscus tear in 2012 and while she managed to play 7 matches in the Úrvalsdeild the following seasons, the injuries effectively ended her career following the 2014 season. In April 2022, she signed a 3-year deal to become one of Afturelding women's team primary sponsors.

=== Music career ===
She studied classical violin for 11 years, and later jazz piano and singing. She went to Reykjavík Junior College with the intention of becoming a medical doctor, but began making music in her last year of junior college which she would then focus on after graduation.

She writes her own lyrics, and co-produces her music with Teitur Helgi Skúlason and Bjarki Sigurðsson or her first album, and with Arnar Ingi Ingason and Magnús Jóhann Ragnarsson on her second.

Her first hit song was "Lætur mig" from 2018. Guðrún headlined at the 2019 Þjóðhátíð and was chosen as Mosfellsbær's artist of 2019. She is a featured vocalist on the song, Midnight Moon, which appears on Icelandic pianist and composer, Eydís Evensen's 2021 debut alum, Bylur. The song was recorded in Iceland in 2020. A 2021 live concert (filmed in Iceland due to COVID-19 travel restrictions) for the Seattle-based radio station, KEXP, which included Midnight Moon, received over 4 million views on YouTube.

=== Acting career ===
In 2019, she was a part of the music cast of the National Theatre of Iceland's production of Shakespeare in Love. In 2020, it was announced that she had been cast as a member of Netflix's Icelandic original series Katla, directed by Baltasar Kormákur. Although she did not formally train as an actress, she was invited to audition for the series by Kormákur who casting for the show. She plays the character of Gríma in the series. The series was filmed in Iceland beginning in February 2020 and featured a small cast and crew due to COVID-19 restrictions.

A Christmas album called Nokkur jólaleg lög, recorded with Magnús Jóhann, was released on 22 November 2024 for vinyl and streaming.

=== Personal life ===
She and her boyfriend, doctor and former handball player, Árni Steinn Steinþórsson, are parents to a son who was born in July 2022.

== Albums ==
- Hvað ef (2018)
- GDRN (2020)
- Tíu íslensk sönglög (with Magnús Jóhann) (2022)
- Frá mér til þín (2024)
- Nokkur jólaleg lög (2024)

== Awards and nominations ==
Year	Award	Prize	Recipient	Result		
2017	Icelandic Music Awards	Newcomer of the year	Herself	Nominated		
2017	2018	Icelandic Music Awards	Songwriter of the year	Herself	Nominated	
2017	2018	Icelandic Music Awards	Lyricist of the year	Herself	Nominated	
2017	2018	Icelandic Music Awards	Pop singer of the year	Herself	Won	
2017	2018	Icelandic Music Awards	Pop single of the year	"Lætur mig"	Won	
2017	2018	Icelandic Music Awards	Music video of the year	"Lætur mig"	Won	
Icelandic Music Awards	2018	Pop album of the year	Hvað ef	Won		
Nordic Music Prize	2018	Pop album of the year	Hvað ef	Nominated		
Reykjavík Grapevine Awards	2018	Album of the year	Hvað ef	Won		
Kraumsverðlaunin Awards	2018	Album	Hvað ef	Won		
2019	Artist of Mosfellsbær	Artist of the year	Herself	Won		
2019	2020	The Icelandic Audience Awards	Singer of the year	Herself	Won	
2019	2020	The Icelandic Audience Awards	Performer of the year	Herself	Nominated	
2019	2020	2021	The Icelandic Audience Awards	Pop performer of the year	Herself	Nominated
2019	2020	2021	The Icelandic Audience Awards	Singer of the year	Herself	Nominated
2019	2020	2021	The Icelandic Audience Awards	Album of the year	GDRN	Nominated
Icelandic Music Awards	2020	2021	Pop singer of the year	Herself	Nominated	
Icelandic Music Awards	Album of the year	2021	GDRN	Nominated		
Icelandic Music Awards	Songwriter of the year	2021	Herself	Nominated		
Icelandic Music Awards	Song of the year	2021	"Vorið"	Nominated		
2022	The Icelandic Audience Awards	Singer of the year	Herself	Won		
2022	The Icelandic Audience Awards	Song of the year	Ef ástin er hrein	Won		
2022	Icelandic Music Awards	Pop singer of the year	Herself	Nominated		
2022	2023	Icelandic Music Awards	Song of the year	Upp á rönd	Nominated	
2022	2023	The Icelandic Audience Awards	Song of the year	Upp á rönd	Nominated	
2022	2023	The Icelandic Audience Awards	Album of the year	Tíu íslensk sönglög	Nominated	
The Icelandic Audience Awards	2023	Singer of the year	Herself	Nominated		
The Icelandic Audience Awards	2023	Performer of the year	Herself	Nominated		
2024	2023	Icelandic Music Awards	Performer of the year	Herself	Nominated	
2024	Icelandic Music Awards	Singer of the year	Herself	Nominated		
2024	Icelandic Music Awards	Album of the year	Frá mér til þín	Nominated		
2024	Icelandic Music Awards	People's choice	Herself	Nominated		
2024	Icelandic Music Awards	Graphic design	Nokkur jólaleg lög	Won silver prize		
2024	The Icelandic Audience Awards	Song of the year	Háspenna	Nominated		
2024	The Icelandic Audience Awards	Album of the year	Frá mér til þín	Nominated		
2024	The Icelandic Audience Awards	Singer of the year	Herself	Nominated		
2024	The Icelandic Audience Awards	Performer of the year	Herself	Nominated		
2025	Icelandic Music Awards	Music video of the year	Það sem jólin snúast um	Won		
2025	The Icelandic Audience Awards	Singer of the year	Herself	Nominated		
2025	The Icelandic Audience Awards	Song of the year	Blágræn	Nominated		

== Discography ==
=== Studio albums ===
List of albums, with selected chart positions, sales figures and certifications
Title	Album details	Peak chart positions								Certifications
Title	Album details	ICL								Certifications
Hvað ef	Released: 17 August 2018; Language: Icelandic; Label: Alda Music	17	—	—	—	-	—	—	—	ISL: Platinum
GDRN	Released: 21 February 2020; Language: Icelandic; Label: GDRN - Exclusively distributed by Sony Music Entertainment Denmark A/S	9	-	-	-	—	-	-	-	ISL: Gold
Tíu íslensk sönglög	Released: 16 September 2022; Language: Icelandic; Label: GDRN & Magnús Jóhann - Exclusively distributed by Sony Music Entertainment Denmark A/S	5	-	-	-	—	-	-	—	ISL: Platinum
Frá mér til þín	Released: 22 March 2024; Language: Icelandic; Label: GDRN	85	-	-	—	—	-	—	—	
Nokkur jólaleg lög	Released: 22 November 2024; Language: Icelandic; Label: GDRN & Magnús Jóhann - Exclusively distributed by Alda Music	19	—	—	—	—	—	—	—	ISL: Gold

=== Songs with peak chart positions ===
List of songs, with selected peak chart positions
Title	Year	Peak chart positions				Album
Title	Year	ICL				Album
"Lætur mig"*	2019	86	—	—	—	Hvað ef
"Næsta"*	2019	71	—	—	—	Non album single
"Af og til"*	2020	95	—	—	—	GDRN
"Ef ástin er hrein"*	2021	1	—	—	—	Lengi lifum við
"Parísarhjól"*	2023	61	—	—	—	Frá mér til þín
"Háspenna"*	2024	66	—	—	—	Frá mér til þín

* denotes Iceland-only releases. All positions are on Tónlist, an unofficial Icelandic Singles Chart, but are indicative of relevant popularity and chart success

== Filmography ==
Year	Title	Role
2021	Flýg Upp x Varlega	
2021	Katla	Gríma
2022	Fire & Iceland	Herself
