= Off Limits (2018 film) =

2018 film by Gregor Erler

The Last Berliner
- Directed by: Gregor Erler
- Screenplay by: Gregor Erler; Benjamin Karalic
- Produced by: Gregor Erler; Matthias Ziesing; Christopher Cornelsen
- Starring: Matthias Ziesing; Pegah Ferydoni; Moritz Heidelbach; Wolfgang Packhäuser
- Music by: Rutger Hoedemaekers
- Production companies: Koenigsgarten UG; film13 GbR; Cornelsen Films GmbH
- Release date: 24 October 2018 (Hof International Film Festival)
- Running time: 97 minutes
- Country: Germany
- Language: German

Off Limits or The Last Berliner (Der letzte Mieter) is a 2018 German hostage drama film set in contemporary Berlin. It won the award for the Best Feature Film at the 5th Manchester International Festival in July 2019.

== Plot ==
A housing company evicts its tenants, intending to turn their homes into luxury apartments. Dietmar Heine, an ailing pensioner living in an old flat in former East Berlin, is unwilling to comply. The day he is supposed to leave, his son Tobias returns home to find Dietmar quarrelling with their landlord. The argument escalates, Dietmar shoots himself, and an angry Tobias takes the landlord and a police officer hostage. The film follows the three of them, as Tobias tries to stop the evictions, and the police try to save the hostages.

== Critical reception ==
Marie O'Sullivan, for The Movie Isle, called The Last Berliner a 'surprising gem' that 'manages to be funny, tense, sad and sympathetic at the same time'.
