= Without Blood =

War drama film by Angelina Jolie

- Theatrical release poster
- Directed by: Angelina Jolie
- Screenplay by: Angelina Jolie
- Based on: Without Blood by Alessandro Baricco
- Produced by: Lorenzo De Maio; Angelina Jolie
- Starring: Salma Hayek; Demián Bichir
- Cinematography: Seamus McGarvey
- Edited by: Xavier Box
- Music by: Rutger Hoedemaekers
- Production companies: De Maio Entertainment; Jolie Productions; Pistachio Pictures; Greenhill Productions; The Apartment Pictures
- Distributed by: Brainstorm Media (United States); Vision Distribution (Italy)
- Release dates: September 8, 2024 (TIFF); April 10, 2025 (Italy); September 18, 2026 (United States)
- Running time: 91 minutes
- Countries: United States; Italy
- Language: English

Without Blood is a 2024 war drama film written, coproduced, and directed by Angelina Jolie and based on Alessandro Baricco's book of the same name. It stars Salma Hayek, Demián Bichir, and Juan Minujín.

The film premiered in the Special Presentations section at the 2024 Toronto International Film Festival on September 8, 2024, was released in Italy on April 10, 2025, and was released in the United States on September 18, 2026.

== Premise ==
The story revolves around Nina, who survived a war only to discover that her trauma fuels her quest for revenge years later against those who hurt her.

== Cast ==
- Salma Hayek as Nina
  - Angelica Pisilli as Nina age 30
  - Karolay Fernandez as Nina age 14
- Demián Bichir as Tito
  - Ariel Perez Lima as Young Tito
  - Patricio Jose as Tito age 30
- Juan Minujín as Salinas

== Production ==
In June 2022, it was revealed that Angelina Jolie would direct and write an adaptation based on the book titled Without Blood by Alessandro Baricco. Salma Hayek, Demián Bichir, and Juan Minujín were cast in the lead roles as Nina, Tito and Salinas. Jolie's elder sons Maddox and Pax were members of the crew in the assistant director department. Principal photography began around June in Apulia and Basilicata.

== Release ==
The film premiered at the 2024 Toronto International Film Festival. The film was released in Italy on April 10, 2025. The film was released in the United States on September 18, 2026.

== Reception ==
On the review aggregator website Rotten Tomatoes, 36% of 14 critics' reviews are positive. Metacritic, which uses a weighted average, assigned the film a score of 40 out of 100, based on 7 critics, indicating "mixed or average" reviews.

IndieWire found the film mediocre, suffering from a "lack of dramatic shape" but with "good intentions", giving it a "C" grade. The Wrap called it "a film with its heart in the right place yet only a faint pulse", writing "Not only does the film's conclusion then feel quite rushed, it's hard to say that everything that preceded it was patient enough either. The story Jolie is seeking to tell in Without Blood is certainly one worth telling, it's just a shame this isn’t the film to do it successfully." Similarly, The Hollywood Reporter stated that the film "plays it safe" and "the story ultimately seems too thin to bear the weight of its themes."

Baricco praised the film, saying that he saw "the characters I had imagined come to life. It was amazing. Meeting Angelina, her talent, her courage, and her gentle strength, has been a privilege for me. The beauty of the film preserves much of what is so special about her."
