= David Mar Stefansson =

Icelandic screenwriter and producer (born 1991)

- Born: October 29, 1991 (age 34); Lund, Sweden
- Education: University of Iceland (BA) Columbia University (MFA)
- Occupation: Screenwriter · producer
- Writing career
- Years active: 2018-present

David Mar Stefansson (Icelandic: Davíð Már Stefánsson; born October 29, 1991) is an Icelandic screenwriter and producer, best known for Katla (2021) and Trapped (2022).

== Early life and education ==
Stefansson was born in Lund, Sweden, the son of sociologist Guðbjörg Linda Rafnsdóttir and economist Stefán Jóhann Stefánsson. Growing up in Reykjavík, Iceland, Stefansson attended the University of Iceland where he studied philosophy and creative writing, receiving a BA in 2015. Moving to New York City, Stefansson received an MFA in screenwriting from Columbia University in 2019.

== Career ==
Starting out as a journalist for Morgunblaðið, Stefansson wrote several short films before making his television debut with the miniseries Katla (2021) for Baltasar Kormákur and Netflix, writing four of the eight episodes. Continuing his collaboration with Baltasar Kormákur and Netflix, Stefansson also wrote for the third season of Trapped (2022). His recent projects include writing the third season of Gangs of London (2020-) for AMC+ and Sky Atlantic, as well as the historical miniseries King & Conqueror (2025) for BBC and CBS.

In addition to his writing, Stefansson has contributed to the academic field as a screenwriting lecturer at the Iceland University of the Arts, the Icelandic Film School, and Columbia University School of the Arts.

== Filmography ==
=== Television ===
Year	Title	Writer	Notes	Ref.
2021	Katla	Yes	Miniseries; 4 episodes Also story	
2022	Trapped	Yes	2 episodes	
2025	Gangs of London	Yes	1 episode	
2025	King & Conqueror	Yes	Miniseries; 2 episodes Also associate producer	

=== Film ===
Year	Title	Writer	Notes	Ref.
2018	Rabbits	Yes	Short film	
2019	Three Corner House	Yes	Short film	
2022	Man in the Morgue	Yes	Short film	
TBA	Auteur	Yes	In-Development	
