= Sólveig Arnarsdóttir =

Icelandic actress (born 1973)

- Born: 26 January 1973 (age 53); Iceland
- Occupation: Actress

Sólveig Arnarsdóttir (born 26 January 1973) is an Icelandic actress. She is known for her performances in Stella í orlofi, Let Me Fall, Trapped, and Katla.

Sólveig is the daughter of Icelandic actor Arnar Jónsson and Icelandic actress and politician Þórhildur Þorleifsdóttir. She graduated from the Ernst Busch Academy of Dramatic Arts in Berlin, Germany. She worked on stage at the Icelandic National Theatre, the Icelandic Opera, and Maxim Gorki Theatre in Berlin.

== Selected filmography ==
=== Film ===
List of film appearances, with year, title, and role shown
Year	Title	Role	Notes
1986	Stella í orlofi	Eva	
2003	September	Susanne	
2006	Nothing but Ghosts	Jonina	
2008	Heiðin	Frida	
2017	Baumschlager	Ulla Jensen	
2018	Woman at War	Mother of Sirrý	
2018	Let Me Fall	Jórunn	

=== Television ===
List of television appearances, with year, title, and role shown
Year	Title	Role	Notes
2002–06	Das Duo	Uschi Jacobs	10 episodes
2004	Tatort	Iris (geriatric nurse)	1 episode
2007–2012	Der Kommissar und das Meer	Karin Jacobsson	12 episodes
2008	Our Charly	Lena Eklund	1 episode
2008	Svartir Englar	Katrín	6 episodes
2009	Réttur	Halla	1 episode
2012	Pfarrer Braun	Bridget Murrag	1 episode
2014	Hraunið	Elín	4 episodes
2019	Trapped	Halla	10 episodes
2019	Pabbahelgar	Guðrún	3 episodes
2021	Katla	Magnea	8 episodes
