= Cultural depictions of Harold Godwinson =

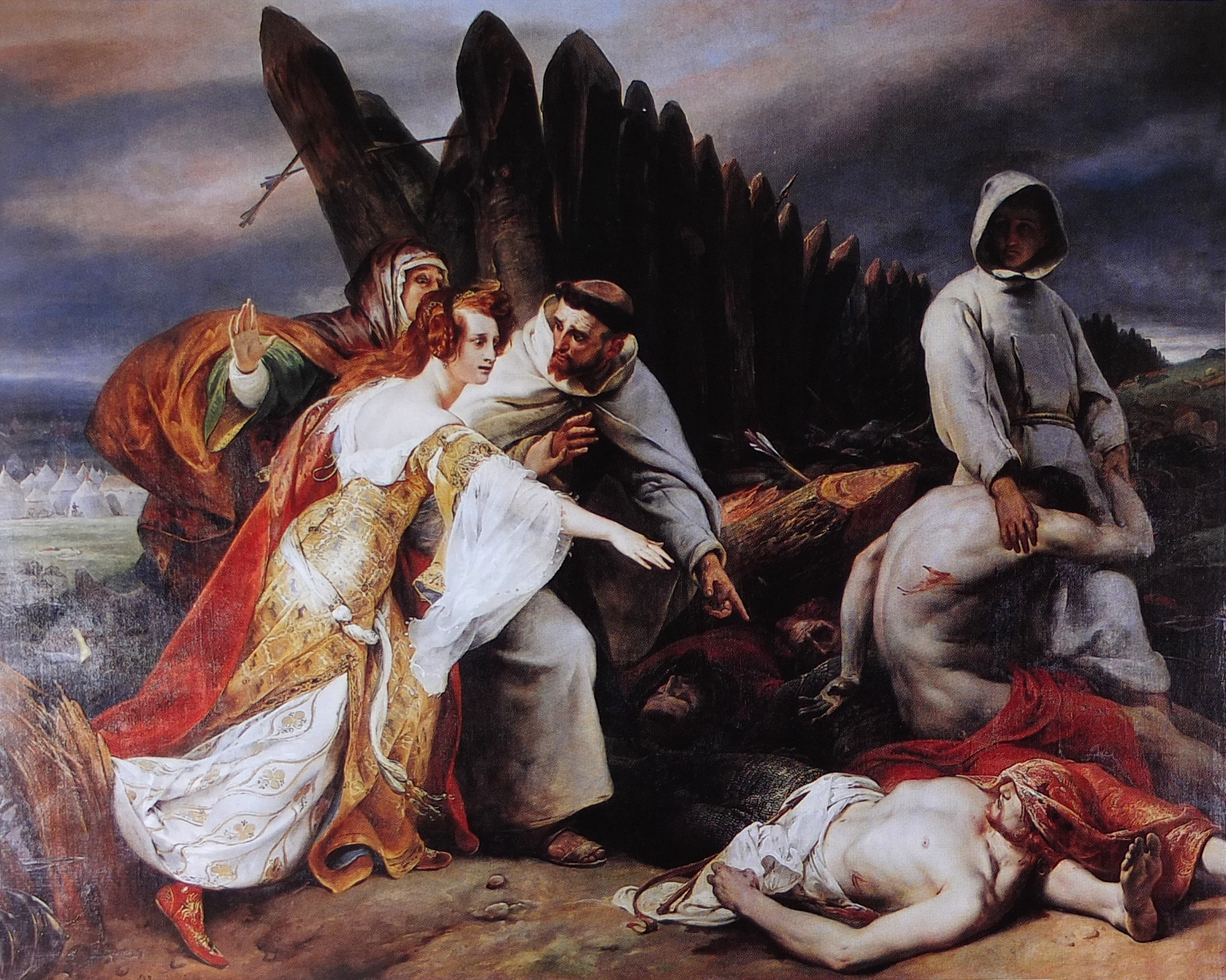
Edith Recovering Harold's Body after the Battle of Hastings (Horace Vernet, 1827)

Harold Godwinson has been depicted in a number of modern works.

== In drama, film and television ==
Plays about Harold include the 1778 play The Battle of Hastings by Richard Cumberland, and the drama Harold, by Alfred, Lord Tennyson, in 1876. The one-act play A Choice of Kings (1966) by John Mortimer deals with his deception by William after his shipwreck.

In the 1982 French/Romanian production "William the Conqueror" (aka Guillaume le Conquérant or Wilhelm Cuceritorul), directed by Sergiu Nicolaescu and Gilles Grangier, John Terry played King Harold.

Michael Craig portrayed Harold in a 1966 TV adaptation of Mortimer's A Choice of Kings in the ITV Play of the Week series.

A fictional version of Harold was played by James Norton in the 2025 BBC series King & Conqueror.

== In literature ==
Fictional depictions of Harold have appeared in literature. The 1851 poem "The Swan-Neck", by Charles Kingsley is about Harold and his wife Edith. Several novels were published in the Victorian era about Harold Godwinson. These included Harold, the Last of the Saxons (1848) by Edward Bulwer-Lytton, Wulf the Saxon: a story of the Norman Conquest (1895) by G. A. Henty, The Andreds-weald; or The House of Michelham: a Tale of the Norman Conquest (1878) by Augustine David Crake; William the Conqueror: An Historical Romance (1858) by General Charles James Napier, and In the New Forest : A Story of the reign of William the Conqueror by Herbert Strang and John Aston (1910). Rudyard Kipling wrote a short story, included in his 1910 collection, Rewards and Fairies, where an aged King Harold (who survives Hastings) meets Henry I and dies in the arms of a Saxon knight. The short story "The Eye of the Hurricane" by Kevin Crossley-Holland (in the 1969 book Wordhoard: Anglo-Saxon Stories by Crossley-Holland and Jill Paton Walsh) depicts Harold fighting in the Battle of Hastings. In the posthumously published Robert E. Howard story "The Road of Azrael" (1976), Harold survives the battle and escapes to the Middle East.

Modern novels have included The Golden Warrior (1948) by Hope Muntz, The Fourteenth of October (1952) by Bryher, Harold Was My King (1970) by Hilda Lewis, The Wind From Hastings (1978) by Morgan Llywelyn, Lord of Sunset (1998) by Parke Godwin, The Last English King by Julian Rathbone, and The Handfasted Wife (2013) by Carol McGrath. Fatal Rivalry (2017) by Mercedes Rochelle focuses on Harold's relationships with Tostig Godwinson and Edgar The Aetheling. Rite of Conquest (2003) by Judith Tarr and God's Concubine (2004) by Sara Douglass are both fantasy novels that feature Harold as a character. The Rhyme of King Harold (2014) by Ian Macgill is a verse novel about Harold's life. After Hastings (2020) by Steven H. Silver is an alternate history novel where Harold defeats Williams at Hastings, and subsequently comes into conflict with the Papacy.

== Radio ==
Christopher Eccleston played Harold in the 2001 radio play Bayeux by Simon Armitage and Jeff Young, based on the Bayeux Tapestry.
