= Eydís Evensen =

Icelandic composer and pianist

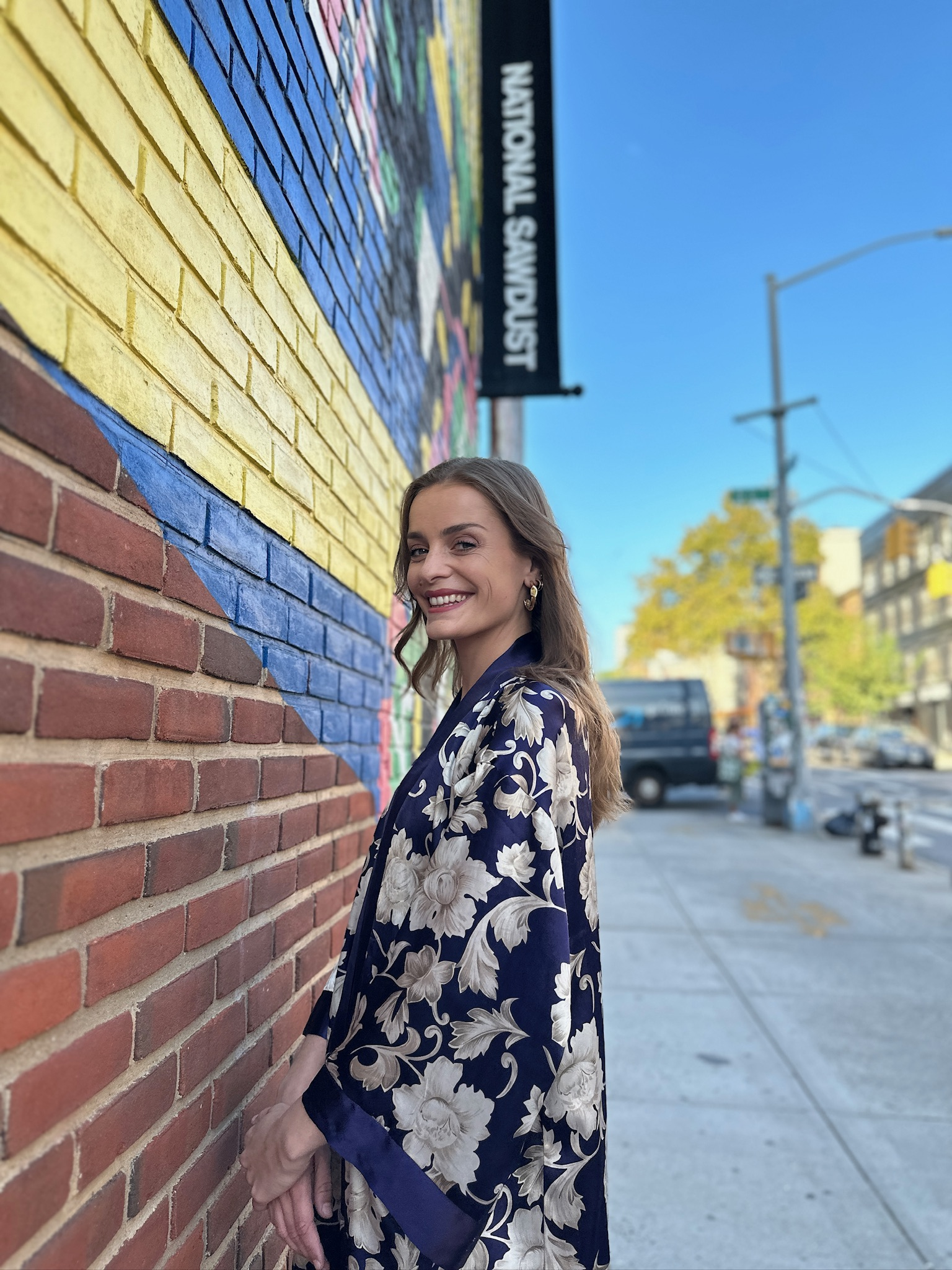
- Evensen in 2023
- Born: 5 February 1994 (age 31); Blönduós, Iceland
- Occupations: Composer; Pianist; Singer
- Years active: 2018–present
- Partner: Einar Egils (2021-present)
- Musical career
- Genres: Post classical
- Instruments: Piano; Vocals
- Labels: XXIM Records (Sony Masterworks)
- Website: www.eydis-evensen.com

Eydís Helena Evensen (born 5 February 1994), is an Icelandic composer, pianist, vocalist, and former model. Her 2021 debut album, Bylur, charted at #23 on the UK Classical Artist Albums Chart and she was listed on The Line of Best Fit's 2021 Artists on the Rise as well as on Classic FM's 30 under 30 stars on the Rise list.

Evensen has performed at The Royal Albert Hall, SXSW, the Nobel Prize Museum, and the ESNS Festival, among others, and has been a twice-featured performer on KEXP.

== Early life and education ==
Eydís Evensen was born in Blönduós, Iceland. She began taking flute lessons at five years of age and then moved onto piano lessons when she was six years old. To cope with the harsh Icelandic winters, Evensen and her four older siblings practiced musical instruments and listened to their parents' record collection, which included jazz and Led Zeppelin. She recorded her first album, of six songs she composed, when she was thirteen years old at her local school. The album was funded by her parents and was not commercially released. Instead, Evensen sold the CDs door-to-door, with profits going a local children's charity called ABC.

As a teenager, Evensen played professional volleyball but sustained a serious knee injury which led her to focus solely on her music education. After graduating from Reykjavík College of Music, she was accepted into the Royal Academy of Arts in London, where she continued her studies in classical music and composition.

== Career ==
=== Music ===
Evensen is a classically trained pianist and post-classical composer. Her music has been described as blended elements of classical music with contemporary and ambient sounds. She composes music for string instruments, brass, woodwind and vocals, as well. Among her musical influences are classical composers such as Frédéric Chopin, Claude Debussy, and Ólafur Arnalds, and contemporary artists such as Philip Glass, Sigur Rós and Björk.

Her debut performance at Iceland Airwaves Festival in 2018 caught the attention of Sony Masterworks, and she was signed to the label in November 2019. Evensen's album, Bylur, charted at #23 on the UK Classical Artist Albums Chart in 2021 and her album, The Light, peaked at #5 on the UK Specialist Classical Chart in 2023. She sold out her first headline show in the Elgar Room at London's Royal Albert Hall and her 2021 "Live On KEXP At Home" performance is one of the most viewed sessions in KEXP history, with 5 million YouTube streams in 2024.

The Line of Best Fit wrote, "Evensen is hugely influenced by nature, her post-classical compositions have grown into works that are immersive, delicate and intensely emotive…she’s able to mould them into a sonic journey that’ll stick with you long after the last note is played" and Wonderland Magazine said, "Few artists are so effortlessly able to twist your heartstrings into a contortion of joy, sorrow and despair like Eydís Evensen”.

Evensen's third studio album, Oceanic Mirror, is scheduled for release on 10 October 2025. The album's debut single, Helena's Sunrise, was released on 9 June 2025. It was written for Evensen's niece and its accompanying music video was filmed in Portugal. The album's second single, Eternal, was released on 27 June 2025.

=== Modeling ===
Evensen worked as a model while she was living in New York in her early 20s, represented by Elite Model Management. She has modeled for clothing lines such as Urban Outfitters and has been featured in the fashion magazine, Schön!, among others. In 2013, she was a runway model on Season 1 of New York Fashion Week (Fall Winter/2013), which aired on Fashion News Live on 23 June 2016. Evensen later stated in a 2020 interview that she did not like the industry's emphasis on body image or the competitive nature required to book jobs.

== Discography ==
Year	Title	Format	Notes
2021	Bylur	LP, CD, Streaming	Debut studio album
2022	Frost	Streaming	EP
2022	some kind of peace piano reworks	Streaming	Album by Ólafur Arnalds; Featured artist on the song, "Loom"
2023	The Light	LP, CD, Streaming	Second studio album
2025	Oceanic Mirror	Streaming	Third studio album

=== Music Videos ===
- Brotin (2021)
- Wandering II (2021)
- Dagdrumur (2021)
- Midnight Moon (featuring GDRN)
- Bylur (2021)
- Fyrir Mikael (2021)
- Dawn is Near (2022)
- Tephra Horizon (2023)
- Anna's Theme (2023)
- Tranquillant (2023)
- Dreaming of Light (2023)
- Helena's Sunrise (2025)
- Dimmuborgir ft. Ásgeir (2025)

== Personal life ==
Evensen lived in New York City for five years while working as a model. She moved back to Iceland, settling in Reykjavik, in 2020 due to the mandatory COVID-19 lockdowns in New York. She originally intended to return to New York City to continue modelling but due to travel restrictions caused by the COVID-19 pandemic, she quit modelling and instead recorded material for her debut studio album.

She has written poetry since she was 14 years old, which she considers private and is reluctant to share publicly. Two compositions (The Light II and Dreaming of Light), which appeared on her second studio album, The Light, include lyrics inspired by her poetry. Her romantic partner and frequent collaborator of several years is Icelandic film director, Einar Egils, whom she lives with in Reykjavik. Eydís’ brother, Gústaf Evensen, is the former guitarist of the metal band, Svartidauði (2017–2022).

Evensen enjoys watercolour painting in her spare time. She has four older brothers and sisters. She attended Hamrahlíð College in Reykjavik, where she sang in the choir as a teenager. Evensen is a vegan. Her mother is a surgical nurse; Evensen showed an interest in biology and mathematics for an early age, intending to become a surgeon, if she had not pursued a career in music. She is a fan of Radiohead and fellow Icelandic composer, Hildur Guðnadóttir.
