= Unnur Ösp Stefánsdóttir =

Icelandic director and actress

- Born: 6 April 1976 (age 50)
- Education: Iceland University of the Arts
- Occupations: Director, actress and screenwriter
- Years active: 2002–present
- Spouse: Björn Thors
- Children: 4

Unnur Ösp Stefánsdóttir is an Icelandic director, actress and screenwriter. A veteran stage actor and director, she his also known for her appearances in the TV series Trapped, The Minister and Blackport.

== Personal life ==
Unnur is married to actor Björn Thors. Together they have four children.

== Selected filmography ==
- Marteinn (2009)
- Réttur (2010)
- Fangar (2017) as Brynja
- Trapped (2018–2019) as Elín
- The Minister (2020) as Katla
- Blackport (2021) as Freydís
