= Íris Tanja Flygenring =

Icelandic actress (born 1996)

- Born: 12 November 1989 (age 37); Iceland
- Education: Iceland University of the Arts
- Occupation: Actress
- Years active: 2016–present

Íris Tanja Ívars Flygenring (born 12 November 1989) is an Icelandic actress. She is best known for her performance as Ása in the Netflix TV series Katla. She graduated from the Iceland University of the Arts in 2016. In 2021, she appeared as one of the main characters the third season of Trapped. She performed with the band Hatari as a dancer in 2022.

== Personal life ==
Íris is the daughter of actor Valdimar Örn Flygenring. She has a son, born in 2010 and a daughter, born in 2017. She is engaged to Elín Eyþórsdóttir, one of the band members from Systur, a folk music band consisting of three sisters.

== Filmography ==
Year	Title	Role
2017	Fangar	Vera
2020	Iceland is best	Fenella
2021	Katla	Ása
2021	Trapped	Freyja
