= Rúnar Freyr Gíslason =

Icelandic actor and voice actor (born 1973)

- Born: 29 April 1973 (age 53); Iceland
- Occupations: Actor; voice actor; singer; radio host
- Years active: 1999–present
- Spouse: Selma Björnsdóttir (m. 2005; div. 2010)
- Partner: Guðrún Jóna Stefánsdóttir (2011–present)
- Children: 4

Rúnar Freyr Gíslason (born 29 April 1973) is an Icelandic actor, voice actor and singer. He hosts a radio show with TV-personality Logi Bergmann Eiðsson and with Friðrika Hjördís Geirsdóttir called Ísland vaknar (English: Iceland wakes up). He is known for his role as Sigvaldi in the TV-series Trapped.

== Career ==
Rúnar graduated from the Icelandic Theater School in 1999. After graduation he was involved in numerous productions on stage at the National Theater of Iceland and others. These include Romeo and Juliet, Woyzeck, Singin' in the Rain, Who's Afraid of Virginia Woolf, Rent and Sound of Music.

Rúnar is also a director. His productions include the Icelandic version of the musical Hair in 2004.

He was the original voice and Icelandic dubber for Pixel in LazyTown, and he provided the Icelandic voice dubbing role to Naveen in the Disney film, The Princess and the Frog.

== Personal life ==
Rúnar was married to Icelandic singer and actress Selma Björnsdóttir from 2005 until 2010. The couple had met when they played together in the Icelandic adaptation of the musical Grease. The couple had two children together before divorcing in 2010.

Rúnar has been in a relationship with gymnastic instructor Guðrún Jóna Stefánsdóttir since 2011. They couple welcomed their first child in April 2015. Rúnar has one other child from a previous relationship.

Rúnar is a recovering alcoholic. He said this in a 2014 interview: "When I came put of rehab two and a half years ago I didn't feel good. I felt as I had lost at life. I was an alcoholic with three tries at rehab in that same year. I felt hopeless. I felt alone and abandoned. The future did not look good. But then I came out into the real world and discovered that this was all wrong. I still had my education, my talents, and most important I had a great family, friends and coworkers that stood by me. They helped me a great deal in my recovery. I never had to suffer alone. There was always someone there and that was and is incredibly valuable to me."

== Filmography ==
- Einkalíf (1995) as Margrét's lover
- Glanni Glæpur í Latabæ (1999) as Goggi Mega
- Villiljós (2001) as Totti
- Áramótaskaup 2001 (2001) various roles
- Ørnen: En krimi-odyssé (TV-series) (2006) as Lebedev
- The Silvia Night Show (TV-series) (2007) as Pepe Luigi Romano
- Áramótaskaup 2007 (2007) various roles
- Sveitabrúðkaup (2008) as Sigurður Atli
- Ástríður (TV-series) (2009) as Sveinn Torfi
- Fangavaktin (TV-series) (2009) as Tryggvi Breiðfjörð
- Hamarinn (TV-series) (2009) as Orri
- Kóngavegur (2010) as Steri
- Existence (Short) (2010) as Daníel
- Réttur (TV-series) (2015) as Davíð
- Ófærð (TV-series) (2015-2016) as Sigvaldi
