= Trapped (Icelandic TV series) =

Icelandic TV mystery drama series

- Also known as: Ófærð
- Genre: Mystery; Thriller; Nordic noir
- Created by: Baltasar Kormákur
- Developed by: Baltasar Kormákur; Sigurjón Kjartansson
- Written by: Sigurjón Kjartansson; Clive Bradley
- Directed by: Baltasar Kormákur; Baldvin Zophoníasson; Börkur Sigthorsson; Óskar Thor Axelsson
- Starring: Ólafur Darri Ólafsson; Ilmur Kristjánsdóttir; Ingvar Eggert Sigurðsson; Nína Dögg Filippusdóttir; Bjarne Henriksen; Björn Hlynur Haraldsson
- Composers: Jóhann Jóhannsson; Hildur Guðnadóttir; Rutger Hoedemaekers
- Country of origin: Iceland
- Original languages: Icelandic; English; Danish
- No. of seasons: 3
- No. of episodes: 28

Production
- Executive producer: Sigurjón Kjartansson
- Producers: Magnus V. Sigurdsson; Baltasar Kormákur
- Production locations: Siglufjörður, Iceland; Seyðisfjörður, Iceland; Reykjavík, Iceland
- Cinematography: Bergsteinn Björgúlfsson
- Editor: Sigvaldi J. Kárason
- Running time: 50 minutes (approx.)
- Production company: RVK Studios

Original release
- Network: RÚV
- Release: 27 December 2015 – present

Trapped (Icelandic: Ófærð) is an Icelandic television mystery drama series, created by Baltasar Kormákur and produced by RVK Studios. It was broadcast in Iceland on 27 December 2015 on RÚV. Co-written by Sigurjón Kjartansson and Clive Bradley, the first series of ten episodes follows Andri Ólafsson (Ólafur Darri Ólafsson), the chief of police in a remote town in Iceland, solving the murder of a former townsman whose mutilated corpse is recovered by fishermen. The series was directed by Kormákur, Baldvin Z, Óskar Thor Axelsson and Börkur Sigthorsson.

Golden Globe winner Jóhann Jóhannsson with Hildur Gudnadóttir and Rutger Hoedemaekers composed the music. Sigurjón Kjartansson acted as executive producer, alongside Kormákur and Magnus V. Sigurdsson as producers. Dagblaðið Vísir reported on 2 May 2015 that Trapped is the most expensive television series ever made in Iceland, with overall costs estimated to be about 1,000,000,000 ISK (€6,500,000 EUR). Before this, most Icelandic television series rarely exceeded production costs of 100–200,000,000 ISK. RVK Studios provided most of the funding, while Creative Europe also supported the project with 75,000,000 ISK. Filming for the first series took place in Siglufjörður, Seyðisfjörður and Reykjavík between December 2014 and May 2015.

The series received its worldwide premiere at the Toronto International Film Festival on 20 September 2015. It has since been sold to numerous broadcasters across the world, including the BBC, which began screening it in the United Kingdom on BBC Four on 13 February 2016. The Weinstein Company announced it had purchased the US distribution rights in September 2015.

In September 2016, RÚV announced that a ten-episode second series had been commissioned for broadcast in late 2018 featuring the same lead characters. Principal photography for the second series began in October 2017 in Siglufjörður. The first episode was premiered on RÚV on 26 December 2018, and broadcast on BBC Four during February/March 2019, with two episodes being shown back-to-back.

Although early work on a third series was already underway by December 2018, with filming commencing in September 2020, the third series did not premiere on RÚV until 17 October 2021. It was released internationally on Netflix under the title Entrapped on 8 September 2022, edited into six episodes, compared to the original eight.

== Cast ==
=== Main cast ===
- Ólafur Darri Ólafsson as Andri Ólafsson, Siglufjörður chief of police (season 1), Reykjavík detective (season 2-3)
- Ilmur Kristjánsdóttir as Hinrika Kristjánsdóttir, Siglufjörður police officer, later chief of police
- Ingvar Eggert Sigurðsson as Ásgeir Þórarinsson, Siglufjörður police officer (Season 1-2), murder victim
- Björn Hlynur Haraldsson as Trausti Einarssson, chief of the Reykjavik Bureau of Investigation
- Elva María Birgisdóttir as Þórhildur, Andri and Agnes's older daughter, returns to Siglufjörður (Season 1-2)
- Nína Dögg Filippusdóttir as Agnes Eiríksdóttir, Andri's ex-wife, resides in Reykjavík
- Baltasar Breki Samper as Hjörtur Stefánsson, Dagný's boyfriend, who survived the fire; later married, supervisor at Siglufjörður factory (Season 1-2)
- Guðjón Pedersen as Bárður, Hinrika's husband
- Salka Sól Eyfeld as Soffia, friend of Jóhanna
- Júlia Guðrún Lovisa Henje as Perla, Andri and Agnes's younger daughter
- Katla M. Þorgeirsdóttir as Laufey Eiríksdóttir, Agnes's other sister
- Sigrún Edda Björnsdóttir as Kolbrún, Hrafn's wife, later a local politician

=== Introduced season 1 ===
- Þorsteinn Gunnarsson as Eiríkur Davidsson, Agnes's father
- Bjarne Henriksen as Søren Carlsen, ferry captain
- Þorsteinn Bachmann as Sigurður Gudmundsson, harbourmaster, Guðmundur's son
- Pálmi Gestsson as Hrafn Eysteinsson, Siglufjörður mayor, former police chief
- Jóhann Sigurðarson as Leifur, owner of the fish factory and María's father
- Steinunn Ólína Þorsteinsdóttir as Aldís Grímsdóttir, teacher, Sigurður's wife
- Hanna María Karlsdóttir as Þórhildur, Agnes's mother
- Ólafía Hrönn Jónsdóttir as Freyja, Hjörtur's mother
- Rúnar Freyr Gíslason as Sigvaldi, Agnes's new partner
- Jasmín Dúfa Pitt as Jóhanna, Laufey's daughter
- Vytautas Narbutas as Jonas Malakauskas, Lithuanian trafficker
- Grace Achieng as Joy, a Nigerian girl
- Marta Quental as Nishadi, Joy's younger sister
- Hans Tórgarð as Dvalin Knudsson, ferry engineer
- Georg Leite de Oliveira Santos as Ayanike, ferry chef
- Lilja Nótt Þórarinsdóttir as María, colleague of Hrafn, daughter of Leifur
- Jón Pétursson as Maggi, María's child
- Kristján Franklin Magnúss as Guðni, hotel owner
- Magnús Ragnarsson as Friðrik Davíðsson, an MP
- Sigurður Karlsson as Guðmundur, fisherman
- Eysteinn Sigurðarson as Hjálmar, a young man
- Sigurður Skúlason as Rögnvaldur, man in a wheelchair
- Jóel Sæmundsson as Þór Snædal, Trausti's colleague
- Arnar Jónsson as Ævar, a senior Reykjavik police officer
- Guðrun Gísladóttir as Ragna, a TV journalist
- Stefán Jónsson as Geirmundur Jónsson
- Rán Ísóld Eysteinsdóttir as Dagný Eiríksdóttir, Agnes's sister who died in a fire 7 years before series 1

=== Introduced Season 2 ===
- Sólveig Arnarsdóttir as Halla, Minister of Industry
- Þorgeir Tryggvason as Gisli, Halla, Elin and Ólafur's brother
- Steinn Ármann Magnússon as Ketill, Siglufjörður farmer, protests against the factory
- Stormur Jón Kormákur Baltasarsson as Aron, Þórhildur's boyfriend
- Unnur Ösp Stefánsdóttir as Elin, Aron's mother and Halla, Gisli, and Ólafur's sister
- Guðjón Davíð Karlsson as Finnur, Aron's father
- Aron Már Ólafsson as Víkingur, son of Gisli and Steinunn, Siglufjörður factory worker
- Elva Ósk Ólafsdóttir as Steinunn, Vikingur's mother
- Valdimar Örn Flygenring as Ólafur, Steinunn's husband, Halla, Gisli, and Elin's brother
- Kingsford Siayor as Ebo, Ghanaian worker at Siglufjörður factory
- Arnmundur Ernst Björnsson as Stefán, Siglufjörður factory worker
- Valur Freyr Einarsson as David, factory manager
- Dar Salim as Jamal Al Othman
- Sigurbjartur Atlason as Skúli, Ketill's son
- Vignir Rafn Valþórsson as Torfi, Skúli's brother

=== Introduced Season 3 ===
- Jóhann Kristófer Stefánsson as Ívar, a member an Icelandic cult called The Family whose murder is the catalyst for the season's investigation; previously Andri had suspected his involvement in the disappearance of his then-girlfriend Lina
- Haraldur Stefánsson as Gunnar the estranged son of Oddur Jacobson, patriarch of The Family, and a former friend of Ivar. A member of his uncle's Hopper biker gang The Horns
- Thomas Bo Larsen as Danish Hopper, the violent leader of the biker gang The Horns; also wanted for his role in a methamphetamine racket
- Egill Ólafsson as Oddur Jacobson, a naturalist and leader of the cult, The Family; father of Gunnar
- Christina M Goldstein as Lina, a missing girl; the sister of Bergur and former girlfriend of Ivar
- Friðrik Róbertsson as Flosi, a young, misguided member of Gunnar's biker gang
- Emil B. Kárason as Logi, Hinrika's nephew
- Baldur T. Hreinsson as Kristjan, Ivar's father
- Halldóra Björnsdóttir as Magdalena, Ivar's mother
- María Pálsdóttir as Sigrún, a mortician
- María Thelma Smáradóttir as Elisabeth, a biker in Gunnar's gang
- Íris Tanja Flygenring as Freyja, Danish Hopper's girlfriend
- Heiddis Chadwick Hlynsdóttir as Dalla, another member of Gunnar's gang; Elisabeth's girlfriend
- Glódís Erla Ólafsdóttir as Eva, Gunnar's stepsister
- Skúli Gautason as Örn, police chief superintendent
- Snæfriður Ingvarsdóttir as Hrönn, a member of The Family who's attacked by The Horns
- Kara Ingudóttir as Sóley, a waitress at Bergur's bar and Ivar's current girlfriend
- Sigurður Þór Óskarsson as Bergur, a drug dealer working as a barista; brother of Lina
- Margrét Vilhjálmsdóttir as Asa, matriarch of The Family; having an affair with Ivar
- Atli Rafn Sigurðsson as Snorri, a member of The Family
- Ingibjörg Stefánsdóttir as Rósa, a member of The Family
- Davíð Guðbrandsson as Sverrir, Bergur's boyfriend and an informant reporting on Danish Hopper
- Hannes Óli Ágústsson as Baby Lars, a member of The Horns and Hopper's righthand man
- Svandís Dóra Einarsdóttir as Sonja, chief of the narcotics division; investigating Danish Hopper
- Arnar Dan as Haraldur, a narcotics cop
- Björn Jörundur Friðbjörnsson as Ísak, a cop
- Davíð Þór Katrínarson as Hákon

== Episodes ==
=== Overview ===
Series	Episodes	Originally released	
Series	Episodes	First released	Last released
1	10	13 February 2016	13 March 2016
2	10	16 February 2019	16 March 2019
3	8	17 October 2021	5 December 2021

=== Series 1 (2016) ===
No.	Title	Directed by	Written by	Original release date	UK viewers (millions)
1	"Þáttur 1 (Episode 1)"	Baltasar Kormákur	Sigurjón Kjartansson & Clive Bradley	13 February 2016	1.27
2	"Þáttur 2 (Episode 2)"	Baldvin Zophoníasson	Sigurjón Kjartansson, Clive Bradley & Jóhann Ævar Grímsson	13 February 2016	1.12
3	"Þáttur 3 (Episode 3)"	Baldvin Zophoníasson	Sigurjón Kjartansson, Clive Bradley & Ólafur Egilsson	20 February 2016	0.97
4	"Þáttur 4 (Episode 4)"	Baldvin Zophoníasson	Sigurjón Kjartansson, Clive Bradley, Ólafur Egilsson & Jóhann Ævar Grímsson	20 February 2016	0.92
5	"Þáttur 5 (Episode 5)"	Óskar Thór Axelsson	Sigurjón Kjartansson, Clive Bradley & Ólafur Egilsson	27 February 2016	0.97
6	"Þáttur 6 (Episode 6)"	Börkur Sigþórsson	Sigurjón Kjartansson, Clive Bradley & Jóhann Ævar Grímsson	27 February 2016	0.93
7	"Þáttur 7 (Episode 7)"	Óskar Thór Axelsson	Sigurjón Kjartansson, Clive Bradley, Ólafur Egilsson & Jóhann Ævar Grímsson	6 March 2016	1.09
8	"Þáttur 8 (Episode 8)"	Óskar Thór Axelsson	Sigurjón Kjartansson, Clive Bradley, Ólafur Egilsson & Jóhann Ævar Grímsson	6 March 2016	1.08
9	"Þáttur 9 (Episode 9)"	Börkur Sigþórsson	Sigurjón Kjartansson & Clive Bradley	13 March 2016	1.11
10	"Þáttur 10 (Episode 10)"	Baltasar Kormákur	Sigurjón Kjartansson & Clive Bradley	13 March 2016	1.05

=== Series 2 (2019) ===
No.	Title	Directed by	Written by	Original release date	UK viewers (millions)
11	"Þáttur 1 (Episode 1)"	Baltasar Kormákur	Clive Bradley & Sigurjón Kjartansson	16 February 2019	1.31
12	"Þáttur 2 (Episode 2)"	Börkur Sigþórsson	Clive Bradley	16 February 2019	1.12
13	"Þáttur 3 (Episode 3)"	Börkur Sigþórsson	Margrét Örnólfsdóttir, Sigurjón Kjartansson & Clive Bradley	23 February 2019	1.04
14	"Þáttur 4 (Episode 4)"	Ugla Hauksdóttir	Sigurjón Kjartansson & Clive Bradley	23 February 2019	0.99
15	"Þáttur 5 (Episode 5)"	Börkur Sigþórsson	Clive Bradley	2 March 2019	0.94
16	"Þáttur 6 (Episode 6)"	Börkur Sigþórsson	Sigurjón Kjartansson & Clive Bradley	2 March 2019	0.95
17	"Þáttur 7 (Episode 7)"	Ugla Hauksdóttir	Holly Phillips, Sigurjón Kjartansson & Clive Bradley	9 March 2019	0.91
18	"Þáttur 8 (Episode 8)"	Óskar Thór Axelsson	Sigurjón Kjartansson & Clive Bradley	9 March 2019	0.91
19	"Þáttur 9 (Episode 9)"	Óskar Thór Axelsson	Clive Bradley	16 March 2019	0.86
20	"Þáttur 10 (Episode 10)"	Baltasar Kormákur	Sigurjón Kjartansson & Clive Bradley	16 March 2019	0.86

=== Series 3 (2021) ===
No.	Title	Directed by	Written by	Original release date	UK viewers (millions)
21	"Þáttur 1 (Episode 1)"	Baltasar Kormákur	Clive Bradley	14 October 2021	N/A
22	"Þáttur 2 (Episode 2)"	Börkur Sigþórsson	Clive Bradley & Sigurjón Kjartansson	24 October 2021	N/A
23	"Þáttur 3 (Episode 3)"	Börkur Sigþórsson	Clive Bradley	31 October 2021	N/A
24	"Þáttur 4 (Episode 4)"	Börkur Sigþórsson	Clive Bradley & Gagga Jonsdottir	7 November 2021	N/A
25	"Þáttur 5 (Episode 5)"	Katrín Björgvinsdóttir	Clive Bradley & Gagga Jonsdottir	14 November 2021	N/A
26	"Þáttur 6 (Episode 6)"	Katrín Björgvinsdóttir	Clive Bradley	21 November 2021	N/A
27	"Þáttur 7 (Episode 7)"	Katrín Björgvinsdóttir	Clive Bradley & David Mar Stefansson	28 November 2021	N/A
28	"Þáttur 8 (Episode 8)"	Baltasar Kormákur	Clive Bradley & David Mar Stefansson	5 December 2021	N/A

== Broadcast ==
The first episode received its worldwide premiere at the 2015 Toronto International Film Festival on 20 September 2015, as part of the festival's new Primetime platform of selected television projects. The first series began broadcasting on RÚV in Iceland on 27 December 2015, and broadcasting rights have since been sold to several countries. The series commenced on NRK1 in Norway on 18 January 2016, under the title Innesperret, and on Yle Fem in Finland on 2 February under the titles Fångade (Swedish) and Loukussa (Finnish). The series first aired on BBC Four in the United Kingdom on 13 February and on RTÉ2 in Ireland on 21 February under the title Trapped.

The series has also aired on France 2 in France, and on ZDF in Germany. In Australia, SBS on Demand released the first season for streaming on 16 June 2016, followed by a televisual broadcast on SBS One on 30 November 2016. In Poland, Ale Kino+ began broadcasting the series on 7 September 2016, airing two episodes per week, back-to-back. In Denmark, DR2 began broadcasting the series on 30 November 2016, airing two episodes per week, back-to-back, under the title Fanget.

In the United States, Viceland began broadcasting the first season on 19 February 2017, and the second season premiered on Amazon Prime Video on 10 July 2019. In Belgium, Canvas began broadcasting the series on 11 March 2017. In Portugal, RTP2 began broadcasting the series under the title Encurralados on 13 October 2017. In the Czech Republic, ČT2 began broadcasting the series under the title V Pasti on 12 January 2018. In Italy, TIMvision made the first series available on demand from 5 February 2018.

== See also ==
- Nordic noir
