= RVK Studios =

Icelandic film production company

- Industry: Film
- Founder: Baltasar Kormákur
- Headquarters: Reykjavík, Iceland
- Products: Motion pictures, television films

RVK Studios (stylized on-screen as Rvk. STUDIOS) is an Icelandic film production company. It superseded Blueeyes Productions by making all future productions from now on. The company's director and chairman of the board is Baltasar Kormákur who is a highly acclaimed director, writer and producer on an international scale. RVK Studios mainly creates Icelandic drama films and TV shows for an international audience.

After the merger, RVK studios has produced big films like Everest, The Oath and TV shows like Trapped. More films and TV shows are in production, such as Víkingr, Mules, Katla, and Eve.
