= Guðlaugur Friðþórsson =

Icelandic fisherman and disaster survivor

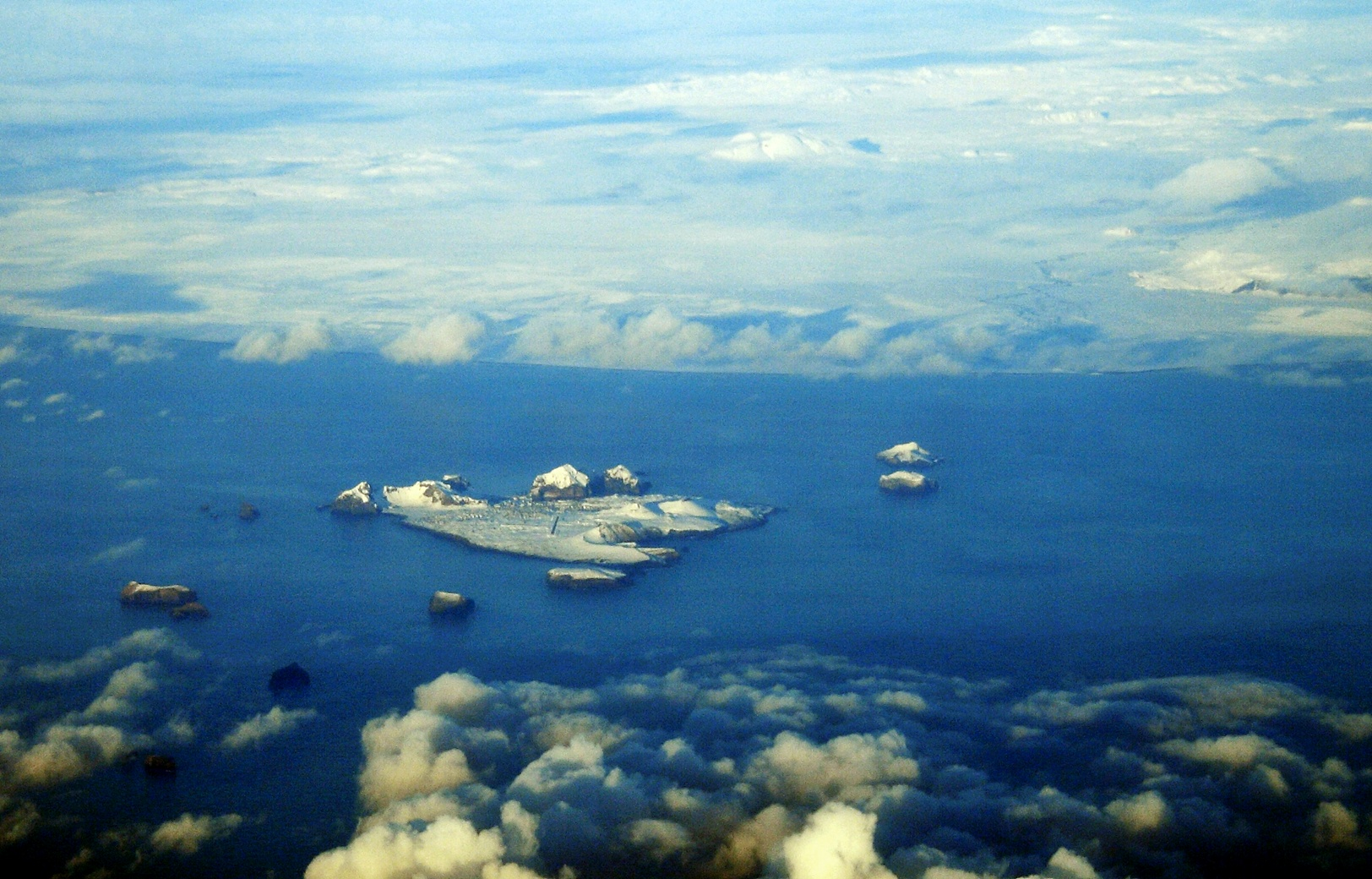
Aerial view of the Westman Isles (Vestmannaeyjar), looking north, with the Icelandic mainland in the background. Heimaey is the larger island in the centre.

Guðlaugur Friðþórsson is an Icelandic fisherman who in 1984 survived six hours in 5 °C (41 °F) cold water after his vessel capsized. After swimming to land he then trekked for another three hours across lava fields to reach a town for help.

== Sequence of events ==
On 11 March 1984, Guðlaugur and four other fishermen were fishing off the coast of Heimaey near the Westman Islands when their boat capsized at about 10 p.m.

As the boat sank, Guðlaugur and two out of four other crewmen climbed on to the keel. After about 45 minutes, they swam towards the shore; two disappearing within 10 minutes. The only survivor of the crew of five, Guðlaugur swam for five to six hours in 5–6 °C (41–43 °F) water the 6 km (3.7 mi) to the island, wearing a shirt, sweater and jeans, guided by a lighthouse. He claimed to have remained clear-headed throughout.

Reaching the shore of Heimaey, Guðlaugur found himself at the most dangerous section of the island's coastline, due mainly to the waves hitting the coastal lava rock formations. After searching for and finding a suitable, flatter part of the shoreline, he finally got to land but had to walk with bare feet over about 3 km (1.9 mi) of volcanic scree. When he knocked on a door at 7 a.m., nine hours after the boat had sunk, he was taken to the hospital. Guðlaugur's body temperature was below 34 °C (93 °F) yet he showed almost no symptoms of hypothermia or vasodilatation, only of dehydration.

== Reasons for survival ==
Guðlaugur weighed about 125kg with a subcutaneous layer of fat 1 inch (25 mm) thick around his abdomen which helped insulate him against the cold and provide energy for the swim. In autumn 1985, Jóhann Axelsson, head of Department of Physiology at the University of Iceland in Reykjavík, who had included Guðlaugur in an ongoing study about hypothermia, took Guðlaugur to London to see William Keatinge of the Physiology Department of the London Hospital Medical College and an expert in hypothermia. Together, they demonstrated that the 23-year old, 125 kg (276 lb) Icelander had phenomenal resistance to cold.

== See also ==
- The Deep – 2012 movie based on Guðlaugur's survival story
