= Jón Atli Jónasson =

Icelandic playwright and screenwriter (born 1972)

Jón Atli Jónasson (born 1972 in Reykjavík) is an Icelandic playwright and screenwriter. He has written for several films. He is a founding member of the Mindgroup, a European umbrella group of people involved in experimental theater. Considered one of the foremost Icelandic playwrights, he has refused to accept nominations from Gríman, the Icelandic Theater Awards.
