= Katla (TV series) =

Icelandic television series

- Promotional poster
- Genre: Mystery; Drama; Horror
- Created by: Sigurjón Kjartansson; Baltasar Kormákur
- Written by: Sigurjón Kjartansson; David Mar Stefansson; Lilja Sigurðardóttir
- Directed by: Baltasar Kormákur; Börkur Sigþórsson; Þóra Hilmarsdóttir
- Starring: Guðrún Eyfjörð; Íris Tanja Flygenring; Ingvar Sigurðsson; Aliette Opheim; Valter Skarsgård; Aldís Amah Hamilton; Þorsteinn Bachmann; Sólveig Arnarsdóttir; Haraldur Ari Stefánsson; Björn Thors; Birgitta Birgisdóttir; Hlynur Atli Harðarson; Helga Braga Jónsdóttir; Björn Ingi Hilmarsson
- Composer: Högni Egilsson
- Country of origin: Iceland
- Original languages: Icelandic; Swedish; English
- No. of seasons: 1
- No. of episodes: 8

Production
- Producers: Agnes Johansen; Baltasar Kormákur; Magnús Viðar Sigurðsson
- Cinematography: Bergsteinn Björgúlfsson
- Editors: Sigurður Eyþórsson; Sigvaldi J. Kárason
- Production company: RVK Studios

Original release
- Network: Netflix
- Release: 17 June 2021

Katla (stylized as KATLA) is an Icelandic mystery-drama television series created by Baltasar Kormákur and Sigurjón Kjartansson. The show premiered on 17 June 2021 on Netflix.

== Synopsis ==
A year after an eruption of the Katla volcano began, only a few people remain in the nearby town of Vík, persisting despite choking ash. An ash-caked woman who apparently disappeared twenty years earlier appears in the village, looking as she did back then. More ash-caked people who died in the past arrive in Vík, creating a paradox for those who knew them and reviving legends of "changelings". Meanwhile, a volcanologist from Reykjavík discovers the remains of a meteorite buried in the glacier, while having to deal emotionally with the reappearance of his dead son. Through their interactions with the "changelings", the inhabitants of Vík are forced to find their own ways of dealing with their unresolved issues from the past.

== Cast and characters ==
- Guðrún Eyfjörð as Gríma Þórsdóttir, younger sister of Ása
- Íris Tanja Flygenring as Ása Þórsdóttir, Gríma's older sister, who died a year ago.
- Ingvar Sigurðsson as Þór (Thor) Jonsson, father of Gríma, Ása, and Björn
- Aliette Opheim as Gunhild Halberg, in the present and as a young woman; mother of Björn
- Valter Skarsgård as Björn, son of Gunhild and Þór through an affair twenty years earlier
- Aldís Amah Hamilton as Eyja
- Þorsteinn Bachmann as Gísli Einar, head of the local police, husband of Magnea
- Sólveig Arnarsdóttir as Magnea in the present and as a young woman; wife of Gísli
- Haraldur Ari Stefánsson as Einar, son of Gísli and Magnea
- Björn Thors as Darri Hansson, volcanologist; husband of Rakel and father of Mikael
- Birgitta Birgisdóttir as Rakel, wife of Darri and mother of Mikael
- Hlynur Atli Harðarson as Mikael, son of Darri and Rakel who died in an accident years ago.
- Helga Braga Jónsdóttir as Vigdís
- Björn Ingi Hilmarsson as Leifur

== Episodes ==
No.	Title	Directed by	Written by	Original release date
1	"From Under the Glacier" (Icelandic: Undan Jöklinum)	Baltasar Kormákur	Sigurjón Kjartansson	17 June 2021
A year after the eruption of the Katla volcano, a mysterious naked woman shows up at a nearby village. Her name is Gunhild, and she worked at the Vik hotel about 20 years ago. Grima's father visits her and asks her why she won't go to Reykjavík, where life is easier, but she prefers to stay at the farm with her boyfriend, Kjartan. Researchers studying the output of the volcano find unexpected changes. Brenhild, the hotel owner, recognises Gunhild as a former employee. They call a house number and speak to Bjorn, the son of Gunhild, who then passes the phone to his mother. She hangs up, thinking it's a joke. Grima is out doing weather tests when in an abandoned house, she finds someone who turns out to be Ása, her sister, also covered in black soot.
2	"Ása"	Baltasar Kormákur	Lilja Sigurðardóttir	17 June 2021
A flashback shows how Ása got stuck near Katla when her snowmobile wouldn't start, and the rest of her group inadvertently left her behind. Darri and Rakel, a couple on the brink of divorce, argue about the tombstone for their son Mikael, who has been dead for nearly three years. The scientists discuss whether the town must be evacuated following new developments from Katla. Gisli reads from the Bible for Magnea, his wife, who is dying of lung cancer. The nurse Vigdis reveals that young Gunhild's urine tests show she is pregnant. Present-day Gunhild travels from Sweden to Iceland to meet her namesake. Darri discovers Mikael in his bed, covered in soot.
3	"The Mother" (Icelandic: Móðirin)	Baltasar Kormákur	David Mar Stefansson	17 June 2021
A flashback shows a mother quietly leaving her two daughters behind as they run around the house. Darri hides Mikael in the bedroom of the weather station where he works. Ása is angry that Grima didn't find her while she was gone. Despite Grima's disapproval, Ása goes into the closed store of Magnea, the mother of her ex-boyfriend Einar. Both Gunhilds tell Thor the younger Gunhild is pregnant with his child. Ása and Grima talk about the loss of their mother. Darri locks Mikael up in a room after he asks disturbing questions about people around him dying. Ása and Grima go for a swim in a nearby lake. Mikael calls his mother using the emergency phone in the room where his father locked him up.
4	"This Is Not Him" (Icelandic: Þetta er ekki hann)	Þóra Hilmarsdóttir	Sigurjón Kjartansson	17 June 2021
Rakel drives to the hotel to meet Darri and Mikael. Grima takes Ása to the glacier where she disappeared. On the way there, they discuss their mother's suicide. Both Gunhilds visit Thor and while alone with him, current Gunhild reminds him of their one-night-stand 20 years ago. After she leaves, younger Gunhild tells Thor she is expecting his baby. Rakel and Darri argue about how Mikael lit his school on fire and she covered it up. Ása and Grima dig underneath a building and discover a dead body.
5	"Northerly Winds" (Icelandic: Norðanátt)	Börkur Sigþórsson	David Mar Stefansson	17 June 2021
Ása comes home and sees her father kissing a woman she doesn't know (young Gunhild). Darri calls the police, because he doesn't trust Mikael, but Rakel overhears the police coming and flees with the boy in the car. Ása goes to Vigdis in the hospital to ask her if she can stay the night there. Gisli wants to ask Grima questions about the discovery of the body. Mikael says he wishes his father would die, and he tells his mother that the school burning was an accident, but the thought of the children burning in the school made him happy; the car accident was intentional, because he wanted to die. Mikael exits the car to pee, and his mother drives away from him. Grima encounters a girl covered in soot who says she is Grima.
6	"Gríma"	Börkur Sigþórsson	David Mar Stefansson	17 June 2021
Rakel feels guilty and turns around to get Mikael, but he has walked off and is picked up by a middle-aged couple, whom he tells about his dad locking him up. Einar kisses the younger version of his wife. Grima calls Kjartan to ask when he'll be home, because she's uneasy with the new Grima being in their house. Bjorn figures out that his mother being in Iceland 20 years ago was right around the time he was conceived. Thor sees that young Gunhild is bleeding badly and takes her to the hospital, where Vigdis takes care of her. Gisli has a disagreement with the new Magnea and locks her in the basement. The middle-aged couple tells Darri and Rakel that they called the police because of the stories Mikael told them; Darri and Rakel argue about whose fault it is. The couple takes Mikael in their car to bring him to the police in Reykjavík, but on the road, Mikael kills the woman with a knife, causing the man to crash the car and die also, after which Mikael disappears. Grima and Gisli go to the site of the crash, with Grima leaving a message for Kjartan, telling him the woman in their house isn't her.
7	"The Rock" (Icelandic: Steinninn)	Börkur Sigþórsson	David Mar Stefansson	17 June 2021
Rakel tells the police the story of how her dead son recently showed up again. Grima is inclined to listen to them, but Gisli isn't. Rakel and Grima go to meet Darri to talk about the four mysterious people who have shown up so far. Einar calls Grima to let her know that the body Ása and she unearthed is in fact Ása. Bjorn shows up at Thor's house, having flown in from Sweden. Kjartan and Grima argue, because Kjartan thinks Grima is hallucinating with her theory about the changelings. Darri wants to test if there is anything in the volcanic rocks of that makes the changelings appear, so he descends to take samples. Gisli poisons Magnea so he can continue his life with the healthy Magnea. While Darri is in the cave, he finds more people covered in soot waking up, but he decides to leave and not tell his coworkers. He takes a piece of rock to the lab and finds it coalescing in strange ways, and he tells his coworkers it has to be a meteorite never before seen before in Solar System. In the basement, Magnea finds a hammer and escapes by smashing a window. Grima finds Kjartan in the bedroom with the new Grima. Grima tells Ása it was her body they found. Ása says she has no purpose left in life and walks into the ocean, just like their mother did years ago.
8	"I Am You" (Icelandic: Ég er þú)	Baltasar Kormákur	Sigurjón Kjartansson	17 June 2021
Thor tells Gunhild that the baby young Gunhild is carrying has genetic defects and that she is not to blame. Mikael tells his parents that he killed the woman in the car, and they force him to give up his knife. Gisli puts his sick wife in the car and goes to look for the healthy Magnea with a shotgun, but she escapes with the car with the other Magnea in it. Present Gunhild wants to go back to Sweden, but Bjorn wants to stay behind and get to know Thor better. Darri and Rakel take Mikael into the sea and drown him. Gisli's son Einar comes home and finds the medication his dad poisoned his mother with; he subsequently attacks Gisli. Grima talks to her new version, who gets along with Kjartan better than she does. She plays Russian roulette with her new half to decide which one of them has to die, and the new Grima eventually shoots herself in the head. Gisli repents at the altar, while both Magneas drive into the still-erupting Katla. Bjorn, Thor, and Kjartan listen while the old Grima plays the piano for the first time since Ása died. Outside, an army of soot-covered people walks towards the town.

== Production ==
In February 2017, Variety magazine reported that Baltasar Kormákur would be working on Katla, a supernatural drama series centered on the volcano of the same name, with filming to take place outside Reykjavík. In October 2019, it was reported that RVK Studios was developing the series for Netflix, to be directed by Kormákur and Sigurjón Kjartansson. The series started production prior to the COVID-19 pandemic, and the subsequent forced shutdown put a halt to the work, which had covered a few weeks by that point. Kormákur resumed production in April 2020.

== Critical reception ==
On the review aggregator website Rotten Tomatoes, 100% of 12 critics' reviews are positive, with an average rating of 7.8/10.

John Doyle of The Globe and Mail wrote: "In what is a slow-moving, Stygian and enigmatic eight-part series ... there's a beguiling mystery about heartbreak." Robyn Chowdhury of New Scientist praised the series in her review, concluding: "Katla is a thriller with such depth that some episodes, particularly the fast-paced season finale, can leave you feeling genuinely emotionally raw. It is a story about grief with unpredictably dark twists and turns, worthy of multiple watches."

== See also ==
- The Returned, French TV series
- Glitch, Australian TV series
- In the Flesh, British TV series
