= Baltasar Kormákur =

Icelandic filmmaker

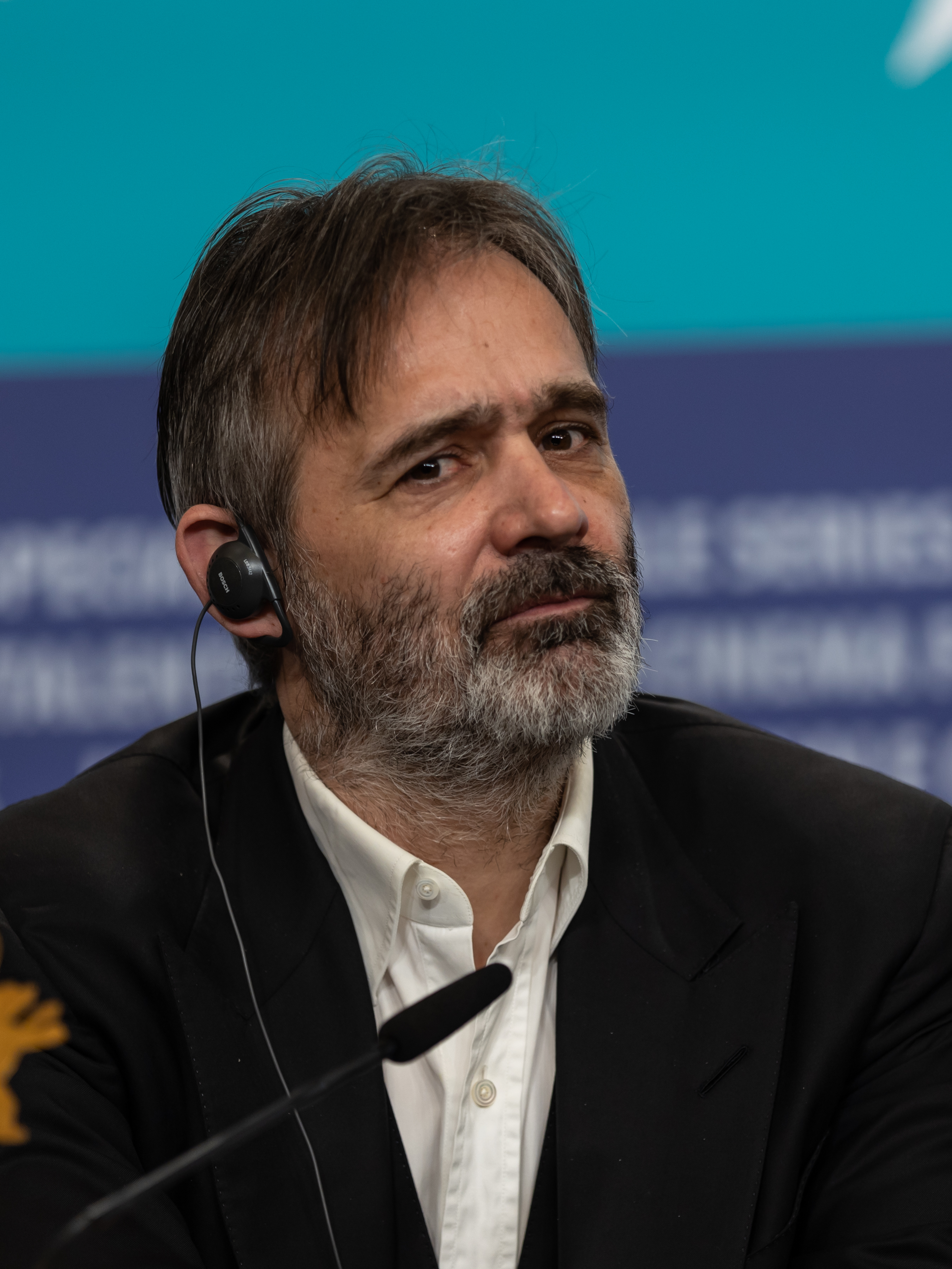
- Baltasar in 2022
- Born: Baltasar Kormákur Baltasarsson; Reykjavík, Iceland
- Education: Iceland University of the Arts
- Occupations: Actor; film director; film producer; screenwriter
- Years active: 1992–present
- Children: Baltasar Breki Samper
- Website: rvkstudios.is

Baltasar Kormákur Baltasarsson is an Icelandic actor, theatre and film director, and film producer. He directed the films 101 Reykjavík, The Sea, A Little Trip to Heaven, Contraband, 2 Guns, Everest, Touch, and the TV series Katla.

== Early life and education ==
Baltasar Kormákur Baltasarsson was born in Reykjavík, Iceland. His father is the Spanish painter Baltasar Samper, and his mother is Kristjana Guðnadóttir Samper.

== Career ==
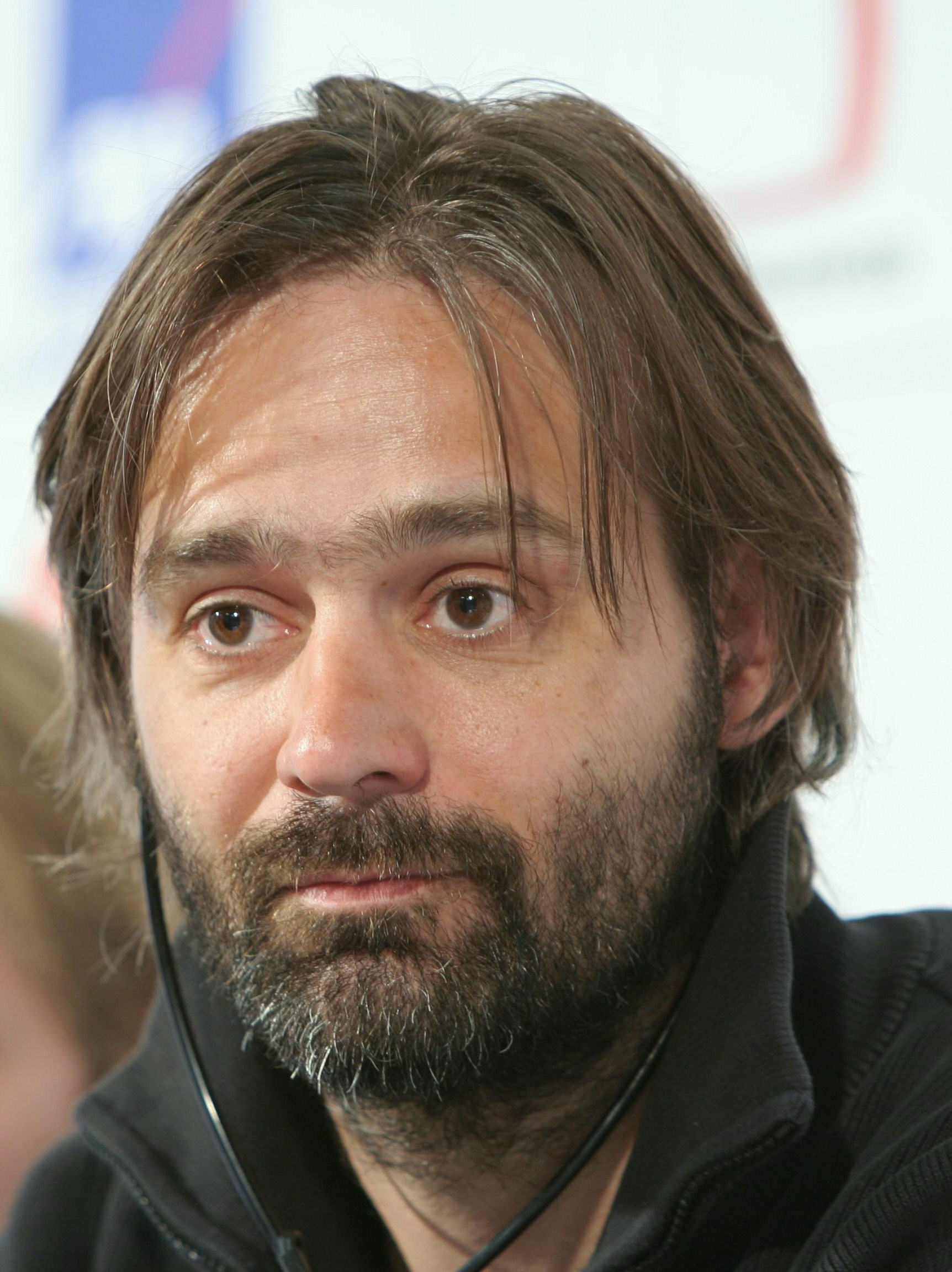
Baltasar in 2007

In 1995, Baltasar played Natan opposite María Ellingsen in the drama feature Agnes, directed by Egill Eðvarðsson.

In 1999, he founded the film production company Blueeyes with his then wife, Lilja Pálmadóttir. Agnes Johansen (1958–2025) was another producer at the company, and Daði Einarsson joined later.

For his film Jar City, Baltasar won the Crystal Globe award at the Karlovy Vary International Film Festival in 2007.

In December 2011, the production of drama film Rocketman was announced, with Baltasar Kormákur and Dagur Kári set to direct.

Baltasar's 2012 film The Deep was selected as the Icelandic entry for the Best Foreign Language Oscar at the 85th Academy Awards, making the January shortlist.

In January 2013, it was announced that a new film, Rocketman, would be produced by Baltasar with his partner Agnes Johansen, with Danish production company Nimbus Film co-producing. The film's expected release was 2015.

In February 2015, it was announced that his next film would be the crime-thriller The Oath, which is based on a script by actor Ólafur Egilsson.

In 2020, Baltasar began production of the Netflix science fiction series Katla, released in the following year.

His 2024 film Touch, based on the eponymous novel by Ólafur Jóhann Ólafsson, became the closing film at Filmfest München.

Kormákur directed and co-produced the 2026 Netflix film Apex, a survival thriller starring Charlize Theron and Taron Egerton, set in Australia.

== Personal life ==
Baltasar's first wife was Lilja Pálmadóttir, and their son is actor Baltasar Breki Samper. In 2019, they announced their separation after a 20-year relationship. Later that year, newspapers reported that Baltasar had begun a relationship with set designer Sunneva Ása Weisshappel.

== Filmography ==
=== Film ===
Year	Title	Director	Producer	Writer
1996	Go LazyTown	Yes	No	Yes
2000	101 Reykjavík	Yes	Yes	Yes
2002	The Sea	Yes	Yes	Yes
2005	A Little Trip to Heaven	Yes	Yes	Yes
2006	Jar City	Yes	Yes	Yes
2008	White Night Wedding	Yes	Yes	Yes
2010	Inhale	Yes	No	No
2012	Contraband	Yes	Yes	No
2012	The Deep	Yes	Yes	Yes
2013	2 Guns	Yes	No	No
2015	Everest	Yes	Yes	No
2016	The Oath	Yes	Yes	Yes
2018	Adrift	Yes	Yes	No
2022	Beast	Yes	Yes	No
2024	Touch	Yes	Yes	Yes
2026	Apex	Yes	Yes	No
2027	The Big Fix	Yes	Yes	No

Producer only

- Pop in Reykjavík (1998) (Documentary)
- Stormy Weather (2003)
- Dís (2004)
- The Amazing Truth About Queen Raquela (2008) (Executive producer)
- Reykjavík-Rotterdam (2008)
- Summerland (2010)
- Virgin Mountain (2015)
- Vultures (2018)
- Against the Ice (2022)

Acting roles

Year	Title	Role	Notes
1992	Wallpaper: Erotic Love Story	Lass	
1992	A Fairy of Our Time		Short film
1995	Agnes	Natan	
1996	Dream Hunters	Gunnar	
1996	Devil's Island	Baddi	
1999	Split	Fridrik	
2000	Angels of the Universe	Óli	
2000	101 Reykjavík	Þröstur	
2001	No Such Thing	Dr. Artaud	
2001	Me and Morrison	Askildsen	
2001	Regina	Ivan	
2003	Stormy Weather	Einar	
2008	Reykjavík-Rotterdam	Kristófer	
2016	The Oath	Finnur	

=== Television ===
Year	Title	Director	Producer	Notes
2013	Hulli	No	Executive	
2013	The Missionary	Yes	No	Television film
2015–2019	Trapped	Yes	Yes	Also creator
2016	The Mayor	No	Yes	
2021	Katla	Yes	Yes	Also creator
2025	King & Conqueror	Yes	Yes	Miniseries; episode: "Invitation"

== Awards and honors ==
Year	Award	Category	Nominated work	Result	Notes
2000	Chicago International Film Festival	Gold Hugo	101 Reykjavík	Nominated	New Directors Competition
2000	Edda Awards	Best Supporting Actor	Angels of the Universe	Nominated	
2000	Edda Awards	Best Film	101 Reykjavík	Nominated	Shared with: Ingvar Þórðarson
2000	Edda Awards	Best Director	101 Reykjavík	Nominated	
2000	Edda Awards	Best Screenplay	101 Reykjavík	Won	
2000	European Film Awards	European Discovery of the Year	101 Reykjavík	Nominated	
2000	Locarno International Film Festival	Golden Leopard	101 Reykjavík	Nominated	
2000	Locarno International Film Festival	Youth Jury Award: Euro<26	101 Reykjavík	Won	
2000	Lübeck Nordic Film Days	Prize of the Ecumenical Jury	101 Reykjavík	Won	
2000	Thessaloniki Film Festival	FIPRESCI Prize	101 Reykjavík	Won	"For the homogeneous and literary treating of complicated contemporary sexual relationships with a sense of humour."
2000	Toronto International Film Festival	Discovery Award	101 Reykjavík	Won	Tied With George Washington
2001	Berlin International Film Festival	Shooting Star		Won	
2001	Bogota Film Festival	Golden Precolumbian Circle	101 Reykjavík	Nominated	Best film
2001	Buenos Aires International Festival of Independent Cinema	Best Film	101 Reykjavík	Nominated	
2001	Pula Film Festival	Big Golden Arena	101 Reykjavík	Won	European Competition: Best Film
2001	Rouen Nordic Film Festival	Grand Jury Prize	101 Reykjavík	Won	
2001	Tbilisi International Film Festival	Prize of the Union of Georgian Filmmakers	101 Reykjavík	Won	
2002	Edda Awards	Best Screenplay	The Sea	Won	Shared with: Ólafur Haukur Símonarson
2002	Edda Awards	Best Film	The Sea	Won	
2002	Edda Awards	Best Director	The Sea	Won	
2002	Nordic Council Film Prize	Icelandic Entry	The Sea	Nominated	
2002	San Sebastián Film Festival	Golden Seashell	The Sea	Nominated	
2003	Istanbul International Film Festival	Golden Tulip	The Sea	Nominated	
2003	Istanbul International Film Festival	FIPRESCI Prize	The Sea	Won	"For its deep observation of social and cultural wounds of a disintegrating family faced with globalization."
2003	Tromsø International Film Festival	Audience Award	The Sea	Won	
2005	Nordic Council Film Prize	Icelandic Entry	Dís	Nominated	Shared with: Silja Hauksdóttir (director, writer), Birna Anna Björnsdóttir (writer), Oddný Sturludóttir (writer) and Agnes Johansen (producer)
2006	Cognac Festival du Film Policier	Critics Award	A Little Trip to Heaven	Won	
2006	Edda Awards	Best Film	Jar City	Won	Shared with: Agnes Johansen and Lilja Pálmadóttir (producers)
2006	Edda Awards	Best Director	Jar City	Won	
2006	Göteborg Film Festival	FIPRESCI Prize	A Little Trip to Heaven	Won	
2006	Nordic Council Film Prize	Icelandic Entry	A Little Trip to Heaven	Nominated	Shared with: Edward Martin Weinman (writer) and Sigurjón Sighvatsson (producer)
2007	Nordic Council Film Prize	Icelandic Entry	Jar City	Nominated	Shared with: Agnes Johansen and Lilja Pálmadóttir (producers)
2007	Karlovy Vary International Film Festival	Crystal Globe	Jar City	Won	Shared with: Lilja Pálmadóttir (producer)
2007	Karlovy Vary International Film Festival	Don Quijote Award	Jar City	Won	
2008	Edda Awards	Best Film	White Night Wedding	Won	
2008	Nordic Council Film Prize	Icelandic Entry	White Night Wedding	Nominated	Shared with: Ólafur Egilsson (writer), Agnes Johansen, Kim Magnusson, and Lilja Pálmadóttir (producers)
2008	Valenciennes International Festival of Action and Adventure Films	Grand Prize	Jar City	Won	Shared with: Agnes Johansen and Lilja Pálmadóttir (producers)
2008	Valenciennes International Festival of Action and Adventure Films	Best Direct	Jar City	Won	
2010	Rouen Nordic Film Festival	Young Audience Award	White Night Wedding	Won	
2011	Edda Awards	Best Director	Inhale	Nominated	
2012	Les Arcs European Film Festival	Crystal Arrow	The Deep	Nominated	
2012	Mar del Plata Film Festival	Best Film	The Deep	Nominated	
2013	Edda Awards	Best Screenplay	The Deep	Nominated	Shared with: Jón Atli Jónasson
2013	Edda Awards	Best Director	The Deep	Won	
2013	European Film Awards	Audience Award	The Deep	Nominated	
2013	Göteborg Film Festival	Dragon Award	The Deep	Nominated	Best Nordic Film
2013	Locarno International Film Festival	Variety Piazza Grande Award	2 Guns	Nominated	
2013	Nordic Council Film Prize	Icelandic Entry	The Deep	Nominated	
2014	Göteborg Film Festival	Nordic Honorary Dragon Award		Won	
2015	CinemaCon	International Filmmaker of the Year		Won	
2015	Nordic Council Film Prize	Icelandic Entry	Virgin Mountain	Won	
2016	San Sebastián Film Festival	Golden Seashell	The Oath	Nominated	
2016	Prix Europa	Best Episode of a TV Fiction Series or Serial	Trapped	Won	
2017	Edda Awards	Television Show of the Year	Trapped	Won	Shared with: Magnús Viðar Sigurðsson
2017	Edda Awards	Best Film	The Oath	Nominated	Share: Magnús Viðar Sigurðsson
2017	Edda Awards	Best Director	The Oath	Nominated	
2017	Edda Awards	Screenplay of the Year	The Oath	Nominated	Shared with: Ólafur Egilsson
2024	Nordic Council Film Prize	Best Film	Touch	Nominated	Shared with: Ólafur Darri Ólafsson and Agnes Johansen
2025	Tromsø International Film Festival	Audience Award	Touch	Won	
2025	Palm Springs International Film Festival	Best Foreign Language Film	Touch	Won	
