= Ólafur Darri Ólafsson =

Icelandic-American actor (born 1973)

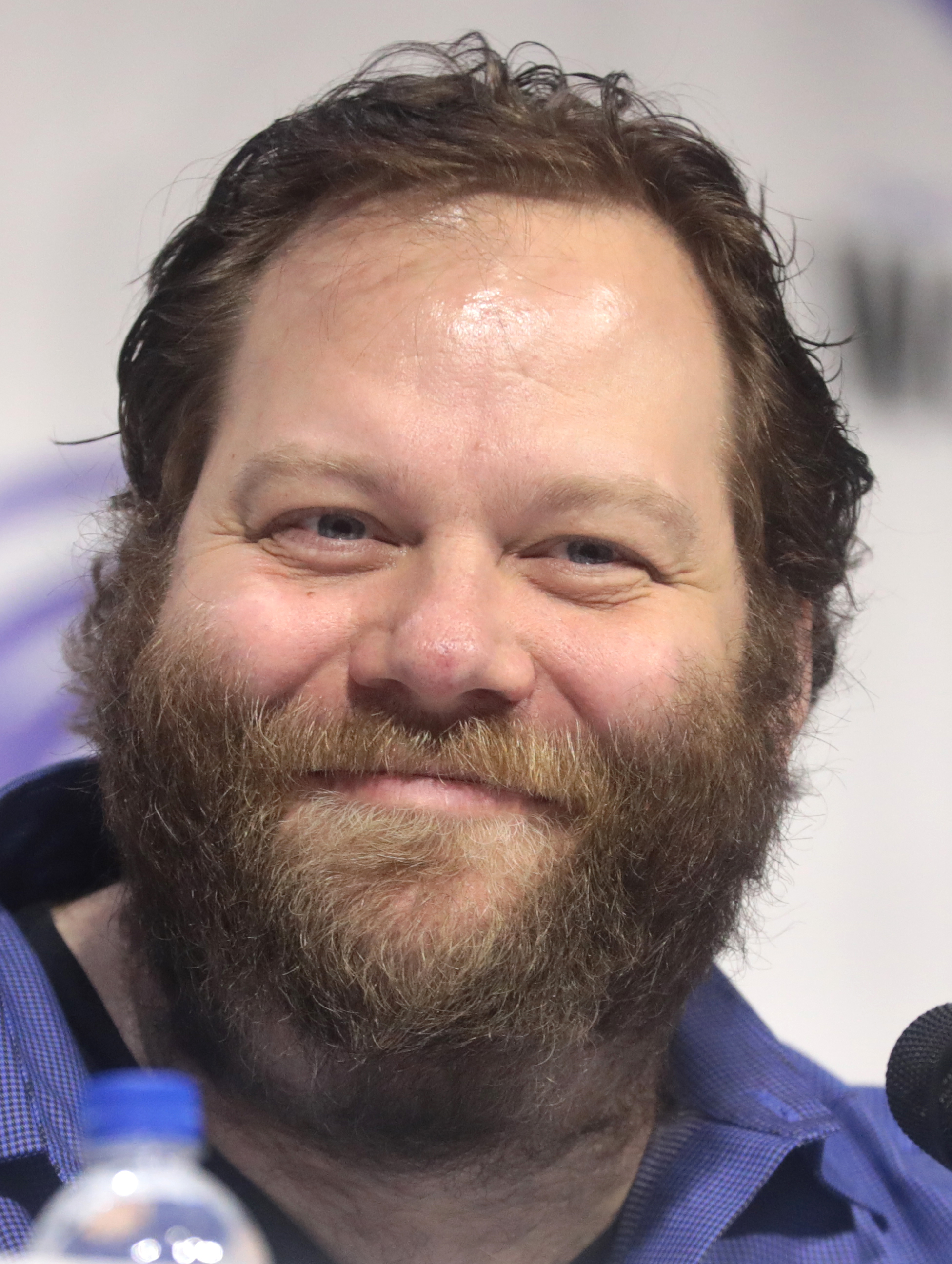
- Ólafur in 2019
- Born: 3 March 1973 (age 53); Connecticut, U.S.
- Citizenship: Iceland; United States
- Occupations: Actor; producer; screenwriter
- Years active: 1998–present
- Known for: Children; Fangavaktin; Trapped; The Minister; Severance
- Partner: Lovísa Ósk Gunnarsdóttir
- Children: 2

Ólafur Darri Ólafsson (born 3 March 1973) is an Icelandic and American actor, screenwriter, and producer, known for his roles in films such as Children, The Deep, The Secret Life of Walter Mitty, and Eurovision Song Contest: The Story of Fire Saga, in addition to television series such as Fangavaktin, Trapped, NOS4A2, Lady Dynamite, and Severance. He has also provided the Icelandic voice of characters in animated films such as Ice Age, Lilo & Stitch, Monsters, Inc., Shark Tale, Madagascar, Brother Bear, and Kung Fu Panda.

== Early life and education ==
Ólafur Darri Ólafsson was born in the US state of Connecticut on 3 March 1973, the son of Icelandic parents. His mother is a nurse, and his father was studying medicine in Connecticut at the time of his birth, thus granting Ólafur both Icelandic and American citizenship. He returned to Iceland with his parents when he was about four years old.

Ólafur grew up in Reykjavík, where he was educated at Reykjavík Junior College. He has admitted that he did not initially enjoy the change from the US to Iceland. When he was first sent to play outside, he instead stood still and cried until he was taken home. He also struggled to develop a sense of independence as a child, with his mother taking a job as the nurse at his school so that he would agree to attend.

He graduated from the Icelandic Drama School in 1998.

== Career ==
Ólafur became involved in numerous productions with the National Theatre of Iceland and Reykjavík City Theatre, in addition to various independent theatre groups. He co-founded the Vesturport theatre company in Reykjavík.

Ólafur is perhaps best known internationally for his role as Andri, Seyðisfjörður's chief of police, in the series Trapped. Series creator Baltasar Kormákur has said that Ólafur was chosen because he was not a typical leading man. Ólafur said that he based the character on his own father. The Guardian called his performance "as remarkable as the landscape".

In 2016, Ólafur appeared in the music video for "Winter Sound" by Of Monsters and Men.

In 2019, Ólafur was cast as Bing Partridge in the AMC series NOS4A2.

Ólafur has also provided the Icelandic voice of various characters in animated films such as Ice Age, Lilo & Stitch, Monsters, Inc., Shark Tale, Madagascar, Brother Bear, and Kung Fu Panda.

In January 2026, he was cast as the Norse god Thor in the upcoming live-action adaptation of the two Norse mythology-based video games in the God of War series.

== Personal life ==
Ólafur is in a relationship with Icelandic dancer Lovísa Ósk Gunnarsdóttir, with whom he has two daughters (born in 2010 and 2014).

Noted for his private nature, Ólafur has said that he struggles with public attention and prefers to watch films and cook for friends at home.

== Selected filmography ==
=== Film ===
List of film appearances, with year, title, and role shown
| Year | Title | Role | Notes |
|---|---|---|---|
| 2000 | Fíaskó | Gulli | |
| 2000 | 101 Reykjavík | Marri | |
| 2002 | True Love (Once Removed) | Waitress | Short |
| 2005 | Beowulf & Grendel | Unferth | |
| 2006 | Thicker than Water | Börkur | |
| 2006 | Children | Marinó | |
| 2007 | Parents | Marinó | |
| 2008 | White Night Wedding | Sjonni | |
| 2008 | Country Wedding | Egill | |
| 2008 | Reykjavík-Rotterdam | Elvar | |
| 2010 | Undercurrent | Sævar | |
| 2011 | Stormland | Böddi – Böðvar Steingrímsson | |
| 2012 | Contraband | Olaf | |
| 2012 | The Deep | Gulli | |
| 2013 | The Secret Life of Walter Mitty | Helicopter pilot | |
| 2014 | A Walk Among the Tombstones | Jonas Loogan | |
| 2015 | The Last Witch Hunter | Belial | |
| 2016 | Zoolander 2 | Hasidic man | |
| 2016 | The BFG | the Maidmasher | |
| 2016 | The White King | Pickaxe | |
| 2018 | The Spy Who Dumped Me | Finnish backpacker | |
| 2018 | The Meg | The Wall | |
| 2018 | Let Me Fall | Viðskiptavinur | |
| 2018 | The Vanishing | Boor | |
| 2018 | Fantastic Beasts: The Crimes of Grindelwald | Skender | |
| 2019 | How to Train Your Dragon: The Hidden World | Ragnar the Rock | Voice role |
| 2019 | Murder Mystery | Sergei | |
| 2019 | End of Sentence | Officer Stone | |
| 2020 | Eurovision Song Contest: The Story of Fire Saga | Neils Brongus | |
| 2023 | Operation Napoleon | Einar | |
| 2026 | Wildwood | Seamus | Voice role |
| 2026 | Hidden People | Sig | |
| 2027 | Blood on Snow † | TBA | Post-production |
| 2027 | How to Train Your Dragon 2 † | Drago Bludvist | Filming |

=== Television ===
List of television appearances, with year, title, and role shown
| Year | Title | Role | Notes |
|---|---|---|---|
| 2006 | The Eagle | Computer thief | 1 episode |
| 2009 | 1066 The Battle for Middle Earth | Gyrd | 1 episode |
| 2009 | Fangavaktin | Loðfíllinn | 7 episodes |
| 2014 | Banshee | Jonah Lambrecht | 2 episodes |
| 2014 | True Detective | Dewall | 1 episode |
| 2014 | Banshee Origins | Jonah Lambrecht | 1 episode |
| 2015–21 | Trapped | Andri Ólafsson | 21 episodes |
| 2016 | The Missing | Stefan Andersen | 4 episodes |
| 2016 | Quarry | Credence Mason | 4 episodes |
| 2016–17 | Lady Dynamite | Scott Marvel Cassidy | 13 episodes |
| 2017 | Emerald City | Ojo | 7 episodes |
| 2018 | Hilda | | 13 episodes |
| 2019 | The Widow | Ariel Helgason | 8 episodes |
| 2019 | New Amsterdam | Burl | 1 episode |
| 2019 | The Dark Crystal: Age of Resistance | The Archer (voice) | 6 episodes |
| 2019-2020 | NOS4A2 | Bing Partridge | 20 episodes |
| 2020 | Cursed | Rugen the Leper King | 1 episode |
| 2020 | The Minister | Benedikt Ríkharðsson | 8 episodes |
| 2021 | Vegferð | Ólafur Darri | 6 episodes |
| 2022 | The Amazing Race 34 | Himself | 1 episode |
| 2022–24 | The Tourist | Billy Nixon | 6 episodes |
| 2022–24 | Monster High | Foxford (voice) | Recurring role |
| 2023 | Boat Story | Narrator | 6 episodes |
| 2023–25 | Kiff | Centaur Claus (voice) | 2 episodes |
| 2024 | Twilight of the Gods | Tiwaz (voice) | 5 episodes |
| 2024 | Somebody Somewhere | Víglundur 'Iceland' Hjartarson | Season 3 |
| 2024 | La Palma | Haukur | 3 episodes |
| 2025 | Severance | Mr. Drummond | Recurring role; 6 episodes (season 2) |
| 2025 | Nine Bodies in a Mexican Morgue | Travis Davies | Main role |
| 2025 | Your Friends & Neighbors | Christian Tómasson | 3 episodes |
| TBA | Reykjavik Fusion † | Jónas | Lead role |
| TBA | 12 12 12 † | TBA | Upcoming series |
| TBA | God of War † | Thor | Upcoming series |

=== Video games ===
List of video game appearances, with year, title, and role shown
| Year | Title | Role | Notes |
|---|---|---|---|
| 2017 | For Honor | Highlander | Voice role |
| 2023 | The Last Worker | Kurt | Voice role |

== Awards and nominations ==
| Year | Award | Category | Nominated work | Result |
|---|---|---|---|---|
| 2006 | Edda Awards | Screenplay of the Year (with Gísli Örn Garðarsson, Nína Dögg Filippusdóttir & Ragnar Bragason) | Children | Won |
| 2006 | Edda Awards | Actor of the Year | Children | Nominated |
| 2007 | Edda Awards | Best Film (with Nanna Kristín Magnúsdóttir, Ingvar Sigurdsson, Víkingur Kristjánsson, Gísli Örn Garðarsson, Nína Dögg Filippusdóttir & Ragnar Bragason) | Parents | Won |
| 2007 | Nordic Council Film Prize | —N/a | Children | Nominated |
| 2010 | Edda Awards | Supporting Actor of the Year | The Prison Shift | Nominated |
| 2011 | Edda Awards | Actor of the Year | Stormland | Won |
| 2011 | Edda Awards | Screenplay of the Year (with Ottó Geir Borg, Víkingur Kristjánsson Ólafur Egilsson, Gísli Örn Garðarsson, Nína Dögg Filippusdóttir, Ingvar Sigurdsson, Nanna Kristín Magnúsdóttir & Árni Ólafur Ásgeirsson) | Undercurrent | Nominated |
| 2013 | Edda Awards | Actor of the Year | The Deep | Won |
| 2013 | Karlovy Vary International Film Festival | Best Actor Award | XL | Won |
| 2014 | Edda Awards | Actor of the Year | XL | Nominated |
| 2021 | Edda Awards | Actor of the Year | The Minister | Won |
| 2022 | Edda Awards | Actor of the Year | Vegferð | Nominated |
| 2023 | Edda Awards | Supporting Actor of the Year | Operation Napoleon | Nominated |
| 2024 | Nordic Council Film Prize | Best Film (with Baltasar Kormákur & Agnes Johansen) | Touch | Nominated |
