= Febiofest =

Czech film festival

Prague International Film Festival (Febiofest)
- Location: Prague, Czech Republic
- Founded: 1993
- Disestablished: 2022
- No. of films: 190 (2013)
- Website: www.febiofest.cz/en

The Prague International Film Festival (Czech: Mezinárodní filmový festival Praha), also known as Febiofest, was a film festival in the Czech Republic. It presented a wide spectrum of contemporary and retrospective examples of high-quality film including alternative, film-school and amateur works to a diverse viewing public.

== History ==
The festival was founded in December 1993 in Prague by movie and television company Febiofest. The main personalities of the foundation were Fero Fenič and Pavel Melounek. Originally taking place in one city (Prague) in two small theaters, the event gradually grew (in just ten years) into more than 140,000 viewers in two countries, 12 cities and nearly 43 theaters. In 2005 the festival presented 336 films from 65 countries. The main part of festival was still held in Prague in 2017, but when the festival in Prague ended, some films were shown in other cities. It was announced on 10 March 2020 that the 2020 edition would be cancelled because of the ongoing COVID-19 pandemic. Fero Fenič announced in 2022 that he was looking for a new owner, and that the festival would not be held in 2023. In November 2023, Fenič filed for bankruptcy.

== Guests ==
In 20 years, Febiofest has hosted directors and actors such as Nanni Moretti, Claude Lelouch, Geraldine Chaplin, Gaspar Noé, Peter Weir, Olivier Assayas, Roman Polanski, Volker Schloendorff, Isztvan Szabo, Tsai Ming-Liang, Tom Tykwer, Hal Hartley, Andrey Konchalovski, Armin Mueller Stahl, Nikita Mikhalkov, Carlos Saura or Claudia Cardinale.

== Award ==
Grand Prix of the festival is dedicated to debuting European filmmakers in New Europe section. Award started in 2008. The 33-member jury awarding the Grand Prix consists of applicants from 15 to 100 years old, to people of all education, social background, professions, and interests plus honorary chairman such as D.O.P. Miroslav Ondricek, Neo-Futurist architect Jan Kaplický, artist David Cerny, conductor Libor Pesek, and former First Lady Dagmar Havlova.

Awarded Films:

Grand Prix
Year	Film title	Director	Country of origin
2008	Magnus	Kadri Kõusaar	Estonia, United Kingdom
2009	Snow	Aida Begić	Bosnia and Herzegovina, Germany, France, Iran
2010	The Children of Diyarbakir	Miraz Bezar	Turkey
2011	The Christening	Marcin Wrona	Poland
2012	The Good Son	Zaida Bergoth	Finland
2013	Broken	Rufus Norris	United Kingdom
2014	Home	Maximilian Hult	Sweden, Iceland
2015	Life in a Fishbowl	Baldvin Zophoníasson	Iceland
2016	Sparrows	Rúnar Rúnarsson	Iceland, Denmark, Croatia
2017	Heartstone	Guðmundur Arnar Guðmundsson	Iceland

Kristián Award for Contribution to the World Cinema was formerly given to personalities such as Roman Polanski, Helmut Berger, Richard Lester, Claudia Cardinale, Charles Aznavour, Carlos Saura, Daniel Olbrychski, Otar Ioseliani, Wim Wenders and Mike Leigh.

The annual award 1995-2011 was the Kristián (Czech critic's prizes). It focused attention not only on Czech feature films, but on animated and documentary works. The prize was made by famous sculptor Olbram Zoubek.

== Venue ==
- Czech Republic
  - Prague
  - Ostrava
  - Brno
  - Liberec
  - Pardubice
- Slovakia
  - Bratislava
  - Košice
  - Nitra
  - Žilina
  - Prešov
  - Martin
  - Banská Bystrica

== See also ==
- List of film festivals in the Czech Republic
