= Shooting Stars Award =

European film award

The Shooting Stars Awards are presented annually by the pan-European network organization European Film Promotion (EFP) to emerging actors from Europe. "Shooting Stars" is an initiative of the EFP for the international promotion and networking of promising up-and-coming actors from the 37 EFP member countries. Since 1998, ten talents selected from all over Europe have been presented each year during the Berlin International Film Festival (Berlinale) to the international press, the general public, and the film industry. The four-day programme culminates with the presentation of the European Shooting Stars Awards.

== Selection and programme ==
The EFP member organisations from a total of 37 European countries can each nominate one actor/actress aged between 18 and 32, who has been successful and already won awards in their native country.

An independent international expert jury selects the 10 best and internationally most promising talents to then be presented at the Berlinale to international casting directors, agencies, directors, producers as well as the international press and the general public and to also receive the European Shooting Star Award at the end of the programme.

== Award winners ==
Up until 2018, a total of 170 actresses and 133 actors had been presented at the Berlinale and received awards as European Shooting Stars, including the now internationally known actors Rachel Weisz (UK 1998), Franka Potente (Germany 1998), Daniel Craig (UK 2000), August Diehl (Germany 2000), Nina Hoss (Germany 2000), Thure Lindhardt (Denmark 2000), Heike Makatsch (Germany 2001), Ludivine Sagnier (France 2001), Jérémie Renier (Belgium 2002), Daniel Brühl (Germany 2003), Nikolaj Lie Kaas (Denmark 2003), Matthias Schoenaerts (Belgium 2003), Andrew Scott (Ireland 2004), Ruth Negga (Ireland 2006), Mélanie Laurent (France 2007), Carey Mulligan (UK 2009), Pilou Asbaek (Denmark 2011), Alicia Vikander (Sweden 2011), Riz Ahmed (UK 2012), Carla Juri (Switzerland 2013), George MacKay (UK 2014) and Maisie Williams (UK 2015).

=== 1990s ===
Year	Honourees	Jury
1998	Beatriz Batarda (Portugal); Juan Diego Botto (Spain); Clotilde Courau (France); Fritz Karl (Austria); Sabrina Leurquin (Belgium); Victor Löw (The Netherlands); Labina Mitevska (United Kingdom); Michaël Pas (Belgium); Franka Potente (Germany); Melvil Poupaud (France); Ingrid Rubio (Spain); Lars Simonsen (Denmark); Jürgen Vogel (Germany); Vicky Volioti (Greece); Anneke von der Lippe (Norway); Rachel Weisz (United Kingdom)	
1999	Moritz Bleibtreu (Germany); Mathieu Demy (France); Soraya Gomaa (Switzerland); Renos Haralambidis (Greece); Iben Hjejle (Denmark); Diogo Infante (Portugal); Kelly Macdonald (United Kingdom); Ana Moreira (Portugal); Eduardo Noriega (Spain); Paul Ronan (Ireland); Christian Schmidt (Austria); Maria Schrader (Germany); Rachael Stirling (United Kingdom); Alexia Stresi (France); Ingvar Eggert Sigurdsson (Iceland); Tamar van den Dop (The Netherlands); Leonor Watling (Spain); Johan Widerberg (Sweden)	

=== 2000s ===
Year	Honourees	Jury
2000	Antoine Chappey (France); Daniel Craig (United Kingdom); August Diehl (Germany); Caroline Ducey (France); Rita Durão (Portugal); Hilmir Snær Guðnason (Iceland); Nina Hoss (Germany); Nadja Hüpscher (The Netherlands); Thure Lindhardt (Denmark); Fele Martínez (Spain); Myriam Muller (Luxembourg); Francisco Nascimento (Portugal); Photini Papadodima (Greece); Nina Proll (Austria); Alexandra Rapaport (Sweden); Martin Rapold (Switzerland); Maya Sansa (Italy); Natalia Verbeke (Spain)	
2001	Stefano Accorsi (Italy); Kate Ashfield (United Kingdom); Eloy Azorin (Spain); Elaine Cassidy (Ireland); Anne-Shlomit Deonna (Switzerland); Benno Fürmann (Germany); Mickey Hardt (Luxembourg); Ann Eleonora Jørgensen (Denmark); Baltasar Kormákur (Iceland); Heike Makatsch (Germany); Gørild Mauseth (Norway); Birgit Minichmayr (Austria); Evelina Papoulia (Greece); Filip Peeters (Belgium); Alexandre Pinto (Portugal); Ludivine Sagnier (France); Aylin Yay (Belgium); Malik Zidi (France)	
2002	Enrique Alcides (Spain); Carla Bolito (Portugal); Maria Bonnevie (Norway); Rachida Brakni (France); Luc Feit (Luxembourg); Michael Finger (Switzerland); Fabrizio Gifuni (Italy); Lindsey Harris (Ireland); Marcell Miklós (Hungary); Tuva Novotny (Sweden); Jérémie Renier (Belgium); Maria Würgler Rich (Denmark); Lucy Russell (United Kingdom); Fedja van Huêt (The Netherlands); Margrét Vilhjálmsdóttir (Iceland); Antonio Wannek (Germany)	
2003	Leonor Baldaque (France); Daniel Brühl (Germany); Cécile de France (Belgium); Libero de Rienzo (Italy); Nína Dögg Filippusdóttir (Iceland); Minna Haapkylä (Finland); Maria Hofstätter (Austria); Kristoffer Joner (Norway); Nikolaj Lie Kaas (Denmark); Marilita Lambropoulou (Greece); Flora Montgomery (Ireland); Szonja Oroszlán (Hungary); Torkel Petersson (Sweden); Mona Petri (Switzerland); Matthias Schoenaerts (Belgium); Daan Schuurmans (The Netherlands); Jamie Sives (United Kingdom); Goya Toledo (Spain); Tatiana Vilhelmová (Czech Republic)	
2004	Alexandra Aidini (Greece); Elena Anaya (Spain); Lubna Azabal (France); Eva Birthistle (United Kingdom); Irina Björklund (Finland); Zoé Félix (France); Georg Friedrich (Austria); Anna Geislerová (Czech Republic); Aksel Hennie (Norway); Michael Koch (Switzerland); Tom Leick (Luxembourg); Tómas Lemarquis (Iceland); Kristine Nevarauska (Latvia); Filippo Nigro (Italy); Eszter Ónodi (Hungary); Thekla Reuten (The Netherlands); Sonja Richter (Denmark); Andrew Scott (Ireland); Maria Simon (Germany); Ângelo Torres (Portugal); Andreas Wilson (Sweden)	
2005	Aleksandra Balmazović (Slovenia); Johanna Bantzer (Switzerland); Jan Budař (Czech Republic); Jakob Cedergren (Denmark); Marisa Cruz (Portugal); Sara Forestier (France); Dorka Gryllus (Hungary); Frida Hallgren (Sweden); Monic Hendrickx (Netherlands); Mark O'Halloran (Ireland); Giorgio Pasotti (Italy); Max Riemelt (Germany); Trond Espen Seim (Norway); Kari-Pekka Toivonen (Finland); Unax Ugalde (Spain)	
2006	Beate Bille (Denmark); Marta Etura (Spain); Gabriella Hámori (Hungary); Bjorn Hlynur Haraldsson (Iceland); Maarja Jakobson (Estonia); Vesela Kazakova (Bulgaria); Iva Krajnc (Slovenia); Carlos Leal (Switzerland); Pavel Liška (Czech Republic); Nuno Lopes (Portugal); Christos Loulis (Greece); Ruth Negga (Ireland); Mimoun Oaïssa (The Netherlands); Jasper Pääkkönen (Finland); Lucy Punch (United Kingdom); Kathrin Resetarits (Austria); Eva Röse (Sweden); Riccardo Scamarcio (Italy); Ane Dahl Torp (Norway); Fanny Valette (France); Johanna Wokalek (Germany)	
2007	Nils Althaus (Switzerland); Nicolai Cleve Broch (Norway); Maximilian Brückner (Germany); Pádraic Delaney (Ireland); David Dencik (Denmark); Kate Dickie (United Kingdom); Tommi Eronen (Finland); Gísli Örn Garðarsson (Iceland); Agnieszka Grochowska (Poland); Klára Issová (Czech Republic); Óscar Jaenada (Spain); Kevin Janssens (Belgium); Mélanie Laurent (France); Marko Mandić (Slovenia); Péter Nagy (Hungary); Táňa Pauhofová (Slovakia); Afonso Pimentel (Portugal); Maria Popistașu (Romania); Halina Reijn (The Netherlands); Sabrina Reiter (Austria); Gustaf Skarsgård (Sweden); Rain Tolk (Estonia); Jasmine Trinca (Italy); Panayota Vladi (Greece); Jules Werner (Luxembourg)	
2008	Joel Basman (Switzerland); Nicolas Cazalé (France); Stine Fischer Christensen (Denmark); Elio Germano (Italy); Maryam Hassouni (The Netherlands); Hannah Herzsprung (Germany); Marko Igonda (Slovakia); Anamaria Marinca (Romania); Zsolt Nagy (Hungary)	Michael Ballhaus (Germany); Beatrice Kruger (Italy); Derek Power (United States); Lucy Russell (United Kingdom); Vibeke Windeløv (Denmark)
2009	Sarah Bolger (Ireland); Céline Bolomey (Switzerland); Verónica Echegui (Spain); Hafsia Herzi (France); David Kross (Germany); Cyron Melville (Denmark); Carey Mulligan (United Kingdom); Alba Rohrwacher (Italy); Orsi Tóth (Hungary); Samuli Vauramo (Finland)	Peter Cowie (United Kingdom); Marion Hänsel (Belgium); Labina Mitevska (North Macedonia); Antonio Saura (Spain); Patrícia Vasconcelos (Portugal)

=== 2010s ===
Year	Honorees	Jury
2010	Dragoș Bucur (Romania); Agata Buzek (Poland); Anders Baasmo Christiansen (Norway); Zrinka Cvitešić (Croatia); Anaïs Demoustier (France); Kryštof Hádek (Czech Republic); Edward Hogg (United Kingdom); Michele Riondino (Italy); Lotte Verbeek (The Netherlands); Pihla Viitala (Finland)	Anna Geislerová (Czech Republic); Giuseppe Piccioni (Italy); Karl Baumgartner (Germany); Leo Davis (United Kingdom); Steven Gaydos (United States)
2011	Pilou Asbæk (Denmark); Alexander Fehling (Germany); Domhnall Gleeson (Ireland); Sylvia Hoeks (The Netherlands); Clara Lago (Spain); Natasha Petrovic (North Macedonia); Andrea Riseborough (United Kingdom); Marija Škaričić (Croatia); Alicia Vikander (Sweden); Nik Xhelilaj (Albania)	Heike Makatsch (Germany); Ole Christian Madsen (Denmark); Cédomir Kolar (France); Lina Todd (United States); Derek Elley (United Kingdom)
2012	Riz Ahmed (United Kingdom); Antonia Campbell-Hughes (Ireland); Jakub Gierszał (Poland); Hilmar Guðjónsson (Iceland); Adèle Haenel (France); Max Hubacher (Switzerland); Anna Maria Mühe (Germany); Isabella Ragonese (Italy); Bill Skarsgård (Sweden); Ana Ularu (Romania)	Simone Bär (Germany); Marleen Gorris (The Netherlands); Thure Lindhardt (Denmark); Matt Mueller (United Kingdom); Ada Solomon (Romania)
2013	Laura Birn (Finland); Ada Condeescu (Romania); Arta Dobroshi (Republic of Kosovo); Mikkel Boe Følsgaard (Denmark); Jure Henigman (Slovenia); Carla Juri (Switzerland); Nermina Lukač (Sweden); Luca Marinelli (Italy); Saskia Rosendahl (Germany); Christa Théret (France)	Bettina Brokemper (Germany); Thierry Chèze (France); Jina Jay (United Kingdom); Alba Rohrwacher (Italy); Jasmila Žbanić (Bosnia & Herzegovina)
2014	Danica Curcic (Denmark); Maria Dragus (Germany); Miriam Karlkvist (Italy); Marwan Kenzari (The Netherlands); Jakob Oftebro (Norway); Mateusz Kościukiewicz (Poland); George MacKay (United Kingdom); Edda Magnason (Sweden); Nikola Rakočević (Serbia); Cosmina Stratan (Romania)	Anders Baasmo Christiansen (Norway); Charles Gant (United Kingdom); Hermine Huntgeburth (Germany); Oriana Kunčić (Croatia); Jani Thiltges (Luxembourg)
2015	Natalia de Molina (Spain); Aistė Diržiūtė (Lithuania); Joachim Fjelstrup (Denmark); Hera Hilmar (Iceland); Abbey Hoes (The Netherlands); Jannis Niewöhner (Germany); Moe Dunford (Ireland); Emmi Parviainen (Finland); Sven Schelker (Switzerland); Maisie Williams (United Kingdom)	Nathalie Cheron (France); Danijel Hočevar (Slovenia); Eva Röse (Sweden); Malgorzata Szumowska (Poland); Damon Wise (United Kingdom)
2016	Martha Canga Antonio (Belgium); Atli Óskar Fjalarsson (Iceland); Jella Haase (Germany); Kacey Mottet Klein (Switzerland); Tihana Lazović (Croatia); Lou de Laâge (France); Daphné Patakia (Greece); Sara Serraiocco (Italy); María Valverde (Spain); Reinout Scholten van Aschat (The Netherlands)	Anamaria Marinca (Romania); Marta Donzelli (Italy); Constantine Giannaris (Greece); Tobias Kniebe (Germany); Rie Hedegaard (Denmark)
2017	Alessandro Borghi (Italy); Victoria Guerra (Portugal); Hannah Hoekstra (Netherlands); Louis Hofmann (Germany); Tudor Aaron Istodor (Romania); Karin Franz Körlof (Sweden); Maruša Majer (Slovenia); Esben Smed (Denmark); Elīna Vaska (Latvia); Zofia Wichłacz (Poland)	Dorka Gryllus (Hungary); Lucinda Syson (United Kingdom); Pandora da Cunha Telles (Portugal); Xavier Koller (Switzerland); Jan Lumholdt (Sweden)
2018	Alba August (Sweden); Michaela Coel (United Kingdom); Matilda De Angelis (Italy); Eili Harboe (Norway); Irakli Kvirikadze (Georgia); Franz Rogowski (Germany); Matteo Simoni (Belgium); Jonas Smulders (The Netherlands); Reka Tenki (Hungary); Luna Wedler (Switzerland)	Mijke de Jong (The Netherlands); Ankica Juric Tilic (Croatia); Nicole Schmied (Austria); Eduardo Noriega (Spain); Mode Steinkjer (Norway)
2019	Emma Drogunova (Germany); Ardalan Esmaili (Sweden); Aisling Franciosi (Ireland); Kristin Thora Haraldsdóttir (Iceland); Elliott Crosset Hove (Denmark); Rea Lest-Liik (Estonia); Milan Marić (Serbia); Dawid Ogrodnik (Poland); Blagoj Veselinov (North Macedonia); Ine Marie Wilmann (Norway)	Avy Kaufman (USA); Ingvar Sigurdsson (Iceland); Macdara Kelleher (Ireland); Tara Karajica (Serbia); Teona Strugar Mitevska (North Macedonia)

=== 2020s ===
Year	Honorees	Jury
2020	Martina Apostolova (Bulgaria); Bartosz Bielenia (Poland); Jonas Dassler (Germany); Levan Gelbakhiani (Georgia); Zita Hanrot (France); Pääru Oja (Estonia); Joana Ribeiro (Portugal); Ella Rumpf (Switzerland); Victoria Carmen Sonne (Denmark); Bilal Wahib (The Netherlands)	Dome Karukoski (Finland); Katarína Krnáčová (Slovakia); Luvy Bevan (United Kingdom); Rüdiger Sturm (Germany); Vesela Kazakova (Bulgaria)
2021	Alba Baptista (Portugal); Seidi Haarla (Finland); Žygimantė Elena Jakštaitė (Lithuania); Sara Klimoska (North Macedonia); Nicolas Maury (France); Fionn O'Shea (Ireland); Albrecht Schuch (Germany); Natasa Stork (Hungary); Martijn Lakemeier (The Netherlands); Gustav Lindh (Sweden)	
2022	Evin Ahmad (Sweden); Clare Dunne (Ireland); Gracija Filipović (Croatia); João Nunes Monteiro (Portugal); Marie Reuther (Denmark); Emilio Sakraya (Germany); Timon Sturbej (Slovenia); Hanna van Vliet (Netherlands); Anamaria Vartolomei (France); Souheila Yacoub (Switzerland)	
2023	Leonie Benesch (Germany); Gizem Erdogan (Sweden); Yannick Jozefzoon (The Netherlands); Kayije Kagame (Switzerland); Thorvaldur Kristjansson (Iceland); Joely Mbundu (Belgium); Benedetta Porcaroli (Italy); Judith State (Romania); Kristine Kujath Thorp (Norway); Alina Tomnikov (Finland)	
2024	Asta Kamma August (Sweden); Valentina Bellè (Italy); Suzy Bemba (France); Salome Demuria (Georgia); Thibaud Dooms (Belgium); Džiugas Grinys (Lithuania); Éanna Hardwicke (Ireland); Katharina Stark (Germany); Margarita Stoykova (Bulgaria); Kamila Urzędowska (Poland)	
2025	Kārlis Arnolds Avots (Latvia); Frida Gustavsson (Sweden); Elín Hall (Iceland); Lidija Kordić (Montenegro); Devrim Lingnau (Germany); Maarja Johanna Mägi (Estonia); Marina Makris (Cyprus); Vicente Wallenstein (Portugal); Besir Zeciri (Denmark); Šarūnas Zenkevičius (Lithuania)	Ludivine Sagnier (France); Radu Muntean (Romania); Amel Soudani (Switzerland); Vuk Perović (Montenegro); Pauline Hanson (Sweden)
2026	Fatlume Bunjaku (Albania); Lucas Englander (Austria); Violet Braeckman (Belgium); Salif Cissé (France); Enno Trebs (Germany); Danielle Galligan (Ireland); Tecla Insolia (Italy); Joes Brauers (The Netherlands); Sofia Tjelta Sydness (Norway); Cleo Diára (Portugal)	Danis Tanović (Bosnia and Herzegovina); Danica Curcic (Denmark); Jacques-Henri Bronckart (Belgium); Jo Monteiro (Portugal); Leila Latif (Sudan / United Kingdom)

=== Awards by nation ===
As of 2026.

Submitting country	Number of honorees
Germany	32
France	27
Netherlands	22
Denmark	21
Italy	20
Sweden	20
Switzerland	19
United Kingdom	18
Ireland	17
Portugal	17
Spain	17
Iceland	14
Norway	14
Belgium	13
Finland	11
Hungary	10
Austria	9
Greece	9
Poland	8
Romania	8
Czech Republic	6
Slovenia	6
Estonia	5
Luxembourg	5
Croatia	4
Lithuania	4
Bulgaria	3
Latvia	3
North Macedonia	3
Albania	2
Serbia	2
Slovakia	2
Cyprus	1
Kosovo	1
Montenegro	1

== Partners ==
The European Shooting Stars is supported by the participating EFP member organisations, the Creative Europe MEDIA Programme of the European Union as well as by other cooperation partners and sponsors.
