= Aldís Amah Hamilton =

Icelandic actress

- Born: 1991 (age 33–34); Germany
- Occupation: Actress
- Years active: 2017–present
- Parent: Alda Sigmundsdóttir (mother)

Aldís Amah Hamilton (born 1991) is an Icelandic actress. She is known for playing the lead role in the 2021 TV crime drama series Black Sands. For her role as Ástríðr in the 2024 video game Senua's Saga: Hellblade II, Hamilton was nominated for the British Academy Games Award for Performer in a Supporting Role.

== Early life and education ==
Aldís Amah Hamilton was born in 1991 in Germany to an Icelandic author and journalist Alda Sigmundsdóttir and an American father who were working there as English teachers. She moved with her mother to Iceland at the age of three and grew up in Vesturbær.

She graduated from the Iceland University of the Arts in 2016.

== Career ==
Aldís is an Icelandic actress.

During her studies in 2016, she appeared as Desdemona in the Vesturport's performance of Othello in the National Theatre of Iceland.

In 2020, Aldís appeared in the Netflix's Icelandic original series Katla, directed by Baltasar Kormákur.

In 2021 it was announced that she had been cast as the lead actress of the TV series Black Sands, directed by Baldvin Zophoníasson, where she plays the character of Aníta.

In 2025, she appears as the lead character Ryn in the video game Echoes of the End.

== Recognition ==
On the Icelandic National Day in 2019, Aldís was named Reykjavík's Lady of the Mountain.

== Filmography ==
=== Films ===
Year	Title	Role
2018	Vargur	Sandra
2021	Harmur	Freyja
2024	The Christmas Quest	Karlotta

=== TV shows ===
Year	Title	Role
2017	Fangar	Natalie
2017	Loforð	Dagný
2020	The Valhalla Murders	Dísa
2020	Eurogarðurinn	Hanna
2021	Vegferð	Lovísa
2021	Katla	Eyja
2021	Black Sands	Aníta
2022	Vitjanir	Rósa
2024	Útilega	Gunna

=== Video games ===
Year	Title	Role
2024	Senua's Saga: Hellblade II	Ástríðr
2025	Echoes of the End	Ryn
