= Þórunn Arna Kristjánsdóttir =

Icelandic actress and singer (born 1983)

- Born: 1983 (age 42–43); Ísafjörður, Iceland
- Citizenship: Icelandic
- Education: Iceland University of the Arts
- Occupations: Actress; singer
- Known for: Vegferð

Þórunn Arna Kristjánsdóttir (born 1983) is an Icelandic actress and singer. A prominent stage actress, she appeared as Sophie in Reykjavík City Theatre performance of the Mamma Mia! musical. In 2014, she appeared in the TV show Ævar vísindamaður and in 2021, she appeared as a fictional version of herself in the comedy series Vegferð.

== Early life ==
Þórunn was born and raised in Ísafjörður where she attended Menntaskólinn á Ísafirði. In 2006, she graduated from the Iceland University of the Arts.

== Filmography ==
Film
Year	Title	Role	Notes
2013	Metalhead	Elsa	
2015	Blóðberg	Sunna	

Television
Year	Title	Role	Notes
2014	Ævar vísindamaður	Mary Shelley / Caroline Herchel / Marie Curie	3 episodes
2021	Vegferð	Þórunn Arna	3 episodes
2022	Blackport	District Commissioner representative	1 episode
