= Children (2006 film) =

2006 Icelandic film by Ragnar Bragason

- Directed by: Ragnar Bragason
- Written by: Ragnar Bragason; Vesturport
- Produced by: Vesturport
- Starring: Gísli Örn Garðarsson; Nína Dögg Filippusdóttir; Ólafur Darri Ólafsson; Andri Snær Helgason; Hanna María Karlsdóttir
- Release date: 2006
- Country: Iceland
- Language: Icelandic

Children (Icelandic: Börn) is a 2006 Icelandic film. Highly acclaimed, the film won several Edda Awards, and was also submitted as Iceland's official entry to the Academy Awards foreign film section. The film is set in the Breiðholt suburb of Reykjavík, and portrays a grittiness in stark contrast to the tourist-friendly portrayal of the Icelandic capital.

The sequel Parents was released in 2007.

== Plot ==
The plot centers around single nurse Karítas (Nína Dögg Filippusdóttir), her son, Guðmundur (Andri Snær Helgason), who only plays with a schizophrenic family friend, Marino (Ólafur Darri Ólafsson), and criminal father Garðar (Gísli Örn Garðarsson) and his conflicts which led to the near death beating of twin brother Georg.

Karítas lives in a housing project in Fell (Upper-Breiðholt), Reykjavík and is struggling to take care of her children with her ex-husband trying to take custody of her kids. Garðar (Gísli Örn Garðarsson), who is struggling to wanting to change from his criminal life lives in Lower-Breiðholt and decides it's time to try and connect with his son. But, when he tries to change he realizes it can be harder than he thinks.

== Cast ==
- Nína Dögg Filippusdóttir as Karítas
- Andri Snær Helgason as Guðmundur
- Ólafur Darri Ólafsson as Marino
- Gísli Örn Garðarsson as Garðar
