= Undercurrent (2010 film) =

Icelandic drama film

- Theatrical poster
- Icelandic: Brim
- Directed by: Árni Ólafur Ásgeirsson
- Written by: Árni Ólafur Ásgeirsson; Ottó Geir Borg; Ólafur Egilsson
- Based on: Brim; 2004 play by Jón Atli Jónasson
- Produced by: Grímar Jónsson; Skúli Fr. Malmquist; Þór Sigurjónsson; Executive: Gísli Örn Garðarsson
- Starring: Gísli Örn Garðarsson; Nína Dögg Filippusdóttir; Ingvar E. Sigurðsson; Ólafur Darri Ólafsson; Ólafur Egilsson; Björn Hlynur Haraldsson; Víkingur Kristjánsson
- Cinematography: Magni Ágústsson
- Edited by: Valdís Óskarsdóttir; Eva Lind Höskuldsdóttir
- Music by: Slowblow
- Production company: Zik Zak Filmworks
- Release date: 5 September 2010
- Running time: 95 minutes
- Country: Iceland
- Language: Icelandic
- Box office: $101,961

Undercurrent (Icelandic: Brim) is a 2010 Icelandic drama film based on a play by the same name and produced by the theatre group Vesturport. The film won the Best Picture award at the 2011 Edda Awards in Iceland. It tells the story of the crew of a fishing boat, one of whom commits suicide.

== Cast ==
- Ingvar E. Sigurðsson as Skipper Anton
- Nína Dögg Filippusdóttir as Drífa
- Björn Hlynur Haraldsson as Logi
- Gísli Örn Garðarsson as Benni
- Ólafur Darri Ólafsson as Sævar
- Ólafur Egilsson as Kiddi
- Víkingur Kristjánsson as Jón Geir
