= Reykjavik Fusion =

Upcoming Icelandic television series

- Genre: Crime drama
- Screenplay by: Hörður Rúnarsson; Birkir Blær Ingólfsson
- Directed by: Samúel & Gunnar
- Starring: Ólafur Darri Ólafsson; Hera Hilmar
- Country of origin: Iceland
- Original language: Icelandic
- No. of series: 1
- No. of episodes: 6

Production
- Producers: Hörður Rúnarsson; Birkir Blær Ingólfsson; Ólafur Darri Ólafsson; Jonas Margeir Ingólfsson
- Production companies: ACT4; Arte; Wild Sheep Content

Reykjavik Fusion is a 2025 crime thriller television series set in Iceland directed by Samúel & Gunnar and starring Ólafur Darri Ólafsson and Hera Hilmar.

== Premise ==
A chef tries to clear his name after a wrongful imprisonment but gets drawn into more criminality.

== Cast ==
- Ólafur Darri Ólafsson as Jónas, talented chef who recently got out of prison
- Hera Hilmar as Marý
- Þröstur Leó Gunnarsson as Kristján
- Lára Jóhanna Jónsdóttir as Katrín, Jónas ex-wife
- Molly Mitchell as Ellen
- Iðunn Ösp Hlynsdóttir as Rósa
- Guðjón Davíð Karlsson (Gói) as Skúli, Katrín's new husband
- Þorsteinn Gunnarsson as Pálmar Sr., Jónas's father
- Hafþór Agnar Unnarsson (Hafþór Unnars) as Bjartur
- Lea Kristín as Þóra
- Jónas Alfreð Birkisson as Styrmir

== Production ==
The six-part series is created and written by Hörður Rúnarsson and co-created and written by Birkir Blær Ingólfsson. Hörður first had the idea for the series in 2017. It is directed by Icelandic duo Samúel & Gunnar (Samúel Bjarki Pétursson and Gunnar Páll Ólafsson). It is produced by ACT4 and co-produced by Arte in France and Germany. The show is a Síminn Premium Original in Iceland. The series is co-produced by Wild Sheep Content who are also handling distribution. Michelin star-winning chef Þráinn Vigfússon acted as a consultant on the series.

The cast is led by Ólafur Darri Ólafsson and Hera Hilmar and also includes Þröstur Leó Gunnarsson. Filming began in August 2024.
