= Vegferð =

2021 Icelandic comedy mini-series

- Genre: Comedy
- Written by: Víkingur Kristjánsson
- Directed by: Baldvin Zophoníasson
- Starring: Víkingur Kristjánsson; Ólafur Darri Ólafsson
- Country of origin: Iceland
- Original language: Icelandic
- No. of seasons: 1
- No. of episodes: 6

Production
- Executive producers: Víkingur Kristjánsson; Hörður Rúnarsson; Baldvin Zophoníasson; Andri Óttarsson
- Producers: Arnbjörg Hafliðadóttir; Ólafur Darri Ólafsson; Andri Ómarsson
- Cinematography: Ásgrímur Guðbjartsson
- Production company: Glassriver

Original release
- Network: Stöð 2
- Release: 4 April 2021

Vegferð (Journey) is an Icelandic television comedy mini-series developed by Glassriver. It is written by Víkingur Kristjánsson and directed by Baldvin Zophoníasson and premiered on Stöð 2 on 4 April 2021. It is a six-part series that follows fictional versions of friends and actors Ólafur Darri and Víkingur on a road trip through Vestfirðir to reshape their longtime friendship.

== Cast ==
- Víkingur Kristjánsson as Víkingur
- Ólafur Darri Ólafsson as Ólafur Darri
- Þórunn Arna Kristjánsdóttir as herself
- Pétur Ernir Svavarsson
- Pálmi Gestsson as himself
- Þröstur Leó Gunnarsson as himself
- Elfar Logi Hannesson as himself
- Vivian Ólafsdóttir as Billa
- Þorsteinn Gunnarsson as father-in-law
- Helga Vala Helgadóttir
- Nicolas Bro as himself
- Jonas Schmidt as himself
- Aldís Amah Hamilton as Lovísa
