= Stormland (film) =

2011 Icelandic comedy film

- Film poster
- Icelandic: Rokland
- Directed by: Marteinn Thorsson
- Written by: Marteinn Thorsson; Hallgrímur Helgason
- Produced by: Snorri Þórisson
- Starring: Ólafur Darri Ólafsson
- Cinematography: Philip Robertson
- Edited by: Marteinn Thorsson; Valdís Óskarsdóttir
- Music by: Sigtryggur Baldursson
- Production companies: Pegasus Pictures; Tenderlee Motion Pictures Company
- Distributed by: Sambio (Iceland)
- Release date: 14 January 2011
- Running time: 111 minutes
- Country: Iceland
- Language: Icelandic

Stormland (Icelandic: Rokland) is a 2011 Icelandic comedy film directed by Marteinn Thorsson, based on Hallgrímur Helgason's 2005 novel, Rokland.

== Synopsis ==
Stormland tells the story of Böðvar "Böddi" Steingrímsson, an anti-establishment man who hates popular culture and idolizes certain characters from Icelandic sagas. He lives in the small town of Krókur with his overprotective mother, after having spent ten years studying philosophy in Germany. A series of mishaps befalls him as he struggles to adapt to his new life. He finds his mother dead in front of the television, gets fired from his teaching job, has a fight with a local business owner, and is rejected by the woman he loves. He gets another woman pregnant, and after the baby is born, Böddi decides to live with the mother, only to learn that he isn't the father after all. In the end, Böddi kills his brother and takes a doctor hostage at a women's hospital while being interviewed by a TV reporter.

== Cast ==
- Ólafur Darri Ólafsson as Böðvar "Böddi" Steingrímsson
- Hilmir Snær Guðnason as Árni Valur
- Þorsteinn Bachmann as Toni Group
- Jóhann Sigurðarson as Albert
- Þórhallur Sigurðsson as Keli
- Steinn Ármann Magnússon as Manni Volgu
- Elma Lísa Gunnarsdóttir as Dagga
- Lilja Guðrún Þorvaldsdóttir as Aðalbjörg - Dagga's Mother
- Stefán Jónsson as Doctor
- Magnús Ragnarsson as Þóroddur
- Víkingur Kristjánsson as Einar Alberts
- Stefán Hallur Stefánsson as Viddi
