= Country Wedding =

2008 Icelandic film

- Film poster
- Icelandic: Sveitabrúðkaup
- Directed by: Valdís Óskarsdóttir
- Written by: Valdís Óskarsdóttir
- Produced by: Árni Filippusson; Davíð Óskar Ólafsson; Hreinn Beck
- Starring: Ingvar Eggert Sigurðsson; Ólafur Darri Ólafsson; Björn Hlynur Haraldsson
- Cinematography: Anthony Dod Mantle
- Edited by: Valdís Óskarsdóttir
- Music by: The Tiger Lillies
- Production companies: Mystery Productions; Duo Productions; Ave Productions; WhiteRiver Productions
- Distributed by: Sambio (Iceland)
- Release date: 28 August 2008
- Running time: 99 minutes
- Country: Iceland
- Language: Icelandic
- Box office: $199,144

Country Wedding (Icelandic: Sveitabrúðkaup) is an Icelandic film directed by Valdís Óskarsdóttir and released on 28 August 2008. It tells the story of a couple who decide to get married in a countryside church, but things do not go as planned.

== Cast ==
- Ingvar Eggert Sigurðsson as Séra Brynjólfur
- Ólafur Darri Ólafsson as Egill
- Björn Hlynur Haraldsson as Barði
- Ágústa Eva Erlendsdóttir as Auður
- Gísli Örn Garðarsson as Grjóni
- Sigurður Sigurjónsson as Tómas
- Þröstur Leó Gunnarsson as Svanur
- Nína Dögg Filippusdóttir as Lára
- Hanna María Karlsdóttir as Imba
- Árni Pétur Guðjónsson as Stefán
- Kristbjörg Kjeld as Brynhildur
- Theódór Júlíusson as Lúðvík
- Nanna Kristín Magnúsdóttir as Inga
- Víkingur Kristjánsson as Hafsteinn

== Synopsis ==
The story follows a comical ensemble of characters who travel from the Icelandic capital to the countryside for a wedding, with a variety of incidents and dramatic interpersonal interactions besetting them along the way.
