= Mikael Torfason =

Icelandic writer and film director

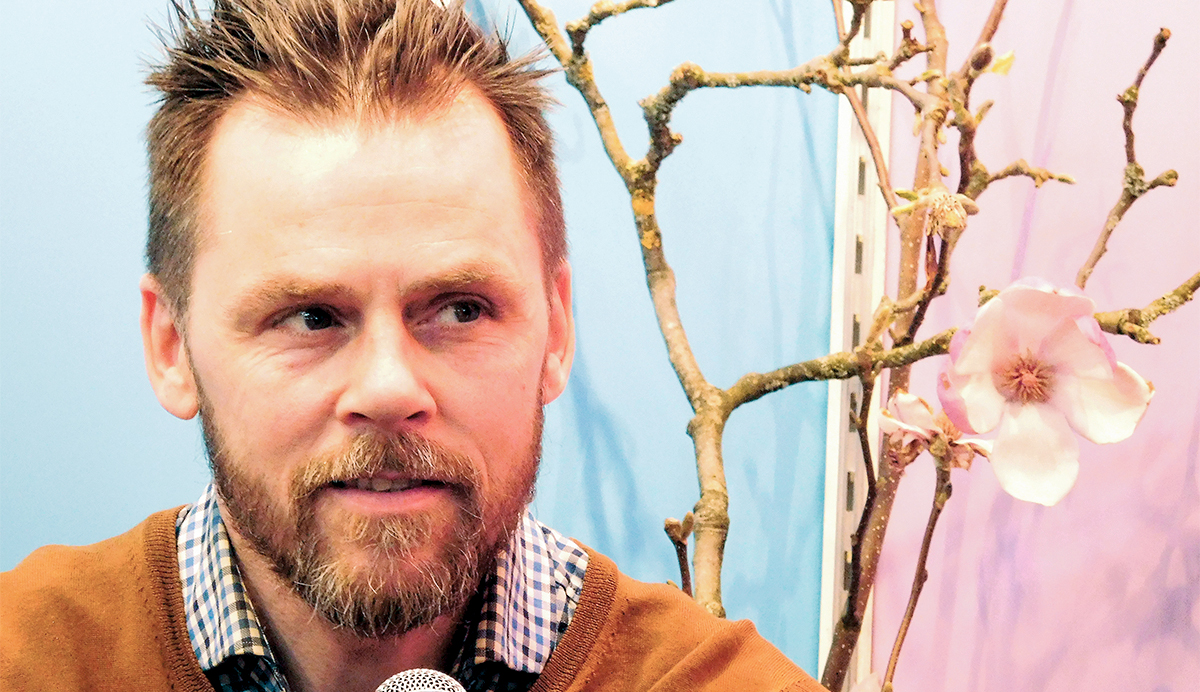
- Mikael Torfason (2018)
- Born: 8 August 1974 (age 51); Reykjavík, Iceland
- Occupations: novelist, playwright, screenwriter, journalist, and director

Mikael Torfason (born 8 August 1974) is an Icelandic novelist, playwright, screenwriter, journalist, and director. He has written seven novels, published in Iceland, Denmark, Finland, Germany and Lithuania. He has also written for film and theatre. In 2002 he directed his first feature film and he has also been editor-in-chief of Iceland's biggest newspapers.

== About ==
Mikael was born in Reykjavík in 1974. He started is journalist career in 1996 as a columnist at Helgarpósturinn. He was as a journalist at Dagblaðið Vísir (DV) and later its editor. Following his stay at DV, he was editor-in-chief at Birtingur and Fréttablaðið. He has written several novels, all published in Iceland and some have traveled in Europe; translated into Germany, Danish, Finnish, Swedish, Lithuanian. Mikael also wrote and directed the feature film Made in Iceland (Gemsar). The film was very well received in Iceland, and traveled the film festival, and got nominated as Best Picture in Scandinavia in 2002.

Lost in Paradise (Týnd í Paradís) is Mikael's latest book. His fourth novel, Samuel, was nominated for The Icelandic Literature Prize and his third novel, The Worlds Stupidest Dad, was nominated for The Nordic Literature Prize in Scandinavia as well as the DV Literature Prize.

Mikael has also written for theatre, and his plays have had great success in Iceland, Norway, Germany and the US. As a journalist he has worked in radio, TV, and been editor-in-chief for two of the three big newspapers in Iceland, as well as being executive director for the largest magazine media company in Iceland.

In 2013, the film Falskur fugl, based on Mikael's first book, premiered in Iceland. He was one of the writers of the drama miniseries Blackport, along with Gísli Örn Garðarsson and Björn Hlynur Haraldsson.

== Bibliography ==
- BRÉF TIL MÖMMU (A LETTER TO MY MOTHER) Memoir – 2019
- SYNDAFALLIÐ (FALL OF MANKIND) Memoir – 2017
- TÝND Í PARADÍS (LOST IN PARADISE) Memoir – 2015
- VORMENN ÍSLANDS (MADE IN ICELAND) Novel – 2009
- SAMÚEL (SAMUEL) Novel – 2002
- HEIMSINS HEIMSKASTI PABBI (WORLD'S DUMBEST DAD) Novel – 2000
- SAGA AF STÚLKU (STORY OF A GIRL) Novel – 1998
- FALSKUR FUGL (BLACK BIRD) Novel – 1997

=== Plays ===
- DIE EDDA* (THE EDDA) - City Theater in Hannover 2018
- GUÐ BLESSI ÍSLAND* (GOD BLESS ICELAND) - City Theater 2017
- ENEMY OF THE DUCK* National Theatre in Oslo 2016
- NJÁLA* (THE STORY OF BURNT NJAL) - City Theater 2015
- SÍÐUSTU DAGAR KJARVALS (KJARVAL'S LAST DAYS) – Radio Theater 2015
- HARMSAGA (TRAGEDY) – Icelandic National Theater 2013
- HINN FULLKOMNI MAÐUR (THE PERFECT MAN) – City Theater 2002
- (written in collaboration with director Thorleifur Orn Arnarsson)

=== Films ===
- Falskur fugl – 2013
- Gemsar – 2002

=== Series ===
- Blackport - 2021-2022 (script)

== Journalism ==
- Editor-in-chief (director of 365 News) – 2013–2014
- Editor-in-chief at Fréttatíminn. A national newspaper in Iceland – 2012
- Editor-in-chief at Birtingur publishing house – 2006–2007
- Project manager at 365 Media Denmark. Starting a new newspaper (Nyhedsavisen) – 2006
- Editor-in-chief at Dagblaðið Vísir, a national newspaper in Iceland – 2003–2006
- Editor-in-chief of Focus, a cultural weekly in Iceland – 1998–2000
