= The Valhalla Murders =

Icelandic television series

- Also known as: Brot
- Genre: Mystery; Thriller; Nordic noir
- Created by: Thordur Palsson
- Country of origin: Iceland
- Original languages: Icelandic; English; German
- No. of seasons: 1
- No. of episodes: 8

Production
- Production locations: Reykjavík, Iceland
- Running time: 50 minutes (approx.)

Original release
- Network: RÚV (Iceland); BBC Four (UK)
- Release: 26 December 2019 – 1 March 2020

The Valhalla Murders (Icelandic: Brot, lit. 'Violation') is an eight-episode police procedural television series created by Thordur Palsson and produced in Iceland, originally airing there in 2019, then released worldwide in 2020 on Netflix and airing for free on BBC Four in the UK.

This is the second Icelandic series to be featured on Netflix as an original series after Trapped (Ófærð)'s third season, Entrapped. The plot is loosely based on a real-life incident. As described in an article on the website MEAWW, "In the late 1940s, an almost similar event took place in remote Iceland. A state-run institution ... housed troubled, young boys, aged between seven and 14, where they were beaten and abused by the staff. Although in reality there was no murder, per se, as shown in the series, it caused quite a noise and the boys were eventually compensated in monetary terms."

== Plot ==
Three former teachers from Valhalla: Þór, Ómar and Brynja, are brutally stabbed to death and mutilated. Valhalla was a State-run home for 12–16 year-old delinquent boys, which closed in 1988. Kata heads the investigation and is joined by Arnar after the Ómar's corpse appeared. They find each victim was sent a 30-year-old photo of Valhalla's residents, which depicts the staff with the boys. Kata's squad researches the boys: many have since committed suicide or been incarcerated. Two survivors, Vidar and Benedikt, relate the systemic physical and emotional abuse by teachers and how nearly every week a boy would be viciously raped in a dark room by an unknown man. That man branded each victim with a heated, hooked knife. The escapee boy, Tommi, is returned to Valhalla by his father Kristján. One night, Tommi attacks his rapist but is murdered. Tommi's corpse is disposed of; the boys and parents are told Tommi had run off.

After Þór and Ómar's corpses, Magnús does not publicly admit any links between them nor links to Valhalla. However, TV news reporter Selma reveals details about the two murders. Kata enlists the help of police chief Hákon from Borgarnes – a town near Valhalla – to find Brynja. State Prosecutor Pétur had written a report on Valhalla, which shows no evidence of abuse. Kata discovers Brynja's corpse in Valhalla. From reading Pétur's report, Kata determines a fourth Valhalla staff member, "Gummi", exists. However, "Gummi" has been attacked and dies. Tracking the photos' sender leads to former boarder Steinþór. Kata and Arnar discover Steinþór has been stabbed by Kristján, who admits to killing the first three staff. Kristján disarms Kata's gun and suicides by shooting himself. Magnús closes the case despite anomalies with "Gummi"'s murder: "Gummi" was drugged, stab wounds were shallow, and Kristján had no files nor photos on "Gummi". To Arnar, this suggests a second killer.

Kata and Hákon begin to suspect Magnús' involvement, when investigating Tommi's recently discovered skeleton. Magnús had doctored a police report on Tommi's disappearance. Arnar initially defends Magnús to Kata. Selma interviews Magnús live on air, and exposes his doctored report. Kata takes her and Hákon's collected evidence to Pétur, hoping to have Magnús arrested. Pétur drugs Kata, disables Magnús and takes Kata's body to a marina. Arnar learns Kata went to Pétur and follows. Arnar is attacked by Pétur, who is knocked down by recovering Kata. Pétur starts strangling Kata, but Arnar crash tackles Pétur and they topple into the sea. Kata rescues Arnar, but Pétur is lost. Pétur is revealed as the Valhalla rapist and murderer of Tommi and "Gummi". Pétur had paid off Þór, Ómar, Brynja and Magnús to hide his activities.

== Cast and characters ==
=== Main cast ===
- Nína Dögg Filippusdóttir as Katrin "Kata" Gunnarsdóttir: Reykjavík police CID detective, aspiring for Chief Superintendent but passed over. Kári's mother, Egill's ex-wife
- Björn Thors as Arnar Böðvarsson: Oslo-based Icelandic expat, detective criminal profiler. Former Jehovah's Witnesses member, Böðvars' son, Laufey's brother
- Sigurður Skúlason as Magnús Sveinsson: Police Commissioner, Kata's boss, formerly Arnar's fosterer
- Tinna Hrafnsdóttir as Helga Bogadóttir: police CID Chief Superintendent, promoted over Kata despite less experience
- Arndís Hrönn Egilsdóttir as Hugrún: forensic analyst on Kata's squad
- Bergur Ebbi as Erlingur: police IT expert on Kata's squad
- Aldís Amah Hamilton as Dísa Geirsdóttir: uniformed police on Kata's squad
- Edda Björgvinsdóttir as Svava: Kata's mother, Kári's grandmother
- Valur Freyr Einarsson as Egill: research scientist, DNA profiler. Kata's ex-husband, Kári's father
- Grettir Valsson as Kári Egillsson: Kata and Egill's 16-year-old son, Hamrahlíð College student, online gamer
- Anna Gunndís Guðmundsdóttir as Selma Hákonardóttir: National Broadcaster's TV news reporter

=== Recurring cast ===
- Ottó Gunnarsson as Tóti: uniformed police on Kata's squad
- Sigurður Sigurjónsson as Pétur Alfreðsson: Iceland's State Prosecutor, prepared whitewashed report on abuses at Valhalla. Magnus' friend
- Víkingur Kristjánsson as Hákon "lögreglumaður" Jensen (English: "policeman"): Borgarnes Police Chief, liaises with Kata to investigate Valhalla
- Ragnheidur Steindórsdóttir as Sigrún
- Damon Younger as Ragnar Ómarsson: murder victim Ómar's son. Historically molested by male rapist
- Sveinn Larus Hjartarsson as Kiddi
- Magnús Ragnarsson as Vilhjálmur
- Þór Tulinius as Kristján Jonasson: Dagny's husband, Valhalla boarder Tommi's father
- Jon Gunnlaugur Halldorsson as Brynja's neighour: Borgarnes resident
- Kristín Þóra Haraldsdóttir as Laufey "Eyja": Jehovah's Witnesses member, Böðvars' daughter, Arnar's long-estranged sister
- Gunnar Jónsson as Viðar: bus driver, former Valhalla boarder
- Stefán Hallur Stefánsson as Steinþór Jonsson: former Valhalla boarder, mailed school photo to murder victims
- Gunnar Hansson as Leifur: Jehovah's Witnesses member, Laufey's husband
- Þorsteinn Bachmann as Helgi: TV news producer, Selma's boss
- Hanna María Karlsdóttir as Elsa: Magnus' wife, formerly Arnar's fosterer
- Ari Matthíasson as Guðmundur "Gummi" Finnbogason: surgeon, former Valhalla staff member
- Guðlaug Ólafsdóttir as Gerður Bardurdóttir: female farmer near Valhalla, witness in Tommi's disappearance

== Episodes ==
No.	Title	Directed by	Written by	Original release date
1	"Never Before Seen"	Þórður Pálsson	Óttar M. Norðfjörð and Mikael Torfason	26 December 2019
Þór Ingimarsson is stabbed to death at Reykjavik Harbour. Veteran police detective Kata is dispatched to investigate, greeting her reporter friend Selma as she arrives at the scene. Þór's lover Íris is arrested as the initial suspect, but the coroner concludes that the stabbing could not have been performed by a woman. Íris says that a masked man was following them all through that night, which is confirmed by surveillance cameras. Later, another man, Ómar Karlsson, is murdered. Both victims have identical stab wounds on their eyes. Police Commissioner Magnús intends to conceal the connection from the public, but Selma reveals the information at a press conference. The police decide to hire an investigator from abroad.
2	"The Return"	Þórður Pálsson	Óttar M. Norðfjörð and Mikael Torfason	2 January 2020
The foreign investigator is Arnar Böðvarsson, an Icelandic expatriate living in Oslo, Norway. Arnar notes that the victims must have known the killer, because there are no defence wounds. An envelope is found in Ómar's safe, containing a photograph of Þór, Ómar, an unknown woman, and a group of teenage boys. Ómar's son Ragnar recognizes the photograph as of the staff and residents of Valhalla, a boys' home near Borgarnes, and identifies the woman as Brynja Þorsteinsdóttir. Hákon Jensen, the Borgarnes police chief, visits Brynja's home and discovers she is missing. Kata searches Valhalla and finds Brynja's body, with similar eye wounds to the other victims.
3	"Valhalla"	Þórður Pálsson	Óttar M. Norðfjörð and Mikael Torfason	9 January 2020
A child at a farm near Valhalla describes a car that passed by on the day of the murder. Kata retrieves a report on all the boys' homes in the country, including Valhalla, from the Ministry of Justice's archives. Pétur Alfreðsson, the state prosecutor who compiled the report, is interviewed about it but doubts that Valhalla is the connection. Arnar finds another copy of the photograph, mailed to Þór shortly before his death. The police begin working to track down all the boys who lived in Valhalla. Kata meets one of them, Vidar Jonsson, who tells of terrible abuses at Valhalla that were not recorded in the report. Vidar mentions that one boy in the photo, Tommi, disappeared. Arnar meets another, Benedikt, who says there was another staff member at Valhalla — Gummi, who took the photograph.
4	"Scars"	Þórður Pálsson	Óttar M. Norðfjörð and Mikael Torfason	16 January 2020
The police track down Gummi, but arrive at his home moments too late to prevent his murder. Selma records a television interview with Vidar and Benedikt, in which Vidar recounts how each week at Valhalla one boy was taken to a dark room and raped, and displays a hook-shaped scar on his arm given to all the boys as a brand. Andrés Hauksson, a prison inmate and former Valhalla resident, claims to know who the killer is: Steinþór Jónsson, a "psychopath" and bully at Valhalla. Andres doubts that Tommi, the boy who disappeared, simply ran away in the middle of a blizzard. Tommi's parents Dagný and Kristján come to the police station and provide one of his teeth.
5	"In Plain Sight"	Þórður Pálsson	Óttar M. Norðfjörð, Mikael Torfason, and Ottó Geir Borg	23 January 2020
Steinþór's fingerprints match those on Þór's photograph, and surveillance footage at a mall shows him arguing with Þór. Armed police raid his last known residence, a halfway house, but he is absent. The DNA from Tommi's tooth matches that of a 30-year-old skeleton found near Valhalla; suspicion naturally falls on Steinþór. Kata locates a car matching the child's description, in a garage containing a wall covered in photographs and information on the victims. Arnar tracks Steinþór to an abandoned power plant — where he finds Steinþór badly wounded at the hands of an inconsolable Kristján, who confesses to the murders. Kata arrives at the plant soon after; Kristján ambushes her and kills himself with her pistol.
6	"Hidden Place"	Þóra Hilmarsdóttir	Óttar M. Norðfjörð, Mikael Torfason, and Ottó Geir Borg	30 January 2020
Kata is placed on leave for allowing the perpetrator to gain control of her gun. Arnar questions Steinþór in the hospital; he denies involvement in Tommi's murder, saying that Tommi attempted to assassinate the boys' rapist and must have been killed for it. The police celebrate quickly solving the case, but Arnar notes that Gummi's murder is different from the others — his eyes were not slashed and the shoe prints found at the scene do not match those found at Ómar's house. Selma tells him that Gummi had planned to bring her several photographs. Nevertheless, Magnús moves to close the case and send Arnar back to Norway. Hákon rewatches the interview with Vidar and uses his descriptions to locate the secret room in Valhalla where the rapes took place. He telephones Kata directly, who agrees to help despite no longer having police powers; they scan the room and, finding dried blood, conclude Tommi was murdered there. Further research uncovers that the report on Valhalla was written by Magnús.
7	"Crossroads"	Þóra Hilmarsdóttir	Óttar M. Norðfjörð, Mikael Torfason, and Ottó Geir Borg	6 February 2020
Hákon and Kata retrieve a box of old photographs of Valhalla, one of which shows Magnús on scene as a police officer in the investigation into Tommi's disappearance. Furthermore, the handwriting in the report matches the handwriting on a note from Magnús. Hákon and Kata request an investigation into why Magnús did not disclose his involvement with Valhalla, but the request is summarily denied and agents are sent to Borgarnes to seize the documents. Arnar requests that Gummi's death be further investigated, then discovers Magnús did not communicate his request to the department at large. He visits Magnús' wife and is revealed to be their foster child. Selma interviews Magnús live, ostensibly about solving the case, but presents him with copies of the documents and questions him sharply. Magnús walks out of the interview, stunned.
8	"Monster in the Dark"	Þórður Pálsson	Óttar M. Norðfjörð, Mikael Torfason, and Ottó Geir Borg	1 March 2020
Kata goes directly to Pétur to request the investigation into Magnús. Pétur is the mastermind and rapist behind the Valhalla crimes, with Magnús as his non-participating accomplice bribed to keep quiet. He drugs Kata's drink and hides her, though she manages to stash her phone away. Magnús, having had second thoughts, visits Pétur and finds the unconscious Kata; Pétur beats him with a wrench. Arnar deduces Pétur's guilt and, finding that Kata is missing, goes to Pétur's house to search for her. His fears are confirmed when he sees her phone ring inside, and Magnús tells him she was taken away in a boat. Arnar informs the police and rushes to the nearest marina. In the ensuing confrontation, Arnar is stabbed several times but tackles Pétur into the water; Kata dives in and rescues Arnar. From the hospital, Kata hears that Magnús is being held for questioning and that Pétur is missing. She looks at the scar on her arm Pétur gave her, identical to those of the Valhalla boys.

== Reception ==
The series received generally positive reviews. On the review aggregator website Rotten Tomatoes, 75% of 8 critics' reviews are positive, with an average rating of 8/10. Writing in The Sydney Morning Herald, Brad Newsome says: "Gutsy performances and judicious rationing of the scenery make for terrific viewing." However, Euan Ferguson of The Guardian writes: "Even halfway through it hasn’t quite got going: despite the dramatic backdrops, and a few stalwart performances, the word is glacial." Writing in The List, Brian Donaldson concludes his review: "The Valhalla Murders is certainly distracting enough, but while it aims to send chills straight down your bones, this Icelandic drama is ultimately a lukewarm bowl of kjötsúpa."

== See also ==
- Nordic noir
