= Vivian Ólafsdóttir =

Icelandic actress (born 1984)

- Born: 1984 (age 41–42); Tórshavn, Faroe Islands
- Education: Icelandic Film School
- Occupation: Actress

Vivian Didriksen Ólafsdóttir (born 1984) is an Icelandic actress. She is best known for her roles in Cop Secret and Operation Napoleon.

== Early life ==
Vivian was born in Tórshavn in the Faroe Islands to an Icelandic father and an Icelandic-born Faroese mother. When she was three years old, the family moved back to Iceland.

== Selected filmography ==
- Trapped (2019) (TV-series)
- Vegferð (2021) (TV series)
- The Last Fishing Trip (2020)
- Cop Secret (2021)
- Black Sands (2022) (TV series)
- The Very Last Fishing Trip (2022)
- Operation Napoleon (2023)
