= The Damned (2024 Palsson film) =

2024 folk horror film

- Theatrical release poster
- Directed by: Thordur Palsson
- Screenplay by: Jamie Hannigan
- Story by: Thordur Palsson
- Produced by: Emilie Jouffroy; Kamilla Hodol; John Keville; Conor Barry; Tim Headington; Theresa Steele Page; Nate Kamiya
- Starring: Odessa Young; Joe Cole; Siobhan Finneran; Rory McCann; Turlough Convery; Lewis Gribben; Francis Magee; Mícheál Óg Lane
- Cinematography: Eli Arenson
- Edited by: Tony Cranstoun; Nathan Nugent
- Music by: Stephen McKeon
- Production companies: Elation Pictures; Netop Films; Wild Atlantic Pictures; Ley Line Entertainment
- Distributed by: Vertical (North America and United Kingdom); Eclipse Pictures (Ireland)
- Release dates: June 6, 2024 (Tribeca); January 3, 2025 (United States)
- Running time: 89 minutes
- Countries: United Kingdom; Iceland; Ireland; Belgium
- Language: English
- Box office: $1.4 million

The Damned is a 2024 folk horror film directed by Thordur Palsson in his directorial debut and written by Jamie Hannigan, who adapted the screenplay from a story by Palsson. It stars Odessa Young as a 19th-century widow who faces an agonizing decision after a shipwreck threatens to fully deplete her village's scarce supplies during a harsh winter. The cast also includes Joe Cole, Rory McCann, Lewis Gribben, and Turlough Convery.

An international co-production between the United Kingdom, Iceland, Ireland and Belgium, The Damned was financed and produced by Elation Pictures in collaboration with Wild Atlantic Pictures, Netop Films, and Ley Line Entertainment. Filming took place in Iceland in 2023.

The Damned premiered at the Tribeca Film Festival on June 6, 2024. Before its debut, Vertical Entertainment acquired North American distribution rights, planning a theatrical release later that year. The film was ultimately released in the U.S. on January 3, 2025, receiving positive reviews and grossing $1.3 million at the box office.

== Plot ==
Eva, a young widow in the 19th century, manages a remote winter fishing outpost in an Arctic bay, inherited after her husband Magnus died in a shipwreck on jagged rocks called the Teeth. The outpost, cut off from the nearest village by a snowbound mountain journey, faces a harsh winter with dwindling supplies. Eva and her crew, consisting of helmsman Ragnar and crewmen Daníel, Hákon, Jónas, Skúli, and Aron, have resorted to eating bait as their catch diminishes. One morning, they witness a shipwreck at the Teeth, but with limited resources, Eva reluctantly agrees to leave the survivors to their fate.

Later, a barrel of salt pork from the wreck washes ashore, prompting Eva to lead the crew on a risky night-time search for more supplies. They recover a crate containing lamp oil and brandy, but encounter desperate survivors clinging to the rocks. Chaos ensues as the survivors try to board the crew's small boat while the crew fights them off, with Daníel killing one of them. Ragnar is pulled into the sea, and the crew is forced to abandon him and escape. Despite their efforts, they return with minimal resources and a growing sense of despair.

The next day, bodies from the wreck wash ashore, and strange occurrences begin. One corpse is found with live eels inside its stomach. Helga, the cook, is wary of Nordic folklore about the draugr revenant creatures of hatred and takes precautions to prevent them from rising. However, Eva begins experiencing vivid dreams and visions of a dark figure, and Helga warns that the draugr must be burned to stop its torment.

After a brief reprieve with a successful catch, disaster strikes again when the fish stores vanish overnight, and Helga goes missing. The crew finds her trail leading to the burial site where they inspect the coffins and find an empty one. Paranoia and delusions grip the group, culminating in violent confrontations among the remaining members. Delusional, Hákon attempts to strangle Daníel before being killed by Aron. Later, Daníel attacks Jónas before slitting his own throat.

Eva, determined to end the threat, sets out to confront the draugr. Skúli falls to his death at the fog-covered burial site, and Eva finds Helga's frozen corpse. The draugr ambushes her when she returns to the cabin, but she shoots it, burns the cabin, and escapes, believing the ordeal is over.

It is revealed that she actually killed a desperate survivor of the shipwreck. Speaking in Basque, he offered Eva a gold pocket watch in exchange for her boat. Unable to understand him, Eva shoots him and sets him on fire.

== Cast ==
- Odessa Young as Eva
- Joe Cole as Daníel
- Rory McCann as Ragnar
- Siobhan Finneran as Helga
- Francis Magee as Skúli
- Turlough Convery as Hakón
- Mícheál Óg Lane as Aron
- Lewis Gribben as Jónas
- Andrean Sigurgeirsson as a survivor and corpse
- Guillermo Uria as a survivor and a draugr

== Production ==
Thordur Palsson wrote the story and directs, while Jamie Hannigan wrote the screenplay. Emilie Jouffroy and Kamilla Hodol produced for Elation Pictures alongside John Keville and Conor Barry of Wild Atlantic Pictures and Netop Films. ish. Producers also include Tim Headington, Theresa Steele Page and Nate Kamiya producing for Ley Line Entertainment.

Odessa Young was cast as Eva in 2021. By April 2023 the cast also included Joe Cole, Lewis Gribben, Siobhan Finneran, Francis Magee, Rory McCann, Turlough Convery, Mícheál Óg Lane and Andrean Sigurgeirsson.

Filming took place in Iceland in 2023 and the project entered post-production in spring 2023.

== Release ==
It had its world premiere at the 2024 Tribeca Film Festival on June 6, 2024. Prior to, Vertical acquired North American distribution rights to the film, planning to release it later in 2024. The film was released in theaters on January 3, 2025.

== Reception ==
=== Box office ===
In the United States, the film made $769,721 from 732 theaters in its opening weekend.

=== Critical response ===
On the review aggregator website Rotten Tomatoes, 90% of 77 critics' reviews are positive, with an average rating of 6.6/10. The website's consensus reads: "Heavy on mood and existential terror, The Damned's patient approach to horror pays off with cerebral chills." Metacritic, which uses a weighted average, assigned the film a score of 64 out of 100, based on 18 critics, indicating "generally favourable" reviews.

Tara Brady of The Irish Times gave the film 3.5/5 stars, writing, "The Damned is powered along by suspicion, atmospherics and an unforgettable landscape. Young is a capable final girl, her fierceness tempered only by the hint of repressed romance with boatswain Daniel. Eli Arenson's camera picks out imposing shapes in the day and ominous shadows at night. Stephen McKeon's piercing strings are appropriately disconcerting." Siddhant Adlakha of Variety wrote, "That The Damned runs out of steam feels like an inevitable outcome. However, that it remains alluring for as long as it does — thanks in large part to Young's magnetic performance, as a young woman burdened by responsibility — is a testament to its strengths as a psychological, atmospheric piece about deep remorse." IndieWire's Christian Zilko gave it a B grade, calling it "a slow-burning work of psychological horror that's more interested in exploring humanity's capacity for guilt than jump scares or gore."
