= Elsa María Jakobsdóttir =

Icelandic film director and screenwriter

- Born: 27 March 1982 (age 43)
- Occupations: film director; screenwriter

Elsa María Jakobsdóttir (born 27 March 1982) is an Icelandic film director and screenwriter. She graduated from the National Film School of Denmark in 2017. Elsa María's graduation film, Atelier, was selected for participation at the Karlovy Vary International Film Festival in the Czech Republic, and won the Vimeo Staff Pick Award at the Aspen Shortsfest. Elsa María's first feature film was Wild Game in 2023.

== Filmography ==
Director

- And Rolling (2008) – short
- Megaphone (2013) – short
- Atelier (2017) – short
- Wild Game (2023)
- Balls (2023) – TV series
