= Ingvar Thordarson =

Icelandic film producer

Ingvar Thordarson is an Icelandic film director who has produced over 50 features, TV series, and documentaries. He has won a number of awards, including The Discovery Award at the Toronto International Film Festival (TIFF), the Critics Award at Cannes Film Festival.

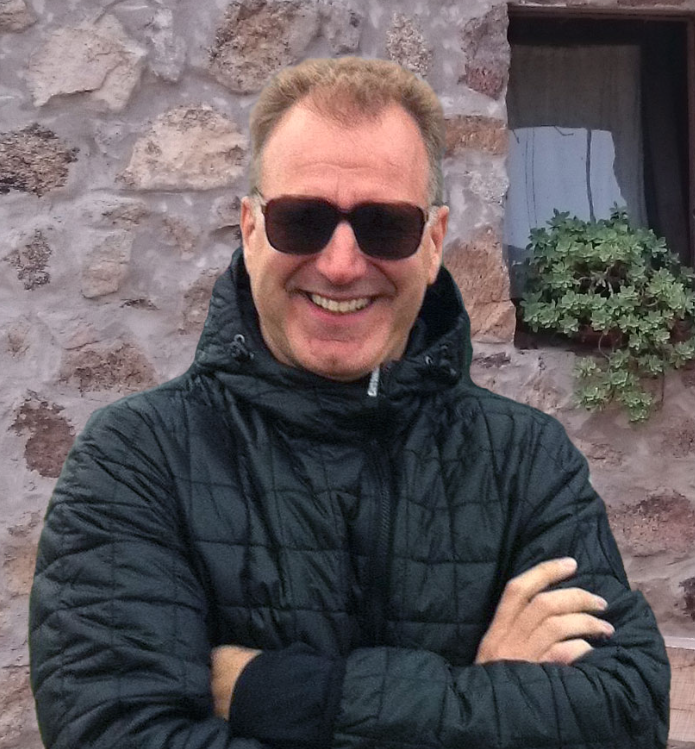
Ingvar Thordarsson

== Early life and education ==
His great-grandmother Katrín Pálsdóttir was a member of the Reykjavík city council. Her daughter, Þórunn Þórðardóttir, was a pioneer in research on planktonic algae and primary productivity in the ocean around Iceland. A modern Icelandic ocean research vessel is named for her.

In his youth, Thordarson was Iceland's fastest runner at the 800 meters.

== Career ==
Thordarson fell into filmmaking when a friend recruited him to help with a film project, but then left to attend film school in Los Angeles, leaving Thordarson to complete the film Remote Control.

The features that Thordarson has produced include: 101 Reykjavík, The Bothersome Man, Life in a Fishbowl, The Grump, Tom of Finland, Unknown Soldier and Odd Fish. Life in a Fishbowl won a record 12 awards at the Icelandic Edda Film Awards. The Grump was Finland's highest-grossing film of 2014. Unknown Soldier was a box office success with over one million tickets sold in Finland while Odd Fish was nominated for 9 Edda Film Awards.

Thordarson has won a number of awards, including The Discovery Award at the Toronto International Film Festival (TIFF) and the Critics Award at Cannes Film Festival. In 2006, he was selected for the European Film Promotion (EFP) Producer-on-the-Move programme at the Cannes Film Festival.

In Iceland, Thordarson has been instrumental in launching the careers of several prominent directors, including Oskar Jonasson, Baltasar Kormakur, Robert Douglas, Gunnar B. Gudmundsson, and Baldvin Z among others.

Thordarson has been a guest lecturer at the London Film School and the University of Exeter, where he contributed to the MA International Film Business courses. Thordarson also used to own a bar in Reykjavik, with Damon Albarn of Blur and Gorillaz and Baltasar Kormákur. As a journalist he interviewed, NBA legend Larry Bird. He was the founder of Iceland's first and only outdoor drive-in cinema. In 1984, he wrote the bestseller "The Perfect Crime".

Thordarson's latest venture is People of Science, an AI agent-driven production studio co-founded with Róbert Bjarnason and Joshua Lanthier-Welch.

== Filmography ==
- Odd Fish (2024) – Producer
- Top 10 Must (2024) – Producer
- Skinny love – (2024) Producer
- 12 hours to destruction (2023)
- The Grump: In search of an Escort (2022) co-producer
- The very last fishing trip (2022) Associate Producer
- 2021 The Wait (co-producer)
- 2020 The Last Fishing Trip (Associate Producer)
- 2019 From Iceland to Eden (co-producer)
- 2019 9 out of 10 (Producer)
- 2019 Tuntematon sotilas
- 2018 Let me Fall, the second biggest box office movie in the Icelandic history. (producer)
- 2017 Unknown Soldier (co-producer).
- 2017 Tom of Finland (co-producer).
- 2017 The Mysteries of Greenland (producer).
- 2016 Reykjavik (producer).
- 2016 The Mine (co-producer).
- 2015 The Midwife.
- 2015 Albatross.
- 2014 Grump (co-producer).
- 2014 Live in a Fishbowl (producer).
- 2014 Mielensäpahoittaja ja miniä (co-producer).
- 2014 Albatross (producer).
- 2014 Life in a Fishbowl (producer).
- 2014 Grandad (producer).
- 2013 Autumn Blood (co-producer).
- 2013 Þetta Reddast (producer).
- 2012 Frost (producer).
- 2012 Santa's Night Out (producer).
- 2011 Mona (producer).
- 2011 Þetta Reddast (producer).
- 2010 Órói (producer).
- 2009 Reykjavik Whale Watching Massacre (producer).
- 2009 Hótel Jörð (short film) (producer).
- 2008 Dark Floors (co-producer – as Ingvar Thordarson).
- 2007 Astrópía (producer).
- 2006 Vandræðamaðurinn/The Troublesome Man (co-producer).
- 2006 Huldufólk 102 (documentary) (co-producer).
- 2005 Strákarnir okkar (producer).
- 2000 101 Reykjavík (producer).
- 1998 Popp í Reykjavík (documentary) (producer – as Ingvar H. Þórðarson).
- 1992 Sodoma Reykjavik.
