= Peter Steuger =

German-born cinematographer (born 1965)

Peter Steuger (born 6 February 1965) is a German-born cinematographer who has worked mostly on German films after a start in Icelandic cinema. He was nominated for a Golden Frog Award for his cinematography on the acclaimed 2000 Icelandic film 101 Reykjavík.

Mostly, however, he has worked in German television.

== Filmography ==
- Ostsee für Sturköppe (AT) (2022)
- McLenBurger - 100% Heimat (2021)
- Oskar, das Schlitzohr und Fanny Supergirl (2020)
- Turkish Ice-Cream (2019)
- Papa auf Wolke 7 (2019)
- cicero (2018)
- Kaisersturz (2017)
- The Chosen Ones (2013)
- Sir Kan 1711 (2011)
- Bloodrop (2011)
- Veda-atatürk (2010)
- Fata Morgana (2007)
- Adem'in trenleri (2007)
- Riding Up Front (2006)
- Drei gegen Troja (2005) (TV)
- The Ring Thing (2004)
- Cowgirl (2004)
- Der gestohlene Mond (2003) (TV)
- Alltag (2003) (TV)
- Tatort (1 episode, 2003)
- 99 Euro Films (2002) (segment "Privat")
- Liebe und Verrat (2002) (TV)
- Boran (2001)
- Doppelter Einsatz (1 episode, 2001)
- 101 Reykjavík (2000)
- The Split (1999)
- Zoe (1999/II)
- Martin - Das erste Mal (1998)
- Parçalanma (1998)
