= Þórður Pálsson =

Icelandic film director

- Born: Þórður Kristján Pálsson; Iceland
- Other name: Thordur Palsson
- Education: National Film and Television School
- Occupations: Film director; screenwriter
- Years active: 2011–present
- Notable work: The Damned

Þórður Kristján Pálsson (also written Thordur Palsson) is an Icelandic filmmaker. He is known for directing the horror film The Damned (2024). He created the crime thriller television series The Valhalla Murders (2019).

== Life and career ==
Þórður Kristján Pálsson was born in Iceland. He graduated from National Film and Television School with a Master of Arts in Directing Fiction in 2015.

He began his career in directing the short films Hardur Heimur (2013), Never Comes the Day (2014), Goodbye Heart (2014) and Brothers (2015).

In 2019, Pálsson created and directed the crime thriller television series The Valhalla Murders for Netflix.

In 2024, he made his directorial debut with the folk horror film The Damned, which premiered at the Tribeca Film Festival on 6 June 2024. It was released theatrically in the United States on 3 January 2025 by Vertical.

In 2025, it was announced that Pálsson was co-developing the climate disaster miniseries Avalanche with Óttar M. Norðfjörð.

In 2026, it was announced that he is set to direct the horror film Dead by Daylight, which is based on the 2016 video game of the same name. He will direct a script written by David Leslie Johnson-McGoldrick and Alexandre Aja, with Jason Blum, James Wan and Stephen Mulrooney producing under their Blumhouse Atomic and Behaviour Interactive banners, respectively.

== Filmography ==
=== Feature films ===
- The Damned (2024) – director, story writer
- Dead by Daylight (TBA) – director

=== Short films ===
- Vera (2011) – assistant director
- Hardur Heimur (2013) – director, writer
- Never Comes the Day (2014) – director
- Goodbye Heart (2014) – director
- Brothers (2015) – director, writer

=== Television series ===
- The Valhalla Murders (2019–2020) – creator, director, story writer
- Avalanche (TBA) – creator, director
