= Parents (2007 film) =

2007 Icelandic film

Foreldrar
- Directed by: Ragnar Bragason
- Written by: Ragnar Bragason; Víkingur Kristjánsson; Nanna Kristín Magnúsdóttir; Ingvar Eggert Sigurðsson
- Starring: Ingvar Eggert Sigurðsson; Edda Arnljótsdóttir; Reine Brynolfsson; Nína Dögg Filippusdóttir
- Edited by: Valdís Óskarsdóttir
- Release date: 19 January 2007 (Iceland)
- Running time: 87 minutes
- Country: Iceland
- Language: Icelandic
- Budget: $400,000

Foreldrar (Parents) is a 2007 Icelandic film written and directed by Ragnar Bragason. Foreldrar won five Edda Awards in 2007, and follows his 2006 film Börn (Children).

== Plot ==
Óskar (Ingvar Eggert Sigurðsson), a dentist, has been married for five years and lives with his wife and their adopted children. However, Oscar wants a biological child, and later discovers that his wife has been deceiving him. Einar (Víkingur Kristjánsson), a successful stockbroker, has been living in a hotel for several months while waiting for his wife to take him back. Katrin Rós (Nanna Kristín Magnúsdóttir) has been living in Sweden for eight years, and then returns to Iceland. Her now eleven-year-old son has been brought up by his grandmother, but Katrin wants him back. She gets a job as a dentist's assistant, and although seeking a new life, her difficult past eventually catches up with her.
