= Guðjón Davíð Karlsson =

Icelandic actor (born 1980)

- Born: 8 April 1980 (age 46); Reykjavík, Iceland
- Other name: Gói
- Education: Iceland Academy of the Arts
- Occupations: Actor; writer
- Years active: 2005–present
- Known for: Trapped; Let Me Fall; Blackport
- Spouse: Ingibjörg Ýr Óskarsdóttir
- Children: 3

Guðjón Davíð Karlsson (born 8 April 1980) is an Icelandic actor and writer. Commonly known as Gói, he is known for Let Me Fall (2018), Trapped (2015) and Blackport (2021). He graduated from the Iceland Academy of the Arts in 2005.

== Personal life ==
Guðjón is the son of Karl Sigurbjörnsson, who served as Bishop of Iceland from 1998 to 2012.

In 2009, Guðjón married Ingibjörg Ýr Óskarsdóttir. Together they have three children.
