= 101 Reykjavík =

2000 Icelandic film directed by Baltasar Kormákur

- DVD cover
- Directed by: Baltasar Kormákur
- Written by: Hallgrímur Helgason; Baltasar Kormákur
- Based on: 101 Reykjavík by Hallgrímur Helgason
- Produced by: Ingvar Þórðarson; Baltasar Kormákur
- Starring: Victoria Abril; Hilmir Snær Guðnason; Hanna María Karlsdóttir
- Cinematography: Peter Steuger
- Edited by: Skule Eriksen; Sigvaldi J. Kárason
- Music by: Damon Albarn; Einar Örn Benediktsson
- Production company: Blueeyes Productions
- Distributed by: 101 Limited
- Release date: 1 June 2000
- Running time: 88 minutes
- Country: Iceland
- Languages: Icelandic; English
- Box office: $546,459

101 Reykjavík is a 2000 Icelandic romantic comedy film directed by Baltasar Kormákur and starring Victoria Abril and Hilmir Snær Guðnason. It is based on the 1996 novel of the same name by Hallgrímur Helgason, and both are set in Reykjavík, Iceland. The title is taken from the postal code for the Miðborg district of central Reykjavík, the postal code being a common way to refer to the area. The film won nine B-class film awards and received ten nominations most notably winning the Discovery Film Award at the Toronto International Film Festival.

The film centers on Hlynur, a thirty-year-old slacker who still lives with his mother, Berglind. His mother’s best friend and Spanish flamenco teacher, Lola, moves in with the two for Christmas. While his mother is away, Hlynur learns Lola is a bisexual with a high sex drive. After a night of drinking, Hlynur and Lola end up having sex. When Berglind returns home, she discloses to Hlynur that she is also a bisexual and she is in love with Lola.

== Cast ==
- Victoria Abril as Lola
- Hilmir Snær Guðnason as Hlynur
- Hanna María Karlsdóttir as Berglind
- Þrúður Vilhjálmsdóttir as Hófí
- Baltasar Kormákur as Þröstur
- Ólafur Darri Ólafsson as Marri
- Þröstur Leó Gunnarsson as Brúsi
- Eyvindur Erlendsson as Hafsteinn
- Halldóra Björnsdóttir as Elsa
- Hilmar Jonsson as Magnús
- Jóhann Sigurðarson as Páll
- Edda Heiðrún Backman as Páll's wife
- Guðmundur Ingi Þorvaldsson as Ellert
- Gunnar Eyjólfsson as the neighbor
- Jónína Ólafsdóttir as woman at the employment office
- Sigríður Helgadóttir as Amma
- Inga Maria Valdimarsdóttir as Vinkona Hófíar
- Agnar Jón Egilsson as Rósi
- Rósi Hattari as Barfluga
- Atli Rafn Sigurðsson as Gulli
- Guðrún María Bjarnadóttir as Ingey
- Lilja Nótt Þórarinsdóttir as Gunna
- Benedikt Ingi Armannsson as Óli

== Reception and accolades ==
=== Critical response ===
On the review aggregator website Rotten Tomatoes, 89% of 47 critics' reviews are positive, with an average rating of 7/10. The website's consensus reads: "A funny, offbeat romantic comedy about an unlikely tryst with the beautiful Icelandic landscape as a backdrop." Metacritic, which uses a weighted average, assigned the film a score of 68 out of 100, based on 15 critics, indicating "generally favorable" reviews.

=== Awards and nominations ===
==== Awards ====
- Toronto International Film Festival (2000)
  - Discovery Award - Baltasar Kormákur
- Thessaloniki Film Festival (2000)
  - FIPRESCI Prize - Parallel Sections: Baltasar Kormákur
- Lübeck Nordic Film Days (2000)
  - Prize of the Ecumenical Jury - Baltasar Kormákur
- Locarno International Film Festival (2000)
  - Youth Jury Award - Baltasar Kormákur
- Iceland Edda Awards (2000)
  - Edda Award - Professional Category: Screenwriting: Baltasar Kormákur
  - Edda Award - Professional Category: Sound: Kjartan Kjartansson
- Pula Film Festival (2001)
  - Big Golden Arena Award - Best Film: Baltasar Kormákur
- Tbilisi International Film Festival (2001)
  - Prize of the Union of Georgian Filmmakers - Baltasar Kormákur

==== Nominations ====
- Locarno Festival (2000)
  - Golden Leopard Award - Baltasar Kormákur
- European Film Award (2000)
  - European Discovery of the Year - Baltasar Kormákur
- Iceland Edda Awards (2000)
  - Edda Award - Actor of the Year: Hilmir Snær Guðnason
  - Edda Award - Actress of the Year: Hanna María Karlsdóttir
  - Edda Award - Actress of the Year: Victoria Abril
  - Edda Award - Best Film
  - Edda Award - Director of the Year: Baltasar Kormákur
- Camerimage (2000)
  - Golden Frog Award - Peter Steuger
- Bogotá Film Festival (2001)
  - Golden Precolumbian Circle Award - Best Film: Baltasar Kormákur
- Buenos Aires International Festival of Independent Cinema (2001)
  - Best Film Award - Baltasar Kormákur
