= Echoes of the End =

2025 video game

- Developer: Myrkur Games
- Publisher: Deep Silver
- Platforms: Windows; Xbox Series X/S; PlayStation 5
- Release: 12 August 2025
- Genre: Action-adventure
- Mode: Single-player

Echoes of the End is a 2025 third-person action-adventure game developed by Myrkur Games and published by Deep Silver. It was released on 12 August 2025 for Windows, Xbox Series X/S and PlayStation 5. The player assumes the role of Ryn (voiced by Aldís Amah Hamilton), a young warrior born with the rare ability to control ancient magic in a world where many kingdoms fight for control over the ruins of an old empire.

== Development ==
Development on the game started in 2016.

=== Voice work ===
Ryn is voiced by Icelandic actress Aldís Amah Hamilton while veteran actor Karl Ágúst Úlfsson voices her companion Abram.

== Reception ==
The PC, Xbox Series X, and PlayStation 5 versions of Echoes of the End all received "mixed or average" reviews from critics, according to the review aggregation website Metacritic. The game received a score of 3 of 5 from Hardcore Gamer, which called it "A Promising Action-Adventure Game with Clunky Combat".

Reception

Aggregate scores
Aggregator	Score
Metacritic	PC: 66/100; PS5: TBD; XSXS: TBD
OpenCritic	33%

Review score
Publication	Score
Hardcore Gamer	3/5
