= Blackport =

Icelandic television series

- Verbúðin
- Genre: Drama
- Written by: Gísli Örn Garðarsson; Björn Hlynur Haraldsson, Mikael Torfason
- Directed by: Gísli Örn Garðarsson; Björn Hlynur Haraldsson, María Reyndal
- Starring: Nína Dögg Filippusdóttir; Björn Hlynur Haraldsson; Gísli Örn Garðarsson; Guðjón Davíð Karlsson; Unnur Ösp Stefánsdóttir; Kristín Þóra Haraldsdóttir
- Country of origin: Iceland
- Original language: Icelandic
- No. of seasons: 1
- No. of episodes: 8

Production
- Producers: Gísli Örn Garðarsson; Björn Hlynur Haraldsson, Nína Dögg Filippusdóttir, Nana Alfreðsdóttir
- Cinematography: Hrafn Garðarsson
- Production company: Vesturport

Original release
- Network: RÚV
- Release: 26 December 2021

Blackport (Icelandic: Verbúðin) is an Icelandic television drama miniseries, written by Gísli Örn Garðarsson, Björn Hlynur Haraldsson and Mikael Torfason and produced by Vesturport in association with RÚV. The first episode of the eight part series premiered on the RÚV (TV channel) on 26 December 2021.

== Synopsis ==
The series takes place from 1983 to 1991 and follows a married couple, Harpa and Grimur, who buy an old trawler with their childhood friends and build a small fishing empire in a village in the Westfjords of Iceland. All goes well until the Icelandic government starts enforcing new restrictive fishing quotas which turn their lives upside down and result in a feud of jealousy, greed and betrayal.

== Cast and characters ==
- Nína Dögg Filippusdóttir as Harpa
- Gísli Örn Garðarsson as Jón Hjaltalín
- Björn Hlynur Haraldsson as Grímur
- Guðjón Davíð Karlsson as Einar
- Unnur Ösp Stefánsdóttir as Freydís
- Anna Svava Knútsdóttir as Ella Stína
- Kristín Þóra Haraldsdóttir as Tinna
- Selma Björnsdóttir as Gunný
- Hilmir Snær Guðnason as Smári
- Pétur Jóhann Sigfússon as Gils
- Steinunn Ólína Þorsteinsdóttir as Jóna Margrét
- Sverrir Þór Sverrisson as Pétur
- Ingvar Eggert Sigurðsson as Torfi
- Jóhann Sigurðarson as Sólon
- Jógvan Hansen as Þrándur
- Benedikt Erlingsson as Steingrímur Hermannsson
- Björgvin Franz Gíslason as Hemmi Gunn
- Björn Stefánsson as Laddi/Elsa Lund

== Episodes ==
No.	Title	Directed by	Original release date
1	"The contract" (Icelandic: Samningurinn)	Gísli Örn Garðarsson	26 December 2021
Jón Hjaltalín, mayor of a small town in the Westfjords of Iceland, and Torfi, his brother, plan to buy an old trawler and start a fishing enterprise.
2	"Strike" (Icelandic: Verkfall)	Gísli Örn Garðarsson	2 January 2022
A year later, the whole country is in a state of paralysis due to a strike by fishermen. Harpa and Grímur are between a rock and a hard place and have to choose between becoming a strike breaker or drowning in debt.
3	"Carpeting" (Icelandic: Kalt stríð)	Gísli Örn Garðarsson	9 January 2022
The couples, together with Jón Hjaltalín, take steps to adapt the quota system to their needs. Meanwhile, the struggle for ownership of the fish continues in the municipality.
4	"Mayday" (Icelandic: Vestfjarðanornin)	Gísli Örn Garðarsson	16 January 2022
Smári, an investigative journalist from Reykjavík, is working on an article about Harpa and is looking for clues about her connection with Jón Hjaltalín.
5	"Talkshow (Hemmi Gunn)" (Icelandic: Maður ársins)	María Reyndal	23 January 2022
Harpa and Grímur meet with the Prime Minister in the hope of getting an increased quota to keep the company afloat. Tinna returns to town and has her own plans. Grímur and Jón Hjaltalín appear on Hemmi Gunn's talk show.
6	"Fathers and sons" (Icelandic: Í öfugum nærbuxum)	Björn Hlynur Haraldsson	30 January 2022
Harpa and Grímur's marriage is up in the air. While they work on their marriage, Harpa sends Einar and Freydís around the country in search of smaller boats to buy. Smári is still with Harpa under the microscope.
7	"Karaokee" (Icelandic: Kóngar og drottningar)	María Reyndal	6 February 2022
The team meets to settle their differences but have a few too many drinks.
8	"Land of dreams" (Icelandic: Sameign þjóðarinnar)	Björn Hlynur Haraldsson	13 February 2022
The town is in disarray after the latest events and all eyes are on Harpa. At the same time, Smári comes to the town.

== Production ==
Filming started in 2020 and took place in Reykjavík and in the Westfjords.

== Reception ==
According to a poll by Prósent, 57% of the Icelandic population watched the first episode of the show with 88% giving it a positive review. Following the shows première, Independence Party parliamentarian Ásmundur Friðriksson criticised the show for its portrayal of the rural people of Iceland.

=== Awards ===
In September 2021, the series won the Grand Prize at the 2021 Series Mania festival. In November it won the jury prize at the Serielizados Fest in Spain. On 2 February 2022, the Nordisk Film & TV Fond announced that Gísli Örn Gardarsson, Björn Hlynur Haraldsson and Mikael Torfason, writers of Blackport, were the recipients of the 2022 Nordic TV Drama Screenplay Award.

== Sequel ==
In March 2025, it was reported that a sequel, titled Stick 'Em Up, was in the making.
