= Wild Game (film) =

2023 Icelandic film

- Film poster
- Icelandic: Villibráð
- Directed by: Elsa María Jakobsdóttir
- Screenplay by: Elsa María Jakobsdóttir; Tyrfingur Tyrfingsson
- Produced by: Þórir S. Sigurjónsson; Arnar Benjamín Kristjánsson; Ragnheiður Erlingsdóttir
- Starring: Gísli Örn Garðarsson; Hilmir Snær Guðnason; Þuríður Blær Jóhannsdóttir; Nína Dögg Filippusdóttir; Anita Briem; Björn Hlynur Haraldsson; Hilmar Guðjónsson; Kristín Þóra Haraldsdóttir
- Cinematography: Bergsteinn Björgúlfsson
- Edited by: Kristján Loðmfjörð
- Distributed by: Sena
- Release date: 6 January 2023 (Iceland)
- Running time: 110 minutes
- Country: Iceland
- Language: Icelandic

Wild Game (Icelandic: Villibráð) is a 2023 Icelandic film written and directed by Elsa María Jakobsdóttir.

Wild Game is a comedy drama set a dinner party in Vesturbær. Seven friends decide to put their phones on the table and agree that all incoming calls and messages will be shared with the party to prove that none have anything to hide. It is a remake of the 2016 Italian film Perfetti Sconosciuti - Perfect Strangers.

== Plot ==
Eva and Runar host a dinner party for 5 guests in an affluent district. One couple did not come, because the woman looked at partner's phone and found he was cheating. Eva challenges everyone to put their phones on the table and unlock them. Some are reluctant. Steini receives an erotic message, but it was actually host Runar playing a joke. Petur gets a call from his sister revealing he has applied for a new job in the north. Then Eva gets a call from her father revealing she is having an operation. She has to tell the guests it is breast augmentation. Leifur asks Petur to swap phones, as he is expecting a woman to send him pictures at night, but Petur refuses. Eva finds the sauce that Runar cooked to be awful and tips it down the sink. Next Hildur gets a call from a friend telling her to be more assertive in her sex life, which leads to most awkward moment so far. The men get messages about a football game, except Leifur, and he is miffed. His wife Hildur is drunk and angry and throws wine at Runar. Leifur takes advantage of the commotion to swap phones. Petur gets the nude picture and smashes the phone. Then Leifur gets a message from a famous footballer on Petur's phone and has to explain how he knows him. A volcano erupts on the horizon, serving as a metaphor for the rising tension at the party. They go outside to take a group photo and Björg gets messages from her ex. Runar gets a call from his teenage daughter, saying nasty things about her mother, who is listening. Leifur gets a call on Petur's phone from the footballer. Steini is upset to learn the star football player is gay. Another message from the football player shocks Hildur, she walks out. It also causes a fight with Steini, who is homophobic. And so it continues, learning of more affairs and drug taking. The night ends with broken marriages and damaged friendships.
