= Tyrfingur Tyrfingsson =

Icelandic playwright, author and director

Tyrfingur Tyrfingsson (born 1987) is an Icelandic playwright, author and director. He was educated at The Iceland Academy of the Arts until 2011, the Janáček Academy of Music and Performing Arts, and Goldsmiths University of London from 2011-2012. He was one of ten people to receive the Outstanding Young Icelanders award in 2016.

== Works ==
- Bláskjár/Blue Eyes
- The Commercial of the Year
- Harold Pinters Silence at Reykjavik Art Festival in 2015.
- Bláskjá for which he was awarded Grímuverðlaun.
- Kartöfluæturnar
- Wild Game

He has been awarded and nominated in a number of categories for Grima – awards for Performing Arts in Iceland.
