= Operation Napoleon =

2023 Icelandic film by Óskar Þór Axelsson

- Poster
- Icelandic: Napóleonsskjölin
- Directed by: Óskar Þór Axelsson
- Screenplay by: Marteinn Þórisson
- Based on: Operation Napoleon by Arnaldur Indriðason
- Produced by: Tinna Proppé; Hilmar Sigurðsson; Dirk Schweitser; Anita Elsani
- Starring: Vivian Ólafsdóttir; Jack Fox; Iain Glen; Ólafur Darri Ólafsson; Atli Óskar Fjalarsson; Þröstur Leó Gunnarsson; Nanna Kristín Magnúsdóttir; Adesuwa Oni
- Cinematography: Árni Filippusson
- Edited by: Gunnar B. Guðbjörnsson
- Music by: Frank Hall
- Production company: Saga Film
- Release date: 3 February 2023 (South by Southwest)
- Running time: 112 minutes
- Country: Iceland
- Languages: Icelandic; English
- Budget: 900.000.000 ISK

Operation Napoleon (sometimes with subtitle Frozen Conspiracy, Icelandic: Napóleonsskjölin) is a 2023 Icelandic thriller film directed by Óskar Þór Axelsson, starring Vivian Ólafsdóttir, Jack Fox and Iain Glen. It is based on Arnaldur Indriðason's best selling book of the same name.

== Plot ==
The film tells the story of Kristín, an ambitious lawyer who is drawn into an unexpected sequence of events when her brother stumbles upon a World War II plane wreck on top of Vatnajökull.

== Cast ==
- Vivian Ólafsdóttir as Kristín Johannesdottír
- Jack Fox as Steve Rush
- Iain Glen as William Carr
- Wotan Wilke Möhring as Simon
- Ólafur Darri Ólafsson as Einar
- Atli Óskar Fjalarsson as Elías
- Adesuwa Oni as Julie Ratoff
- Þröstur Leó Gunnarsson as Jóhannes
- Nanna Kristín Magnúsdóttir as Rósa
- Annette Badland as Sarah Steinkamp

== Production ==
Production for the film started in 2021.

== Reception ==
=== Audience viewership ===
The filmed opened the premiered in Iceland on 3 February 2023 and by May 2023, it was the second most viewed domestic made film in Iceland for the year.

=== Critical response ===
Salvör Gullbrá Þórarinsdóttir at Heimildin gave the film three stars, calling it a "Professionally braided Hollywood-flick on an Icelandic glacier".

== Sequel ==
In November 2025, Operation Napoleon – Tears of the Wolf, a sequel to Operation Napoleon, was filming in Finland, Iceland, and Germany.
