= Víkingur Kristjánsson =

Icelandic actor

- Born: 26 March 1972 (age 53); Neskaupstaður, Iceland
- Citizenship: Icelandic
- Occupations: Actor; producer; scriptwriter
- Years active: 1998–present
- Known for: Trapped; The Valhalla Murders; Vegferð; Réttur

Víkingur Kristjánsson (born 26 March 1972) is an Icelandic actor and screenwriter. He is known for Trapped, The Valhalla Murders, Vegferð, Réttur and Ríkið. He was one of the founders of the theatre group Vesturport.

== Early life ==
Víkingur was born Neskaupstaður and lived in Eskifjörður for his first two years until he moved to Ísafjörður where he lived until he turned 16-years old. His father died in the 1986 Ljósufjöll air crash.

== Filmography ==
Film
Year	Title	Role	Notes
2003	Þriðja nafni	Stefán	
2007	Parents	Einar Birgir	
2007	Astrópía	Prison guard	
2008	Country Wedding	Hafsteinn	
2010	Mamma Gógó		
2010	Woyzeck 2010	Captain	
2010	Undercurrent	Jón Geir	
2010	Gauragangur	Arnór	
2011	Rokland	Einar Alberts	
2013	XL	Ágúst	
2015	Bakk	Viðar	
2015	Sparrow	Dagur	
2018	Let Me Fall	Gísli	

Television
Year	Title	Role	Notes
2007	The Night Shift	Younger police officer	1 episodes
2008	Ríkið		
2009-2010	Réttur	Hörður	12 episodes
2011	Heimsendir	Rúnar	9 episodes
2016	Borgarstjórinn	Egill Gauti	
2017	Fangar	Sverrir	5 episodes
2017	Steypustöðin	Various	1 episode
2019	Trapped	Tómas	3 episodes
2020	The Valhalla Murders	Officer Hákon	5 episodes
2021	Vegferð	Víkingur	6 episodes
