= Gísli Örn Garðarsson =

Icelandic actor and director (born 1973)

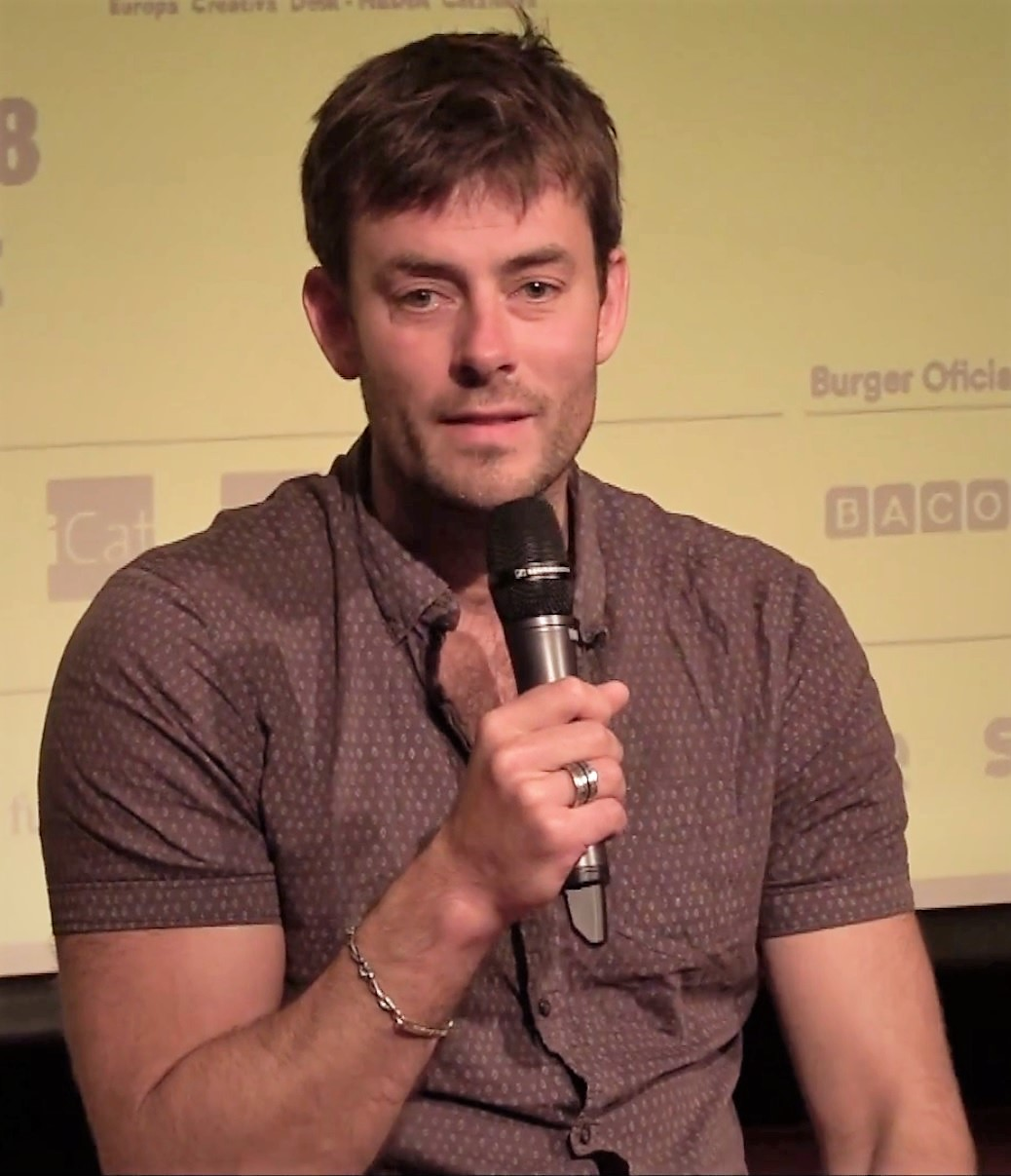
- Gísli Örn on Media Catalunya in 2018
- Born: 15 December 1973 (age 52); Reykjavík, Iceland
- Education: Iceland Academy of the Arts
- Occupations: Actor and director
- Spouse: Nína Dögg Filippusdóttir
- Children: 2

Gísli Örn Garðarsson (born 15 December 1973) is an Icelandic actor and director. He is one of the founders of Vesturport, a theatre and film company based in Reykjavík, and is also sometimes a scriptwriter and producer. Before focusing on acting, he competed internationally as a gymnast.

== Early life and education ==
Gísli Örn was born in Reykjavík but grew up in Oslo. His father, Garðar Gíslason, is a teacher; his mother, Kolbrún Högnadóttir, worked for the publisher Fróði. Gísli Örn finished school at Hamrahlið College in Hlíðahverfi and studied Sociology at the University of Iceland and West European Studies at the University of Oslo before completing training in drama at the Iceland Academy of the Arts. He had wanted to study drama in Oslo but failed to gain entry. For many years he was a gymnast, competing for the Icelandic, Norwegian, and Danish national teams and belonging to the elite Ármann club together with Guðjón Guðmundsson, who was national champion in his age group for several years; he considered becoming a gymnastics coach but found it unappealing.

== Career ==
Gísli Örn has appeared in many Icelandic films, beginning in 2001 with a major role in Dramarama. That year he also co-founded the drama company Vesturport with 13 others. In 2010 he had a supporting role in the Disney film Prince of Persia: The Sands of Time.

He made his directing début with a circus-themed production of Shakespeare's Romeo and Juliet at the Reykjavík City Theatre in 2003, also playing Romeo. The production's success led to an invitation to transfer it to the Young Vic in London, from where it moved in 2004 to the Playhouse Theatre. He has since directed further stage productions, including an adaptation of Kafka's The Metamorphosis in association with David Farr and the Lyric Theatre, Hammersmith, which toured in many European countries and the US in addition to the UK and Iceland. Büchner's Woyzeck at the BAM Next Wave Festival in 2008, directed by Gísli Örn, was Vesturport's first appearance in the US; with the American Repertory Theater production of The Heart of Robin Hood, also written by Farr, he became the first Icelander to direct on Broadway. He has also acted as producer and scriptwriter in some Vesturport projects.

Gísli Örn's directorial work draws on his gymnastics experience and is often described as very physical and highly theatrical. Beginning with Woyzeck, the productions have often included music specially composed by Nick Cave.

In 2023, a non-replica version of the musical "Frozen" based on the Disney Film of the same name directed by Gísli Örn opened at Det Norske Teatret starting a tour in all Scandinavia, this new version had a nordic vision changing sets and orchestrations to match the culture better. This tour is and will be shown in Norway, Iceland, Sweden, Finland and Denmark.

=== Selected theatre work ===
- 2003: Shakespeare's Romeo and Juliet, Reykjavík City Theatre, subsequently Young Vic Theatre and Playhouse Theatre, London: director, Romeo
- 2005: Georg Büchner's Woyzeck, with music by Nick Cave, Barbican Theatre, London, Brooklyn Academy of Music: director.
- 2006: adaptation of Angela Carter's Nights at the Circus, touring production with Kneehigh Theatre: main cast
- 2006–2013: adaptation of Kafka's The Metamorphosis, Lyric Theatre, Hammersmith; Dublin; National Theatre, Oslo; Cuvilliés Theatre, Munich; Kennedy Center, Washington; Paramount Center, Boston: director, scriptwriter with David Farr, Gregor
- 2008–2009: Don John, adaptation by Emma Rice of Mozart's Don Giovanni, Kneehigh Theatre, Courtyard Theatre, Stratford-on-Avon; Spoleto Festival USA: Don John
- 2010: Goethe's Faust: director, scriptwriter
- 2011: The Heart of Robin Hood, script by David Farr; Royal Shakespeare Company: director
- 2013: Shakespeare's The Tempest, Residenz Theatre, Munich: director
- 2013–2015: The Heart of Robin Hood, American Repertory Theater: director
- 2023-present: Frozen, Det Norske Teatret, Oslo; The National Theater, Iceland; the City Theater, Stockholm; the City Theater, Finland: director

=== Selected filmography ===
- 2001: Dramarama: main cast
- 2003: Karamellumyndin: main cast
- 2004: Niceland (Population. 1.000.002)
- 2005: Beowulf & Grendel
- 2006: Children: main cast, screenplay, producer
- 2006: Áramótaskaupið (television)
- 2007: Foreldrar (Parents): producer
- 2008: Mannaveiðar (I Hunt Men): main cast
- 2008: Country Wedding
- 2010: Kóngavegur (King's Road): main cast, co-producer
- 2010: Prince of Persia: The Sands of Time
- 2010: Jitters
- 2010: Undercurrent: main cast, screenplay, producer
- 2011: Borgríki (City State)
- 2011: Korríró
- 2013: Spooks and Spirits: main cast
- 2014: Grafir & Bein (Graves & Bones)
- 2016: The Oath: main cast
- 2016: Beowulf: Return to the Shieldlands (television): main cast
- 2017: Prisoners (television)
- 2018: One Night
- 2020: Ragnarok (TV series) (Netflix)
- 2021-2022: Blackport (series)
- 2023: Wild Game

== Honours ==
In addition to awards won by Vesturport, Gísli Örn received a Shooting Stars Award at the 2007 Berlin Film Festival for his role in Children. In June 2010 he was awarded the Order of the Falcon, Knight's Cross, for services to Icelandic culture.

== Personal life ==
Gísli Örn has a younger sister, Rakel. He has two children with his partner, Nína Dögg Filippusdóttir, who is also a member of Vesturport.
