= Black Sands (TV series) =

Icelandic television series

- Svörtu Sandar
- Genre: Crime; Drama
- Created by: Aldís Amah Hamilton; Ragnar Jónsson
- Written by: Baldvin Zophoníasson; Ragnar Jónsson; Aldís Amah Hamilton
- Directed by: Baldvin Zophoníasson
- Starring: Aldís Amah Hamilton; Steinunn Ólína Þorsteinsdóttir
- Country of origin: Iceland
- Original languages: Icelandic; English
- No. of seasons: 2
- No. of episodes: 16

Production
- Executive producers: Andri Óttarsson; Andri Sveinsson; Baldvin Zophoníasson; Heiðar Már Guðjónsson
- Producers: Andri Ómarsson; Arnbjörg Hafliðadóttir; Hörður Rúnarsson
- Production company: Glassdriver

Original release
- Network: Stöð 2
- Release: 25 December 2021

Black Sands (Icelandic: Svörtu Sandar) is an Icelandic crime-drama television series created by Aldís Amah Hamilton, Andri Óttarsson, and Ragnar Jónsson. It is directed by Baldvin Zophoníasson. The show premiered on Stöð 2 on 25 December 2021.

== Synopsis ==
The series focuses on Aníta Elínardóttir, a thirty-year-old policewoman who takes a job in her childhood home, the only position she can get after being forced to resign in Reykjavík. She has not been to the village in fourteen years, and in the meantime, it has become a tourist trap, surrounded by black sand. Worst of all, she has to move in with her mother, Elín, with whom she has a broken relationship due to a difficult past.

When Aníta arrives in town, the body of a young woman is found on the sandy beach. She seems to have fallen from the overhanging cliff. An investigation begins, led by police chief Ragnar, village doctor Salómon, and the local police team. Nothing criminal seems to have taken place, until a friend of the deceased is found later that night, battered and covered in blood.

As the investigation dwindles, Aníta ends up at the centre of a fiery love triangle that complicates things for her. It turns out that the local police have not been properly carrying out investigations, and there are possible links with other cases. A showdown with her mother is inevitable. Aníta gets sucked into the search for a potential mass murderer, and the showdown turns into a nightmare.

In the second season, Aníta has an infant child. The father, Gústi, a police officer from Reykjavík, has left his wife and moved to the village to be closer to the child, bringing his teenage daughter. After a suspicious death, Gústi and Aníta investigate the abuse of girls at a foster home many years before, and Aníta learns that her uncle was involved. The uncle is killed, and there are several suspects. Aníta struggles with motherhood, and Gústi takes the baby from her, which almost results in tragedy.

== Cast and characters ==
Season 1

- Aldís Amah Hamilton as Aníta Elínardóttir
- Þór Tulinius as Ragnar, chief police inspector
- Steinunn Ólína Þorsteinsdóttir as Elín, Aníta's estranged mother
- Ævar Þór Benediktsson as Gústi, detective and Aníta's former lover
- Kolbeinn Arnbjörnsson as Salómon Túlinius, local doctor and Aníta's boyfriend
- Lára Jóhanna Jónsdóttir as Fríða Melsteð, local cop, later Aníta's girlfriend
- Aron Már Ólafsson as Tómas, local cop
- Dan Cade as Stephen Mayer, widower of the murder victim
- Þorsteinn Bachmann as Karl, national chief of police
- Kristín Lea as Halla, Salómon's late mother

Season 2

- Ólafía Hrönn Jónsdóttir as Helena, Tómas's grandmother
- Aðalbjörg Emma Hafsteinsdóttir as Jonna, Gústi's daughter
- Edda Guðnadóttir as Dísa, Jonna's lesbian friend
- Pálína Rós Ingadóttir as Abbý, Jonna's friend
- Pálmi Gestsson as Davíð, Salómon's father
- Mímir Bjarki Pálmason as young Davíð

== Episodes ==
=== Series 1 (2021) ===
No.	Title	Directed by	Written by	Original release date
1	"Black Beach"	Baldvin Zophoníasson	Aldís Amah Hamilton; Ragnar Jónsson; Baldvin Zophoníasson; Andri Óttarsson	25 December 2021
2	"The Journey Is the Destiny"	Baldvin Zophoníasson	Aldís Amah Hamilton; Ragnar Jónsson; Baldvin Zophoníasson; Andri Óttarsson	26 December 2021
3	"Insomnia"	Baldvin Zophoníasson	Aldís Amah Hamilton; Ragnar Jónsson; Baldvin Zophoníasson; Andri Óttarsson	2 January 2022
4	"You're Not Here"	Baldvin Zophoníasson	Aldís Amah Hamilton; Ragnar Jónsson; Baldvin Zophoníasson; Andri Óttarsson	9 January 2022
5	"Salt in the Wounds"	Baldvin Zophoníasson	Aldís Amah Hamilton; Ragnar Jónsson; Baldvin Zophoníasson; Andri Óttarsson	16 January 2022
6	"The Curtain Comes Down"	Baldvin Zophoníasson	Aldís Amah Hamilton; Ragnar Jónsson; Baldvin Zophoníasson; Andri Óttarsson	23 January 2022
7	"A Little Blond Boy"	Baldvin Zophoníasson	Aldís Amah Hamilton; Ragnar Jónsson; Baldvin Zophoníasson; Andri Óttarsson	30 January 2022
8	"A Lovers Night"	Baldvin Zophoníasson	Aldís Amah Hamilton; Ragnar Jónsson; Baldvin Zophoníasson; Andri Óttarsson	6 February 2022
