= Life in a Fishbowl =

2014 film

- Film poster
- Directed by: Baldvin Zophoníasson
- Written by: Baldvin Zophoníasson; Birgir Örn Steinarsson
- Starring: Hera Hilmar
- Music by: Ólafur Arnalds
- Release date: 16 May 2014
- Running time: 130 minutes
- Country: Iceland
- Language: Icelandic

Life in a Fishbowl (Icelandic: Vonarstræti, literally Hope Street) is a 2014 Icelandic drama film directed by Baldvin Zophoníasson. It was screened in the Discovery section of the 2014 Toronto International Film Festival. It was selected as the Icelandic entry for the Best Foreign Language Film at the 87th Academy Awards, but was not nominated.

== Plot ==
The movie follows three people living in Reykjavik in 2006. Eik, a kindergarten teacher and mother struggling to make money thus working as part time as a prostitute, Sölvi, a former athlete who is now in the corporate world and Móri, an older man struggling with alcoholism.

== Cast ==
- Hera Hilmar as Eik
- Thor Kristjansson as Sölvi
- Ingvar Þórðarson as Hannes
- Sveinn Ólafur Gunnarsson as Gústi
- Þorsteinn Bachmann as Móri
- Laufey Elíasdóttir as Aníta
- Birgir Örn Steinarsson as Rakari / Barber
- Markus Reymann as Gerald

== See also ==
- List of submissions to the 87th Academy Awards for Best Foreign Language Film
- List of Icelandic submissions for the Academy Award for Best Foreign Language Film
