= Nína Dögg Filippusdóttir =

Icelandic actress and producer

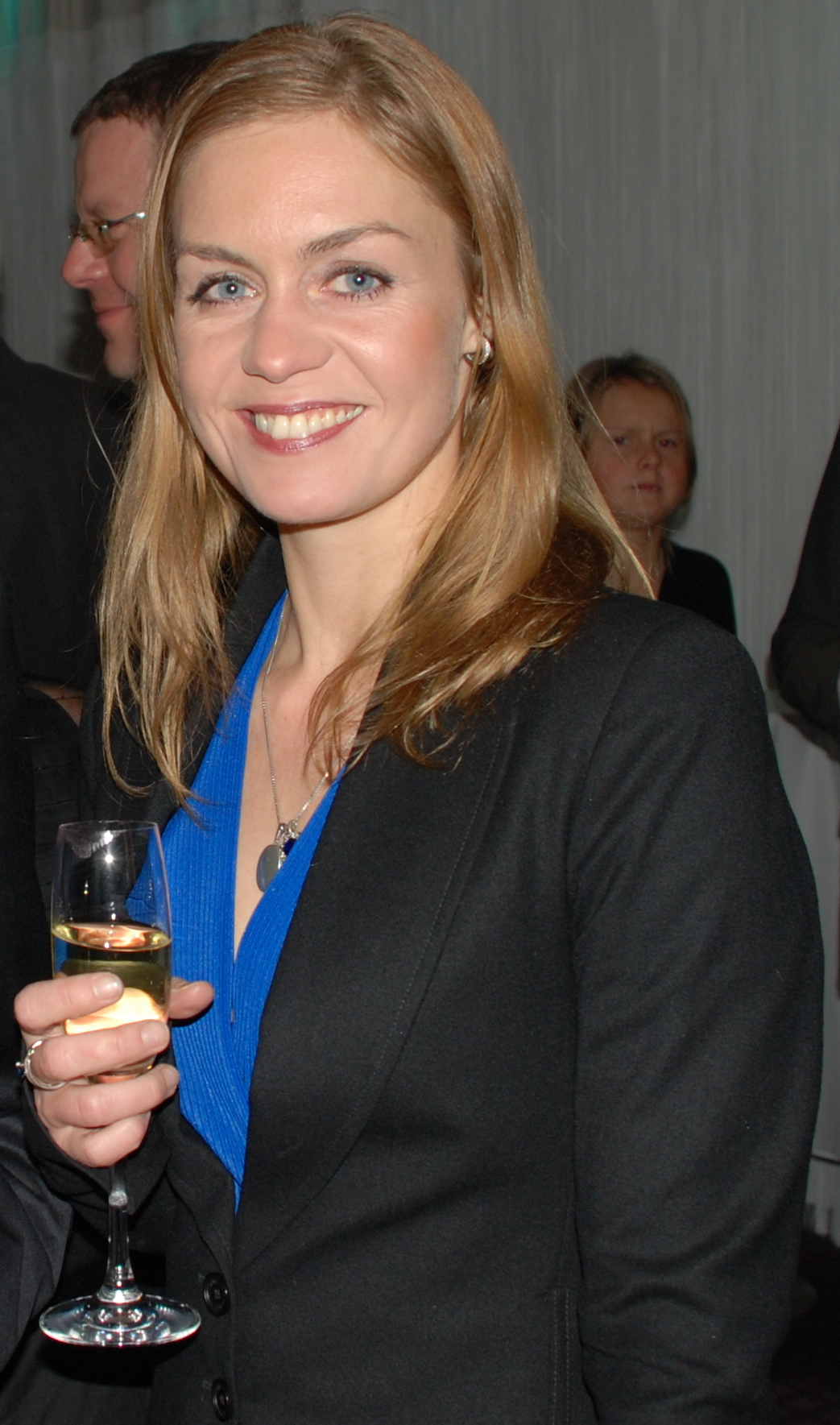
- Nína at the 2007 Edda Awards
- Born: 25 February 1974 (age 52); Reykjavík, Iceland
- Occupations: Actress; producer
- Years active: 2001–present
- Known for: Trapped; The Valhalla Murders; Blackport
- Spouse: Gísli Örn Garðarsson
- Children: 2

Nína Dögg Filippusdóttir (born 25 February 1974) is an Icelandic actress and producer. She is known for Children (2006), Trapped (2015), Undercurrent (2010), The Valhalla Murders (2020) and Blackport (2021).

== Early life ==
Nína was born in Reykjavík. Her parents, Bylgja Scheving and Filippus Gunnar Árnason, were very young and split up when she was two years old. She grew up in the Breiðholt district of Reykjavík.

When she was 19 years old, she worked as an au pair for one year in Denmark. She had plans to go to acting school there when she was not working, but found she was too busy. "I became the mom of the household. It was a 5 person family. In the mornings I made breakfast for everybody and then cooked, did the laundry, cleaned, did the grocery shopping, and dropped the kids off, and picked them up later. If I spent more time with the kids than on the chores the lady of the house got upset. After six months I asked myself what I was still doing there and quit. I hurried home and to college".

== Career ==
Nína graduated from the acting department of the Iceland Academy of the Arts in 2001. In her class were fellow actors Björn Hlynur Haraldsson and Víkingur Kristjánsson, who she had met in the Vesturport theatre group.

She starred in many plays before taking to films, including Faust (Vesturport, Reykjavík City Theatre), Woyzeck (Vesturport, Barbican, Reykjavík City Theatre), Surf and Rambo 7 (The National Theatre of Iceland), Romeo and Juliet (Vesturport, The Young Vic, Playhouse, Reykjavík City Theatre), and Like Water for Chocolate (Reykjavík City Theatre).

She was chosen as one of the "Shooting Stars" at the Berlin International Film Festival in 2003.

In 2021, she appeared as Harpa in the Icelandic hit drama mini-series Blackport.

In 2023, she was awarded the Order of the Falcon for her contributions to drama and television.

== Filmography ==
Year	Title	Role	Notes
2001	Dramarama	Auður	
2002	The Sea	María	
2002	Stella í Framboði	Hrafnhildur	
2005	The Girl in the Café	Assistant Receptionist	
2006	Children	Karítas	
2007	Parents	Nurse	
2007	Astrópía	Voice	Cowboy Scene
2007	Áramótaskaup 2007	various roles	
2008	Country Wedding	Lára	
2010	Kóngavegur	Rósa	
2010	Undercurrent	Drífa	
2011	Heimsendir	Sólveig	TV-series
2015	Réttur	Soffía	TV-series
2015	Grafir & Bein	Sonja	
2015–2016	Trapped	Agnes	TV-series
2016	Heartstone	Hulda	
2020	The Valhalla Murders	Kata	TV-series
2021–2022	Blackport	Harpa	TV-series
2023	Wild Game		
2026	Hildur	Beta	TV-series

== Personal life ==
Nína was a stepsister to musician Sigurjón Brink. They were very close and she saw him as her real brother. She is also godmother to his daughter Kristín María Brink.

She has a daughter (born 2006) and a son (born 2011) with her partner, actor and producer Gísli Örn Garðarsson.

In a 2010 interview, she stated that her favourite city was London and her favourite mobile app was yr.no.
