= Let Me Fall =

2018 Icelandic drama film

- poster
- Icelandic: Lof mér að falla
- Directed by: Baldvin Zophoníasson
- Written by: Birgir Örn Steinarsson; Baldvin Zophoníasson
- Produced by: Júlíus Kemp; Ingvar Þórðarson
- Starring: Elín Sif Halldórsdóttir; Lára Jóhanna Jónsdóttir; Þorsteinn Bachmann; Atli Oskar Fjalarsson; Sveinn Ólafur Gunnarsson; Haraldur Stefansson
- Cinematography: Jóhann Máni Jóhannsson
- Edited by: Úlfur Teitur Traustason
- Music by: Ólafur Arnalds
- Production company: The Icelandic Filmcompany
- Release date: 7 September 2018 (TIFF)
- Running time: 136 minutes
- Country: Iceland
- Language: Icelandic

Let Me Fall (Icelandic: Lof mér að falla) is a 2018 Icelandic drama film directed by Baldvin Zophoníasson. It was screened in the Contemporary World Cinema section at the 2018 Toronto International Film Festival.

== Plot ==
Stella and Magnea, two teenage girls, meet at a party. They begin spending time together, experimenting with tobacco, alcohol, and drugs, and become lovers. Magnea eventually drops out of school and distances herself from her former friends. The story follows the two girls as they grow up, experience addiction, drug trafficking, prostitution, and stints in prison, switching between their teenager years and their thirty-something future selves. Stella eventually cleans up and lives a comfortable but unsatisfying life. Magnea, on the other hand, meets a young man in rehab, who later becomes her pimp, then kicks her out when she is so stupefied and dishevelled that customers no longer want her.

== Cast ==
- Elín Sif Halldórsdóttir as young Magnea
- Kristín Þóra Haraldsdóttir as older Magnea
- Eyrún Björk Jakobsdóttir as young Stella
- Lára Jóhanna Jónsdóttir as older Stella
- Þorsteinn Bachmann as Hannes
- Atli Oskar Fjalarsson as Atli rauði
- Sveinn Ólafur Gunnarsson as Erlingur Hafsteinn
- Haraldur Stefansson as Gylfi

== Reception ==
Let Me Fall was received positively by most critics, with The Hollywood Reporter's Stephen Dalton saying that "framing the plot in female-driven coming-of-age terms, with a tortured same-sex romance at its heart... gives this story a fresher angle than most drug movies." Andrew Parker of The Gate said the film "eschews cheap clichés surrounding drug dependency in favour of a more delicately crafted, time shifting character study."

For The Canadian Press, David Friend said the film "doesn't blink in showing how drugs can destroy lives, and its heartbreaking moments come when it shows how powerless the people around an addict can feel."
