= Vesturport =

Icelandic theatre group

- Formation: 18 August 2001; 24 years ago
- Type: Theatre group
- Location: Reykjavík, Iceland
- Website: vesturport.com

Vesturport is an Icelandic theatre group, founded on 18 August 2001. The group has performed plays in the United States, Europe and Australia. In 2011, it received the Europe Prize Theatrical Realities for its complete work, innovative character and originality.

== Overview ==
On the day that the theatre group was founded, the play Discopigs was performed in Reykjavík. Over the next three years the group performed the plays Key around the neck, Titus and Mr. Man. Its first performance outside of Iceland was Romeo and Juliet, on 18 November 2004 in Playhouse Theatre, London. Romeo and Juliet was subsequently shown in Germany, Poland, Norway and Finland. In 2004 the group premiered the Icelandic play Brim and it received the Icelandic Gríman award for the best theatre script. On 30 April 2004 the group premiered the first theatre play of Víkingur Kristjánsson, Shopping mall shattered. In 2008 the group premiered the plays Together and Love in Reykjavík City Theatre and Dubbeldelush in Akureyri Theatre. On 15 October the group premiered the play Woyzeck in the Howard Gilman Opera House in Brooklyn. A year later the group premiered the play Metamorphosis in Tasmania in a collaboration with Lyric Hammersmith. The group then collaborated with Nick Cave and Warren Ellis to compose music for the play Faust, with planned performances in Berlin, Hamburg and London. In 2010 the group received favorable criticism from the New York Times for the play Metamorphosis, which increased the popularity of the group. A year later the group started collaborating with Tony-award winner Robin de Levita on Metamorphosis, Romeo and Juliet, Loce the Musical, The Brothers Karamazov, and Mad Alice, with planned performances in the United States.

== Europe Theatre Prize ==
In 2011, the group was one of the recipients of the XII Europe Prize Theatrical Realities, in Saint Petersburg, with the following motivation:

Established in 2001, it is a theatre company. Its founders, Gísli Örn Gardarsson, Nína Dögg Filippusdóttir, and Ingvar E. Sigurðsson, are three actors and Vestuport theatre has quickly established itself as one of Iceland’s most inventive theatre and film companies. Known for innovative productions that challenge traditional performance text, the Reykjavik-based ensemble has produced three films and eleven theatre works in just seven years and has been touring all over Europe and has also collaborated with famous artists such as Nick Cave and Warren Ellis.

== See also ==
- Reykjavík Theatre Company
