= Hanna María Karlsdóttir =

Icelandic actress (born 1948)

- Born: 19 November 1949 (age 76)
- Education: Icelandic Drama School
- Occupation: Actress
- Notable work: Trapped and 101 Reykjavík

Hanna María Karlsdóttir (born 19 November 1948) is an Icelandic actress of stage and screen. She is best known for her roles in the TV series Trapped and the 2000 film 101 Reykjavík.

== Early life and education ==
Hanna María Karlsdóttir was born on 19 November 1948 in Iceland.

Hanna grew up in Keflavík and played handball in her youth with ÍBK and was a member of Iceland's junior national teams. In 1967, she was selected to a 22-player training camp for the Icelandic handball team.

She graduated from the Icelandic Drama School in 1978.

== Career ==
Hanna is best known for her stage roles.

In 1995 she appeared in the historical drama feature Agnes.

She is known for her roles in the 2000 film 101 Reykjavík and the TV series Trapped (2015–present).
