= Baldvin Zophoníasson =

Icelandic film director, writer, and producer (born 1978)

- Born: 1978 (age 47–48); Akureyri, Iceland
- Occupations: Film/television director; writer; producer
- Known for: Life in a Fishbowl; Let Me Fall; Réttur; Trapped
- Awards: Edda Award for Best Director

Baldvin Zophoníasson, or Baldvin Z, is an Icelandic film and television director, writer, and producer. He was born in 1978 in Akureyri. He is best known for his films Jitters, Life in a Fishbowl, Let Me Fall, and the television series Réttur and Trapped.

== Career ==
Baldvin's first feature film was the Icelandic-language teenage drama Jitters (titled Órói in Icelandic), released in 2010. The film portrays "the confusion and excitement of being a teenager". It won the Children's Film Award at the Kristiansand International Children's Film Festival. His second feature was the 2014 movie Life in a Fishbowl, co-written with Birgir Örn Steinarsson, which won at the Edda Awards (including Best Director), Zurich Film Festival, and Tallinn Black Nights Film Festival, and gathered numerous award nominations. The film is an ensemble drama set in the year before the severe economic collapse in Iceland in 2008. It portrays people from various walks of life whose lives intersect in unexpected ways.

Baldvin's next major project was directing the third season of TV series Réttur, created by Sigurjón Kjartansson and produced by Saga Film for Icelandic national television RÚV and Netflix. He directed three episodes of Baltasar Kormákur's Nordic noir drama Trapped in 2016. In 2017, he released two documentaries. The first was titled Reynir Sterki: Beyond Strength and described the tragic life of vagabond strongman Reynir Örn Leósson. The second was Island Songs, a real-time multimedia project documenting the creation of Ólafur Arnalds' album Island Songs in various locations around Iceland. This was Ólafur's third collaboration with Baldvin, as he'd previously scored Baldvin's first two feature films.

His second collaboration with Birgir Örn Steinarsson, the feature film Let Me Fall, was released in 2018.

== Director filmography ==
Film
Year	Title	Notes
2009	Hotel Earth	Short film
2010	Jitters	
2014	Life in a Fishbowl	
2017	Reynir Sterki: Beyond Strength	Documentary
2017	Island Songs	Documentary
2018	Let Me Fall	

Television
Year	Title	Notes
2015	Réttur	9 episodes
2016	Trapped	3 episodes
2021	Black Sands	
