= Björn Hlynur Haraldsson =

Icelandic actor (born 1974)

- Born: 8 December 1974 (age 51); Reykjavík, Iceland
- Education: Iceland Academy of the Arts
- Occupations: Actor; director
- Spouse: Rakel Garðarsdóttir

Björn Hlynur Haraldsson (born 8 December 1974) is an Icelandic actor and director. Björn was born in Reykjavík, Iceland, and graduated from the Icelandic Arts Academy in 2001. He co-founded the theatre company Vesturport the same year. In spring of 2015, he starred in the psychological thriller TV series Fortitude. He has previously been noted for roles in the films Eleven Men Out and Jar City. Most recently he appeared as King Eist in Netflix’s adaptation of The Witcher, as Pétur in the A24 horror film Lamb and as Rikki in Cop Secret.

== Film and television roles ==
Year	Title	Character	Refs
2002	Reykjavik Guesthouse: Rent a Bike	Guðjón	
2004	Kaldaljós	Indriði	
2004	Love is in the Air	Hann Sjálfur	
2005	Eleven Men Out	Ottar Thor	
2006	Jar City	Sigurður Óli	
2008	Country Wedding	Barði	
2009	Hamarinn	Helgi	
2009	Desember	Raggi	
2010	Kóngavegur	Önni	
2010	Brim	Logi	
2011	Kurteist fólk	Arnar	
2012	City State	Ingólfur	
2013	The Borgias	Gian Paolo Baglioni	
2014	The Lava Field	Helgi	
2015–2018	Fortitude	Eric Odegård, (Deputy)	
2015–2019	Trapped	Trausti Einarssson	
2019	The Witcher	King Eist Tuirseach	
2020	Eurovision Song Contest: The Story of Fire Saga	Arnar	
2021	Lamb	Pétur	
2021	Cop Secret	Rikki	
2021-2022	Blackport	Grímur	
2022	Woman at Sea	Jude	
2023	Wild Game		
2024	A Gentleman in Moscow	Emile Zhukovsky	
