= Reykjavík City Theatre =

Theatre in Iceland

- Borgarleikhúsið
- Interactive map of Reykjavík City Theatre
- Address: Listabraut 3 Reykjavík; Iceland
- Coordinates: 64°07′44″N 21°53′46″W
- Type: Theatre

Construction
- Opened: 1989
- Years active: 1989–present

Website
- borgarleikhus.is

The Reykjavík City Theatre (RCT) (Icelandic: Borgarleikhúsið [ˈpɔrkarˌleiːkˌhuːsɪθ]) is a theatre in Reykjavík, Iceland.

== History ==
In 1989, after ninety years of performing in a small wooden building in the city centre, the company inaugurated a new theatre building adjacent to the Kringlan mall. It opened with a double bill of plays by Kjartan Ragnarsson, based on works by Halldór Laxness.

== Characteristics ==
The large new building (11,000 square metres in total), has four adaptable stages. The main stage seats 547 people, a black box theatre holds 220, a theatre-in-the-round 198, and a café-theatre has room for 120 at full capacity.

The RCT employs up to 200 people at any given time. The company also contracts international talent for a selection of projects. All elements of productions take place within the theatre itself, which has its own lighting, costume, make-up, and sound departments, set and props workshops, as well as a technical stage crew. The artistic director is Egill Heiðar Anton Pálsson, and the CEO is Krístín Ögmundsdóttir.

The company season runs from September through June each year. The RCT stages nine to thirteen new productions annually, in addition to hosting a variety of collaborations with other theatre companies. Its audience tallies range from 150,000 to 220,000 per year, making it the most popular theatre in Iceland. The RCT is partly subsidised by the City of Reykjavík.

== Productions ==
The company draws on international and domestic works. The RCT promotes a wide range of outside events, varying from philosophical debates to rock concerts. The company also promotes productions by independent theatre groups. Each year, the theatre hosts international guest performances, while exporting progressive Icelandic theatre to festivals and theatres on the international scene. The RCT has collaborated with international companies such as the Barbican Centre in London and Het Muziek Theater in Amsterdam.
