= Sigurjón Kjartansson =

Icelandic writer and producer (born 1968)

- Born: September 20, 1968 (age 57); Reykjavík, Iceland
- Occupations: Producer; Screenwriter; Comedian; Musician
- Known for: Trapped; Tvíhöfði; Fóstbræður; Katla

Sigurjón Kjartansson (born 20 September 1968) is an Icelandic writer and producer. He is the co-creator of Katla and the showrunner of Trapped. He is also known for his role in the radio duo Tvíhöfði with Jón Gnarr and for his part in the popular Icelandic television sketch comedy Fóstbræður. He has since written many Icelandic TV series, including Svínasúpan (2004), Stelpurnar (2005–2008) and the drama series Pressa (2007–2012) and Réttur (2009–2010) Réttur was later picked up by NBC for a US remake. Between 1988 and 1994, he was active in the Icelandic music scene as vocalist and lead guitarist in the metal band HAM. In 1992, he wrote the score for the Icelandic cult film Sódóma Reykjavík.

In 2012, Sigurjón joined Icelandic director Baltasar Kormákur in rebranding his company under the name of RVK Studios, where he served as Head of Development until the end of 2021. He served as showrunner of the first two seasons of Trapped and Netflix' Katla, co-created by Sigurjón and Baltasar. In 2022 he formed his own production company, S800 and wrote and directed his first feature film, Grand finale, which premiered in 2024.

== Selected filmography ==
=== Actor ===
- Virgin Mountain (2015) as Mörður
- Fangavaktin (2009) as Olgeir
- Dagvaktin (2008) as Olgeir
- Næturvaktin (2007) as Olgeir
- Svínasúpan (2003) Various Roles
- The Icelandic Dream (2000) as Loser
- Fóstbræður (1997-2001) Various Roles
- Remote Control (1992) as Orri

=== Writer ===
- Black Angels (2008)
- Court (2009–2010)
- Press (2007–2012)
- Ástríður (2009–2013)
- Trapped (2015–2021)
- Katla (2021)
- Grand finale (2024)

=== Producer ===
- Press
- Black Angels
- Court
- Hlemmavídeó (2010) (co-producer)
- Hulli (2013)
- Ástríður (2009–2013)
- Trapped (2015–2016)
