= Buffalo Virgin =

Studio album by HAM
- Released: 1989
- Length: 34:00
- Label: One Little Indian (UK)

HAM chronology
Hold (1988)	Buffalo Virgin (1989)	Saga rokksins (1993)

Buffalo Virgin is the second album by the Icelandic rock band HAM, and their first full-length LP. It was the only one of their albums to be released by a non-Icelandic label, One Little Indian. It includes a cover of ABBA's Voulez-Vous.

== Track listing ==
1. "Slave" (words: Óttarr Proppé, music: Sigurjón Kjartansson)
2. "Youth" (words: Jón Gnarr, music: Sigurjón Kjartansson)
3. "Voulez Vous" (words and music: Benny Andersson, Björn Ulvaeus)
4. "Linda Blair" (words: Óttarr Proppé, music: Sigurjón Kjartansson)
5. "Svin" (words: Óttarr Proppé, music: Sigurjón Kjartansson)
6. "Whole Lotta Love" (words: Óttarr Proppé, music: Sigurjón Kjartansson)
7. "Misery" (words and music: Sigurjón Kjartansson)
8. "Egg Ya Hummie" (words: Óttarr Proppé, music: Sigurjón Kjartansson)
9. "Forbidden Lovers" (words: Óttarr Proppé, music: Sigurjón Kjartansson)
10. "Death" (words: Óttarr Proppé, music: Sigurjón Kjartansson)

== Personnel ==
- Sigurjón Kjartansson - Vocals, guitars, producer
- Óttar Proppé - Vocals
- S. Björn Blöndal - Bass, guitar, producer
- Hallur Ingólfsson - Drums
- Ævar Ísberg - Drums (on tracks 4 & 9)
- Jón Egill Eyþórsson - Guitar (on track 9)
- Sveinn Kjartansson - Engineer, co-producer
