= Hildur (novel series) =

Novel series by Satu Rämö

- The Clues in the Fjord (orig. 2022, transl. 2024); The Grave in the Ice (2023, 2025); The Shadow of the Northern Lights (2023, 2025); The Secrets from the Deep (2024, 2026); The Stranger from the Mountains (2025, 2026)
- Author: Satu Rämö
- Translator: Kristian London
- Country: Finland
- Language: Finnish
- Genre: Detective fiction
- Publisher: WSOY; Zaffre (English translation)
- Published: 2022–present
- Published in English: 2024–present
- Media type: Print (paperback, hardcover); audiobook; e-book
- No. of books: 5

Hildur is a detective novel series, written in Finnish and set in Iceland, by Finnish-Icelandic author Satu Rämö.

== Plot ==
Hildur Rúnarsdóttir is an Icelandic police officer haunted by the unexplained disappearance of her sisters twenty-five years ago. Her colleague, Finnish police officer Jakob Johanson, is fighting for custody of his son. As Hildur tries to investigate her family's murky past, the pair must battle their demons while solving murders on the isolated west coast of Iceland.

== Reception ==
As of September 2024, the publishing rights to the Hildur series had been sold to 17 countries, including Germany, France, the UK, the Nordics, and the Baltic countries.

In 2025 The Clues in the Fjord, an English translation of Hildur (the first book in the series), won the Petrona Award 2025 for the Best Scandinavian Crime Novel. It was translated into English by Kristian London.

== Adaptations ==
The first three books in the series were adapted for the stage by Satu Rasila. The resulting play, titled Hildur, premiered in autumn 2024 at Turku City Theatre, directed by Anne Rautiainen.

As from November 2022 work began to adapt Hildur for television. Filming of the television series, Hildur, began in Iceland in February 2025, and is directed by Tinna Hrafnsdóttir. The titular character is portrayed by Ebba Katrín Finnsdóttir with Jakob by Lauri Tilkanen. The series began airing in January 2026. In Australia, it was streamed by SBS from October.

== Novels ==
1. Hildur. Helsinki: WSOY, 2022. ISBN 978-951-0-47920-9
  (English translation by Kristian London: The Clues in the Fjord. Zaffre, 2024. ISBN 978-1-804-18840-8)
2. Rósa & Björk. Helsinki: WSOY, 2023. ISBN 978-951-0-48127-1
  (English translation by Kristian London: The Grave in the Ice. Zaffre, 2025. ISBN 978-1-804-18847-7)
3. Jakob. Helsinki: WSOY, 2023. ISBN 978-951-0-48124-0
  (English translation by Kristian London: The Shadow of the Northern Lights. Zaffre, 2025. ISBN 978-1-804-18843-9)
4. Rakel. Helsinki: WSOY, 2024. ISBN 978-951-0-50733-9
  (English translation by Kristian London: The Secrets from the Deep. Zaffre, 2026. ISBN 978-1-806-17274-0)
5. Tinna. Helsinki: WSOY, 2025. ISBN 978-951-0-50852-7
  (English translation by Kristian London: The Stranger from the Mountains. Zaffre, 2026. ISBN 978-1-806-17276-4)
