= Bjarnfreðarson =

2009 Icelandic film by Ragnar Bragason

- Directed by: Ragnar Bragason
- Written by: Jóhann Ævar Grímsson; Jón Gnarr; Jörundur Ragnarsson; Pétur Jóhann Sigfússon; Ragnar Bragason
- Produced by: Arnbjörg Hafliðadóttir; Ragnar Bragason
- Starring: Jón Gnarr; Jörundur Ragnarsson; Pétur Jóhann Sigfússon
- Production company: Sagafilm
- Distributed by: Samfilm
- Release date: 26 December 2009
- Country: Iceland
- Language: Icelandic

Bjarnfreðarson (also called Mr. Bjarnfreðarson) is a 2009 Icelandic comedy film directed by Ragnar Bragason, director of the TV series trilogy consisting of Næturvaktin, Dagvaktin and Fangavaktin, to which it is a sequel. At its première in Iceland, it was met with wide success, even beating Avatar at the box office on its opening weekend. It was watched by over 20% of the Icelandic population, which is a record for an Icelandic film, and won 11 Edda Awards.

In the film, the title character's name is the subject of some mockery for his having a matronymic – as Bjarnfreður's son – rather than a patronymic. In the film this is connected to the mother's radical feminism and shame over his paternity, which are part of the film's plot. Flashbacks to Georg Bjarnfreðarson's childhood show how he became such an unlikeable person. He is reunited with Ólafur and Daníel (from the three TV series), who help him redeem himself.
