= Reykjavik to Rotterdam (2005) =

Reykjavik to Rotterdam (2005) was a film and music festival organized by the Reykjavik To Foundation. Films were screened and performances were held in the LantarenVenster theatre, except for Jóhann Jóhannsson's concert, which was held in the Saint Laurens Church. 12 Tónar set up their mobile shop as well.

== Performances ==
- Jóhann Jóhannsson
- IBM 1401
- Trabant
- Einar Sonic
- Kira Kira
- Mugison
- Kippi Kaninus
- Petur Ben

== Movies ==
- Ring road
- The Icelandic Dream
- The happy end
- A Man Like Me
- Leap year
- Devil's island
- Rock in Reykjavik
- Last stop
- Full house
- Red buses
- Screaming Masterpiece
- Mugison video clips
- Me and my mum
- Small mall
- Swan
- Death and the children
- The seagulls laughter
- While the cats away
- Cold Fever
- Love is in the air
- Angels of the Universe
- Children of Nature
- The last farm in the valley
- Dark horse
- Regina
- Caramels
- Cold light
- In my life
- Surviving the volcano
- Niceland
- BSI
- Dramarama
- Old spice
- The outlaw
- Lokinhamrar
- Running with the herd
- The Dance
- Count me out
- The lost little caterpillar
- Behind schedule
- Kissing
- Don't worry, be happy!
- Honor of the house
- Hanna from Gjogur
- When the Raven Flies
- The Sea
- 101 Reykjavík
- Noi the Albino
