= Júlíus Kemp =

Icelandic film director

- Born: 2 December 1967 (age 58); Reykjavík, Iceland
- Occupations: Producer, director
- Known for: Let Me Fall, Íslenski draumurinn, Life in a Fishbowl

Júlíus Kemp (born 2 December 1967) is an Icelandic film director and producer.

== Biography ==
Kemp studied film at the West Surrey College of Art & Design (WSCAD) in the United Kingdom. During his time there, he created the short film Happy Birthday in 1991. Kemp left WSCAD to work as an editor on Children of Nature, directed by Fridrik Thor Fridriksson. In 1991, he co-founded the Icelandic Film Company. He co-wrote and directed his first feature film, Veggfóður erótísk ástarsaga (1992), which was produced by Fridriksson and Kemp.

== Career ==
From 1993 to 2000, Kemp served as the director of the Reykjavík International Short Film Festival. During this period, he also worked as a film critic (1993–1994), was a member of the selection committee for the Reykjavík Film Festival, and served on the Association of Icelandic Film Producers (SÍK) board. Kemp has been a member of the European Film Academy since 2001.

In addition to his work in film, Kemp has directed music videos. His short film Bardinn won second prize at the Nordic Short Film Festival in 1982 and first prize at the Reykjavík Short Film Festival the same year. His short film Ak-Rek-Ak received second prize at the Akureyri Short Film Festival in 1987.

In 1997, Kemp directed the film Blossi/810551, which was selected as the Icelandic entry for the 1998 Academy Awards. In 1998, his short film, The Happy End, was selected in competition at the Toronto International Short Film Festival.

In 2000, Kemp produced and shot The Icelandic Dream (2000), which received four nominations at the Edda Awards, including Best Picture. The film competed for Best Nordic Film at the Gothenburg Film Festival 2001 and was featured in the official selections of several international festivals, including Edinburgh, Toronto, and Pusan.

In 2002, Kemp collaborated again with Icelandic Dream director, Robert I. Douglas, to produce the film Man like me, A (2002), starring Icelandic comedian Jón Gnarr and Hong Kong actress/pop singer Stephanie Che.

== Awards ==
Kemp’s short film Bardinn won second prize at the Nordic Short Film Festival in 1982 and first prize at the Reykjavík Short Film Festival the same year. His short film Ak-Rek-Ak received second prize at the Akureyri Short Film Festival in 1987.

== Selected filmography ==
=== Producer ===
- 2022 – Abbababb! (producer)
- 2021 – The Wait (co-producer)
- 2021 – Hvunndagshetjur (producer)
- 2019 – From Iceland to Eden (co-producer)
- 2019 – Skandall (producer)
- 2018 – Let Me Fall (producer)
- 2017 – The Unknown Soldier (co-producer)
- 2016 – Reykjavík (producer)
- 2015 – Albatross
- 2014 – The Grump (co-producer)
- 2014 – Life in a Fishbowl (producer)
- 2014 – Ó blessuð vertu sumarsól (producer)
- 2013 – Rock Bottom (producer)
- 2012 – Frost (producer)
- 2012 – Mona (producer)
- 2012 – Santa's Night Out (producer)
- 2011 – Godur Stadur (producer)
- 2010 – Hæ gosi (executive producer)
- 2010 – Jitters (producer)
- 2009 – How to Win a Lost Game (producer)
- 2009 – Reykjavik Whale Watching Massacre (producer)
- 2009 – Hotel Earth (producer)
- 2008 – Dark Floors (co-producer)
- 2007 – Astrópía (producer)
- 2006 – Den brysomme mannen (co-producer)
- 2006 – Huldufólk 102 (associate producer)
- 2005 – Strákarnir okkar
- 2002 – A Man Like Me
- 2000 – Íslenski draumurinn
- 1997 – Blossi/810551
- 1992 – Veggfóður: Erótísk ástarsaga

=== Director ===
- 2009 – Reykjavik Whale Watching Massacre
- 1997 – Blossi/810551
- 1992 – Veggfóður: Erótísk ástarsaga

=== Actor ===
- 1992 – Veggfóður: Erótísk ástarsaga
- 2002 – A Man Like Me

=== Writer ===
- 1992 – Veggfóður: Erótísk ástarsaga

=== Cinematographer ===
- 2000 – Íslenski draumurinn

=== Editor ===
- 1997 – Blossi/810551
