= Hildur (TV series) =

Finnish-Icelandic TV series

- Genre: Police procedural, crime drama
- Created by: Matti Laine
- Based on: Hildur or The Clues in the Fjord by: Satu Rämö; Kristian London (translator)
- Written by: Matti Laine, Margrét Örnólfsdóttir, Satu Rämö
- Directed by: Tinna Hrafnsdóttir
- Starring: Ebba Katrín Finnsdóttir; Lauri Tilkanen; Rick Okon; Baldur T. Hreinsson; Nína Dögg Filippusdóttir
- Countries of origin: Iceland, Finland
- Original languages: Icelandic, English, Finnish
- No. of seasons: 1
- No. of episodes: 6

Production
- Running time: 45 minutes
- Production companies: Take Two, Sagafilm, IPR.VC

Original release
- Network: Nelonen, Síminn
- Release: 26 January 2026

Hildur is a Finnish-Icelandic police procedural, crime drama television series based on the novel series of the same name (2022–2025) by author Satu Rämö. It was adapted by Matti Laine, who is also the head writer and is assisted by Margrét Örnólfsdóttir. Filming began in Iceland in February 2025, and is directed by Tinna Hrafnsdóttir. Action is set in Iceland's Ísafjörður, Westfjords and Reykjavík. The titular character is portrayed by Icelandic actress, Ebba Katrín Finnsdóttir with trainee detective, Jakob played by Finnish actor, Lauri Tilkanen. Hildur investigates crimes in the Ísafjörður region, she is assisted by Jakob and another trainee, Florian (Rick Okon).

Hildur is a joint co-production by Take Two Studios (Finland) and Sagafilm (Iceland) with funding from IPR.VC. The series of six episodes began streaming in Finland on Nelonen from 26 January 2026 and streamed on Iceland's Síminn. London-based Cineflix Rights on-sold the series internationally to Canal+ in France, NPO in the Netherlands, RTV in Slovenia and LTV in Latvia. In Australia, it was streamed by SBS from 22 October 2026.

== Premise ==
Ísafjörður detective, Hildur investigates a serial killer who targets seemingly unrelated victims using various methods. She is assisted by two trainees, the Finnish-born Jakob and his German counterpart, Florian. The first murder victim, Jón was tied to a chair and had his throat cut just before an avalanche buried the crime scene. Jón had been a recently released, convicted drug dealer and rapist. Heiðar, a prominent Reykjavík businessman, is run down in an underground car park. Meanwhile, Hildur learns of connections to the long ago disappearance of her two younger sisters. Social worker and Hildur's boyfriend, Freysi, discovers he was adopted. Jakob attempts to gain access to his son from ex-wife, Leena, who relocated to Westfjords. Florian deals with an opioid addiction, keeping it secret from police chief and long-term friend, Beta. While out jogging in the snow, the third victim is struck on the head with a rock, and then thrown off a ledge.

== Cast and characters ==
=== Main cast ===
- Ebba Katrín Finnsdóttir as Hildur Rúnarsdóttir: Ísafjörður detective, Freysi's girlfriend, Rósa and Björk's elder sister (both missing for 25 years), parents died in vehicle collision; enjoys surfing
- Lauri Tilkanen as Jakob Johansson: Finnish-born police trainee, former teacher, relocated to West Iceland to be near ex-wife, Leena and their son, Matias; knits jumpers
- Rick Okon as Florian Herrmann: German-born police trainee, restarting career after irregularities in Dortmund
- Baldur T. Hreinsson as Hreinn Rafnsson: Ísafjörður uniform police, squad manager
- Nína Dögg Filippusdóttir as Beta Björnsdóttir: Ísafjörður police chief, knew Florian's father during German-based training
- Oddur Júlíusson as Freyr "Freysi" Gunnarsson: Child Protection social worker, visits Litla Brekka (youth care centre), Elva's son, Hildur's boyfriend

=== Supporting cast ===
- Bjarni Snæbjörnsson as Hákon: Reykjavík-based forensic pathologist
- Iina Kuustonen as Leena Pesonen: Finnish-born Flateyri resident, Heiðar's public relations officer, Sarita's sister, Matias's mother, Jakob's ex-wife. n.b. Iina and Minka Kuustonen are real-life sisters.
- Oona Airola as Anna Virtanen: stewardess, craft shop owner; begins friendship with Jakob
- Halldóra Geirharðsdóttir as Tinna Atladóttir: Hildur's aunt, raised Hildur after her parents died, now visually impaired
- Snorri Engilbertsson as Heiðar Aronsson: Reykjavík entrepreneur, plans Ísafjörður hotel, Kolfinna's husband, Valgerður's former lover
- Kristín Lea as Gabríela Nielsen: Reykjavík doctoral research scientist, specialising in inheritable neurodegenerative diseases
- Arnaldur Halldórsson as Pétur Geirsson: 15-year-old drug addict, supervised by Freysi
- Hafdís Helga Helgadóttir as Jóhanna: Reykjavík senior police officer, Tumi's domestic partner
- Bergur Ebbi Benediktsson as Tumi: Reykjavík senior police officer, Jóhanna's domestic partner, Hildur's former lover
- Hjörtur Jóhann Jónsson as Kormákur Hrafnsson: former drug-dealer, Sandra's ex-husband, Sölvi's father; Jón's associate
- Jasmín Dúfa Pitt as Lára Aradóttir: Heiðar's secretary, personal assistant
- Minka Kuustonen as Sarita Pesonen: Leena's sister, Matias's aunt. n.b. Iina and Minka Kuustonen are real-life sisters.
- Ólafía Hrönn Jónsdóttir as Marta Birgisdóttir: sheep farmer, Valgerður's mother, Helga's friend
- Þór Tulinius as Jón Jónsson: recently released convicted serial rapist, drug-dealer
- Pálmi Gestsson as Magnús Sigtryggsson: former emergency services officer, semi-retired taxi driver in Reykjavík
- Guðrún Gísladóttir as Elva Sigurðardóttir: Freysi's mother, Ingibjörg's aunt
- Logi Liekki Sæberg Hakonarson as Matias: Jakob and Leena's son, lives with Leena and Sarita
- Lára Jóhanna Jónsdóttir as Lísa Arnardóttir: pregnant woman, married to Logi, inherits cabin
- David Katrinarson as Jónas: emergency services leader
- Mía Eldey Einarsdóttir as Rósa Rúnarsdóttir: Hildur's younger sister (long-term missing person)
- Iðunn Eldey Stefánsdóttir as Björk Rúnarsdóttir: Hildur's youngest sister (long-term missing person)
- Erling Jóhannesson as Salmar Oscarson: Hnífsdalur resident
- Stefán Þór Þorgeirsson as Doctor Anton: Ísafjörður hospital medic
- Katrín Halldóra Sigurðardóttir as Kolfinna Gudmunðsdóttir: Heiðar's wife, wealthy, has affairs
- Þröstur Leó Gunnarsson as Olgeir: tunnel contractor, Helga's father

== Production ==
Hildur (2022) is the first novel in Satu Rämö's series of the same name, which was written in Finnish but set in her adopted home of Iceland. It was translated into English as The Clues in the Fjord by Kristian London in 2024. Take Two Studios (Finland) began adapting Hildur for TV from November 2022. As a joint co-production, Take Two was joined by Sagafilm (Iceland) with funding from IPR.VC, which provided €1 million per episode. Finnish crime writer, Matti Laine had already read the original novel before he was approached by Take Two to create the TV series. To differentiate it from typical Nordic noir, Rämö uses the term Nordic Blue for its genre, which Laine describes as "character-driven more than whodunnit, with the icy landscape making it blue, not noir." Meanwhile, Icelandic co-writer Margrét Örnólfsdóttir had not read the novel, but "when I did... I was pleasantly surprised by its authenticity."

Filming began in Iceland in February 2025 using locations in Westfjords and Reykjavík. One of the writers' biggest changes from the novel was the addition of Florian, to provide "flesh and humor." Icelandic director Tinna Hrafnsdóttir praised the main cast of Finnsdóttir (Hildur), Tilkanen (Jakob) and Okon (Florian) as they developed a "natural chemistry" together. Rämö visited the set during filming and also approved of its adaptation, "it's amazing to see how my own familiar home village in the Western Fjords, by the sea, has become the world of Hildur." Rämö makes an uncredited cameo appearance in the series. Finnsdóttir enjoyed working with the Finnish actors and crew. "Our shared humour is often a bit black and sarcastic", she explained.

== Episode guide ==
No. in season	Title	Directed by	Written by	Original release date
1	"Two Trainees" (Kaksi harjoittelijaa)	Tinna Hrafnsdóttir	Matti Laine, Margrét Örnólfsdóttir, Satu Rämö	26 January 2026
After surfing Hildur remembers her younger sisters. Beta phones Hildur: avalanche alert; Pétur has run off. Hildur enters buried house, sees corpse’s hand. Day before: Pétur hides as Hildur drives into Ísafjörður. Jakob meets Anna on airplane. Hildur picks up Florian from airport. Freysi: Pétur’s run off. While searching Pétur's room, Florian discovers pills. Florian checks care centre’s computer: Pétur, via dark web, contacted "Fluttershy112". Hildur, Freysi recognise Jón’s moniker. At Jón's cabin, Hildur finds Pétur, who claims oxycodone pills are his. Jón disturbs Freysi, they scuffle. Police remove Pétur. Hildur orders Jón to attend station, tomorrow. Beta greets Florian; Jacob arrives. Hildur delivers Jacob, Florian to share-house. Freysi leaves Pétur with another carer. Jakob watches report of Heiðar announcing hotel project, alongside Leena. Leena refuses Jakob’s unscheduled phone call to Matias. Tinna to Hildur: town knows you are romancing Freysi. Hildur, Tinna attend her sisters' memorial. Pétur steals quad bike, drives towards cabin. Freysi injects himself before Hildur visits. They have sex; she refuses to sleepover. Dream: Hildur approaches tunnel; her sisters walk along. Present: Hildur asks Hreinn: allow her through roadblock. Hreinn: another avalanche, due. Beta arrives with trainees. Police extract Pétur from Jón's car. Hildur discovers Jon’s corpse.
2	"The Car" (Auto)	Tinna Hrafnsdóttir	Matti Laine, Margrét Örnólfsdóttir, Satu Rämö	26 January 2026
Hákon removes Jón's corpse to Reykjavík. Florian steals Jón's oxycodone pills. At airport, Leena greets Sarita. Pétur initially refuses to talk. Hildur takes phone call; Florian bribes Pétur with oxycodone. Hildur: check on Kormákur, whom Jón last phoned. Pétur to Hildur: went to cabin to get pills. Flashback: Pétur hears Jón begging, while tied to chair; cannot see assailant. Pétur runs to Jón's car. Assailant leaves, avalanche buries car. Present: Pétur cannot recognise Kormákur. Kormákur brandishes shotgun at police and Sandra. Jakob talks down Kormákur. Hildur retrieves handgun from jeep's safe. Jakob to Kormákur: lost temper during lawyer meeting; ex-wife gained custody. Kormákur: had sex with Sandra, last night. Kormákur surrenders. Heiðar hears about Jón's unsolved murder; plans Westfjords journey. Jónas to Hildur: Magnús said flawed search for sisters. Florian throws oxycodone away. Hakon: Jón killed by single throat cut; fancy lace shoved down throat. Using Tinna's old map, Hildur discovers alternate path from cabin. Jakob drives to Flateyri. Leena hands phone to Matias. Jakob sees Matias at window. Hildur to Beta: CCTV of car along old mountain path. Neighbour Salmar to Hildur: car’s owner staying in Florida. Heiðar has sex with Lára. Heiðar is killed by car’s driver.
3	"Reykjavik" (Reykjavik)	Tinna Hrafnsdóttir	Matti Laine, Margrét Örnólfsdóttir, Satu Rämö	26 January 2026
Driver sets car alight upon hearing police identified it. Beta informs Florian: budget cannot afford him. Anton: Pétur's opioid levels increased after Hildur’s visit; Pétur wants Florian. Freysi to Hildur: feeling unwell. Hildur, Jakob fly to Reykjavík. Florian to Beta: father arranged funding. Hákon to Hildur: Jón's autopsy delayed by Heiðar's corpse. Jakob recognises Heiðar. Hildur phones Magnús, who refuses to help. Tumi to Hildur: owner kept car, with key, in unlocked garage. Jakob: car has frontside dent. Hildur directs Hákon: check Heiðar's throat, who finds lace matching Jón's. Both inserted post mortem using pliers. Hildur to Jóhanna: same murderer from Westfjords. Hildur, Jakob encounter Jóhanna and Leena, latter is shocked seeing Jakob. Jóhanna to Hildur: leave Heiðar to Reykjavík police. Magnús relents, tells Hildur: dog trailed sisters into tunnel, but scent disappeared. Magnús: workers still finishing off tunnel. Olgeir lies: all work had finished. Leena refuses to meet Jakob. Florian receives Tumi's email about Jón's computer, phone. Gabríela visits Freysi; his DNA result: Elva's not his biological mother. Hildur, Jakob miss return flight. Hildur tells Jakob about sisters’ disappearance. Florian identifies Freysi, then a child, photographed sitting with Jón. Due to late hour Hildur, Jakob share Hákon's spare bedroom.
4	"Freysi" (Freysi)	Tinna Hrafnsdóttir	Matti Laine, Margrét Örnólfsdóttir, Satu Rämö	2 February 2026
Hildur remembers parents died a year after sisters disappeared. Freysi confronts Elva over his parentage. Anna videophones Jakob, when Hildur enters wearing only a towel: Anna hangs up. Florian to Beta: photos on Jón's phone of Pétur and Freysi. Beta sends Hreinn, Florian to arrest Freysi. Kolfinna: ask business partner, Ketill about Heiðar’s affairs. Hildur, Jakob approach Ketill with Leena. Jakob, Leena argue about her taking Matias from Finland. Lára: had affair with Heiðar, he was not fearful; his former lover was Valgerður. Freysi asks Tinna: any teen mothers from school? Tinna: yes, Ingibjörg. Freysi photographs Ingibjörg. Tinna realises Freysi's not well: hugs him. Aboard plane, Hildur has premonition of disaster. Anton to Florian: someone gave Pétur opioid after being admitted. Upon landing, Hildur hears Freysi phone message: “I love you”. Beta to Hildur: suspect Freysi of murders; will arrest him. Police search Freysi's home, Jakob finds DNA results, Hildur discovers used syringe. Beta: Freysi called in at work, took torch. Hildur to police: Freysi's going jogging. Hildur arrives at carpark: follows Freysi's path. Hreinn sends Jakob after Hildur. Freysi stops for body laying down; person hits Freysi with rock. Hildur sees body thrown over fence: its Freysi's corpse.
5	"Secrets" (Salaisuudet)	Tinna Hrafnsdóttir	Matti Laine, Margrét Örnólfsdóttir, Satu Rämö	9 February 2026
Police follow footprints verging from path to shoreline: killer escaped by water. Lísa excited about inheritance: another cabin. Beta: lace in Freysi's throat. Florian: Freysi called Gabriela; recently took photo of woman's photo. Tinna arrives to take hyperactive Hildur home. Tinna: Freysi interested in Ingibjörg. Beta directs Hreinn, Jakob to ask locals about Ingibjörg; assigns Florian to online information. Jakob to Anna: shared room with Hildur. Florian blackmails Kormákur into obtaining opioids. Hildur finds Gabriela in Freysi's room. Jakob to Beta: choir member remembered Ingibjörg's family moved to America. Hreinn: check neighbouring congregations. Gabríela: Freysi had hereditary, neurodegenerative illness; treated by injections. Jakob in Flateyri, asks residents about Ingibjörg. Elva to Hildur, Beta: unofficial adoption of Ingibjörg's baby; Ingibjörg raped by Jón. Beta to Hildur: Jóhanna will take over the case. Jakob stops in tunnel, notices wall was repaired; phones Hildur. Lísa flies into Ísafjörður. Florian confesses to Beta: he bought drugs. Beta helps him. After seeing the wall, Hildur confronts Olgeir, who finally admits repairs were done. Olgeir hired local stonemason, Jón who had key, lived on Flateyri side. Sarita agrees to meet Jakob. Hildur, Jakob search Jón's old house. Hildur finds sisters' seahorse keychains. Bones also discovered.
6	"The Sisters" (Siskot)	Tinna Hrafnsdóttir	Matti Laine, Margrét Örnólfsdóttir, Satu Rämö	16 February 2026
Flashback: In tunnel, Jón coaxes Rósa, Björk into his car. Present: Florian: left Dortmund after diabetic prisoner died during his watch; father arranged Iceland transfer. Hildur asks Jóhanna: keep her on investigation. Jakob: Ingibjörg died two years ago. Sarita: give Jakob access to Matias behind Leena's back. Hildur: Heiðar wrote eulogy for Valgerður. Beta: Valgerður suicided after baby died. Hreinn: Marta is Valgerður's mother. Marta: cot death baby. Kolfinna to Jóhanna: Heiðar was adopted. Beta sends Florian to Edinburgh rehab clinic. Anton: Valgerður's baby died of same genetic condition as Freysi. Marta takes Lisa to cabin. Jóhanna: Heiðar's birth mother was Helga. Helga to Hildur: raped by Jón, only told Marta; find Heiðar's twin sister, Lísa. Hildur discovers Marta's plans detailing murder victims. Jakob: Lísa flew in yesterday. Hildur: Marta has another cabin. Lísa sees bridal dress with pieces missing. Marta drags unconscious Lísa to cliff edge. Hildur, Jakob arrive. Hildur to Marta: genetic condition is treatable. Marta jumps off cliff; Lísa survives. Leena takes photos when Sarita brings Matias to Jakob. Jakob gives Hildur hand-knitted jumper. Anna arrives, hugs Jakob. Hildur sings. Leena videophones Jakob: leaving Iceland after unauthorised visitation with Matias. Hákon to Hildur: not human bones, but sheep.
