= List of submissions to the 70th Academy Awards for Best Foreign Language Film =

1997 Best Foreign Language Film submissions

Highlights
- Oscar winner: (Netherlands) Character
- Submissions: 44
- Debuts: 3
- Total eligible: 44

This is a list of submissions to the 70th Academy Awards for the Best Foreign Language Film. The Academy of Motion Picture Arts and Sciences (AMPAS) has invited the film industries of various countries to submit their best film for the Academy Award for Best Foreign Language Film every year since the award was created in 1956. The award is presented annually by the Academy to a feature-length motion picture produced outside the United States that contains primarily non-English dialogue. The Foreign Language Film Award Committee oversees the process and reviews all the submitted films.

For the 70th Academy Awards, the submitted motion pictures must have first been released theatrically in their respective countries between 1 November 1996 and 31 October 1997. The deadline for submissions to the Academy was 3 November 1997. 44 countries submitted films and were found to be eligible by AMPAS and screened for voters. The Democratic Republic of the Congo, Luxembourg and Ukraine submitted films for the first time. The five nominees were announced on 10 February 1998.

The Netherlands won the award for the third time with Character by Mike van Diem.

== Submissions ==
Submitting country	Film title used in nomination	Original title	Language(s)	Director(s)	Result
Argentina	Ashes of Paradise	Cenizas del paraíso	Spanish	Marcelo Piñeyro	Not nominated
Austria	The Unfish	Der Unfisch	German	Robert Dornhelm	Not nominated
Belgium	My Life in Pink	Ma vie en rose	French	Alain Berliner	Not nominated
Brazil	Four Days in September	O Que É Isso, Companheiro?	Brazilian Portuguese, English	Bruno Barreto	Nominated
Canada	Cosmos		French, English	Jennifer Alleyn, Manon Briand, Marie-Julie Dallaire, Arto Paragamian, André Turpin and Denis Villeneuve	Not nominated
Colombia	The Debt	La deuda	Spanish	Manuel José Álvarez and Nicolás Buenaventura	Not nominated
Croatia	Lapitch the Little Shoemaker	Čudnovate zgode šegrta Hlapića	Croatian, Dutch, English, German	Milan Blažeković	Not nominated
Cuba	Vertical Love	Amor vertical	Spanish	Arturo Sotto Díaz	Not nominated
Czech Republic	A Forgotten Light	Zapomenuté světlo	Czech	Vladimír Michálek	Not nominated
Democratic Republic of the Congo	Macadam Tribe	Macadam tribu	French	Zeka Laplaine	Not nominated
Denmark	Barbara		Danish, Faroese, Norwegian, French	Nils Malmros	Not nominated
Egypt	Destiny	المصير / Le Destin	Arabic, French, Spanish	Youssef Chahine	Not nominated
Finland	The Collector	Neitoperho	Finnish	Auli Mantila	Not nominated
France	Western		French	Manuel Poirier	Not nominated
Germany	Beyond Silence	Jenseits der Stille	German, German Sign Language, English, Spanish	Caroline Link	Nominated
Greece	Slaughter of the Cock	Η Σφαγή του Κόκορα	Greek, Cypriot Greek, English, Ancient Greek	Andreas Pantzis	Not nominated
Hungary	The Witman Boys	Witman fiúk	Hungarian	János Szász	Not nominated
Iceland	Blossi/810551		Icelandic	Júlíus Kemp	Not nominated
India	Guru	ഗുരു	Malayalam	Rajeev Anchal	Not nominated
Iran	Gabbeh	گبه	Persian, Qashqai	Mohsen Makhmalbaf	Not nominated
Israel	Pick a Card	עפולה אקספרס	Hebrew, English	Julie Shles	Not nominated
Italy	The Best Man	Il testimone dello sposo	Italian	Pupi Avati	Not nominated
Japan	Princess Mononoke	もののけ姫	Japanese	Hayao Miyazaki	Not nominated
Luxembourg	Women	Elles	French, Portuguese	Luís Galvão Teles	Not nominated
(North Macedonia) Macedonia	Gypsy Magic	Џипси меџик	Balkan Romani, English, Macedonian, Hindi	Stole Popov	Not nominated
Mexico	Deep Crimson	Profundo carmesí	Spanish	Arturo Ripstein	Not nominated
Netherlands	Character	Karakter	Dutch, German, French	Mike van Diem	Won Academy Award
Norway	Junk Mail	Budbringeren	Norwegian	Pål Sletaune	Not nominated
Philippines	Milagros		Filipino	Marilou Diaz-Abaya	Not nominated
Poland	Love Stories	Historie miłosne	Polish	Jerzy Stuhr	Not nominated
Portugal	Journey to the Beginning of the World	Voyage au début du monde / Viagem ao Princípio do Mundo	French, Portuguese	Manoel de Oliveira	Not nominated
Russia	The Thief	Вор	Russian	Pavel Chukhray	Nominated
Slovakia	Orbis Pictus		Slovak	Martin Šulík	Not nominated
Slovenia	Outsider	Avtsajder	Slovene, Bosnian	Andrej Košak	Not nominated
South Africa	The Clown	Paljas	Afrikaans	Katinka Heyns	Not nominated
Spain	Secrets of the Heart	Secretos del corazón	Spanish	Montxo Armendáriz	Nominated
Sweden	Tic Tac		Swedish, Italian	Daniel Alfredson	Not nominated
Switzerland	For Ever Mozart		French, Bosnian	Jean-Luc Godard	Not nominated
Taiwan	Yours and Mine	我的神經病	Mandarin, Taiwanese Hokkien	Wang Shaudi	Not nominated
Thailand	Daughter 2	เสียดาย 2	Thai	Chatrichalerm Yukol	Not nominated
Turkey	The Bandit	Eşkıya	Turkish	Yavuz Turgul	Not nominated
Ukraine	A Friend of the Deceased	Приятель покойника / Приятель небіжчика	Russian, Ukrainian, English	Viacheslav Kryshtofovych	Not nominated
Venezuela	One Life and Two Trails	Una vida y dos mandados	Spanish	Alberto Arvelo	Not nominated
FR Yugoslavia	Three Summer Days	Три летња дана	Serbian	Mirjana Vukomanović	Not nominated

== Notes ==
- The Netherlands originally submitted All Stars by Jean van de Velde. However, the filmmakers withdrew the film from consideration in support of Character by Mike van Diem, which would eventually be submitted and go on to win Best Foreign Language Film.
