= Blossi/810551 =

1997 film

- Film poster
- Directed by: Júlíus Kemp
- Written by: Lars Emil Árnason
- Starring: Páll Banine
- Release date: 17 August 1997
- Running time: 82 minutes
- Country: Iceland
- Language: Icelandic

Blossi/810551 is a 1997 Icelandic drama film directed by Júlíus Kemp. The film was selected as the Icelandic entry for the Best Foreign Language Film at the 70th Academy Awards, but was not accepted as a nominee.

== Cast ==
- Páll Banine as Robbi
- Þóra Dungal as Stella
- Finnur Jóhannsson as Ulfur
- Jón Gnarr as Crazy Radio Caller

== See also ==
- List of submissions to the 70th Academy Awards for Best Foreign Language Film
- List of Icelandic submissions for the Academy Award for Best Foreign Language Film
