= Niceland =

Niceland may refer to:

- Niceland (band), a 1983 Icelandic heavy metal band
- Niceland (Population. 1.000.002), a 2004 Icelandic film
- Niceland Seafood
- The setting of the fictional game Fix-It Felix Jr. in the 2012 film Wreck-It Ralph
