= Þorsteinn Bachmann =

Icelandic film actor

Þorsteinn Bachmann is an Icelandic actor. He is known for his role as Móri in Life in a Fishbowl for which he won an Edda Award in 2015.

== Early life and education ==
Þorsteinn Bachmann grew up in the Fossvogur area of Reykjavík, Iceland before moving to Breiðholt when he was 10 years old. He did not do well in school in the early years; he was barely able to read or write before changing schools from Fossvogur to the one in Breiðholt.

Þorsteinn graduated from the Icelandic Drama School in 1991.

== Career ==
Þorsteinn has worked with theatre groups in Reykjavík and Akureyri, and was president of the latter for a few years. He has also taught many acting courses, and has served as a teacher at both the Icelandic Drama School and the Icelandic Film School.

In 2013, he worked with the National Theatre of Iceland.

== Personal life ==
Before every premiere, Þorsteinn goes to the gym, goes swimming and finishes off with a sauna. "This is something I've always done and goes with every film or stage premiere".

== Selected filmography ==
- Íslenski draumurinn (English title The Icelandic Dream) (2000)
- A Man Like Me (English title A Man Like Me) (2002)
- Strákarnir okkar (English title Eleven Men Out) (2005)
- Blóðbönd (English title Thicker Than Water) (2006)
- The Quiet Storm (2007)
- Volcano (2011)
- Stormland (2011)
- Either Way (2011)
- Life in a Fishbowl (2014)
- Trapped (2015-2016)
- The Oath (2016)
- Under the Tree (2017)
- Tom of Finland (2017)
- And Breathe Normally (2018)
- Let Me Fall (2018)
- The County (2019)
- Agnes Joy (2019)
- Katla (2021)
- True Detective (2024)

== Awards ==
| Year | Award | Category | Work | Result | Notes |
|---|---|---|---|---|---|
| 2005 | Edda Award | Best Supporting Actor | Strákarnir Okkar | Nominated | |
| 2007 | Edda Award | Best Supporting Actor | Veðramót | Nominated | |
| 2011 | Edda Award | Best Supporting Actor | Órói | Won | |
| 2012 | Edda Award | Best Supporting Actor | Eldfjall | Nominated | Nominated twice in the same category. |
| 2012 | Edda Award | Best Supporting Actor | Á annan veg | Won | Nominated twice in the same category. |
| 2013 | Edda Award | Best Supporting Actor | Pressa | Nominated | |
| 2015 | Edda Award | Best Actor | Life in a Fishbowl | Won | |
| 2015 | Gríma Award | Best Actor | Endatafl | Nominated | Gríman is the Icelandic Award for achievements in theatre. |
