= Oliver Luckett =

American entrepreneur (born 1974)

- Born: 1974 (age 51–52); Mississippi
- Education: Vanderbilt University
- Occupation: entrepreneur

William Oliver Luckett (born 1974) is an American entrepreneur. He founded Revver, DigiSynd, and theAudience, all of which have since been sold. He currently lives in Iceland, where he heads the marketing startup, EFNI.

== Early life and education ==
Luckett grew up in Clarksdale, Mississippi. He attended Vanderbilt University, where he received a BA in French literature in 1996. His father, Bill, co-owned the Ground Zero blues club with actor Morgan Freeman.

== Career ==
After graduating from Vanderbilt, Luckett moved to San Francisco. He began working at telecommunications provider Qwest, rising to the position of chief IP services architect. He left the company in 1999 to co-found the wireless data broadcasting network iBlast with television entrepreneur Michael Lambert. Luckett departed the company after three years and traveled in Spain. He returned to L.A. in 2003 and worked at Declare Yourself, a nonpartisan, nonprofit online voter-registration initiative established by television producer and philanthropist Norman Lear.

In 2005, Luckett founded Revver, a company which gave users a percentage of advertising revenue for uploading their video clips. Investors included Comcast Interactive Capital and Turner Broadcasting. The Revver platform hosted Eepybird's viral video, "Extreme Mentos and Diet Coke." Revver was sold to LiveUniverse in 2008 for $5 million.

In 2007, Luckett established DigiSynd with funding from companies including Greycroft Partners and Warner Bros. The company outsourced packaging, syndication and marketing to traditional content providers. The Walt Disney Company acquired the firm in 2008 for an undisclosed sum, retaining Luckett as senior vice president and general manager of the DigiSynd subsidiary. DigiSynd assumed control for Disney's brand presence across social media, managing campaigns for Disney Studios, Disney Animation Studios and Disney Parks and Resorts.

Luckett was recognized for spearheading the marketing campaign for the 2010 Disney film Toy Story 3, which became the then top-grossing animated feature of all time and the highest-grossing film of the year.

In 2011, Luckett left Disney to found the social media publishing firm theAudience, which received backing from American talent agency William Morris Endeavor, Guggenheim Partners, and entrepreneur Sean Parker. The company worked with social media influencers to run coordinated digital campaigns for clients such as 20th Century Fox, Sony Pictures, McDonald's and Ford Motor Co. TheAudience also developed content and artwork, such as the viral music video for The Chainsmokers 2014 song #Selfie. In September 2015, it was announced that theAudience was sold for an undisclosed sum to the Dubai-based conglomerate Al Ahli Holding Group.

Luckett and his work at theAudience were featured in the 2014 PBS Frontline report, "Generation Like."

In 2015, Luckett co-founded the Reykjavík-based marketing startup EFNI with Icelandic politician and entrepreneur Heiða Kristín Helgadóttir. EFNI has launched the Icelandic companies Niceland Seafood, HausMart, and Reykjavik Greens. Revolutionizing the seafood industry, Niceland has done US$36 million in revenue. In 2020, Luckett founded Ilex Organics which partnered with Yaupon Tea.

== Publications ==
Along with Michael J. Casey, Luckett co-wrote the 2016 Hachette book The Social Organism: A Radical Understanding of Social Media to Transform Your Business and Life. The authors argue that social media functions on every level like a living organism. Kirkus Reviews described the book as "a manifesto of sorts, proclaiming that the ubiquity of social media is not necessarily the end of the world." The futurist Ray Kurzweil praised the book as "an indispensable guide for business leaders, marketing professionals, and anyone serious about understanding our digital world — a guide not just to social media, but to human life today and where it is headed next."

== Personal life ==
In June 2017 Luckett married Scott Guinn, a chef in Iceland. They live in Seltjarnarnes, Iceland, outside Reykjavík.

Luckett is known as an art collector. His collection includes many works by Icelandic artists and American street artists. Luckett and Guinn live in a former museum with their fifteen-hundred-piece art collection. It contains many works of art including a life-size mirrored wolf sculpture by Arran Gregory, an acrylic on canvas titled Warhol, by ThankYouX, pieces by Anthony Lister and JR, and a piece by London-based artist and designer Daniel Lismore.
