= Sagafilm =

- Industry: Film
- Founded: 1978; 48 years ago
- Headquarters: Reykjavík, Iceland
- Products: Commercials, Motion pictures, television films, TV Shows
- Website: sagafilm.is

Sagafilm is an Icelandic production company for TV, commercials and feature films. It was founded in 1978 and is the oldest film production company in Iceland.

== Documentaries ==
- Out of Thin Air (2017)
- Raise the Bar (2021)

== Films ==
- The House (1983)
- Cold Trail (2006)
- Bjarnfreðarson (2009)
- Fish Out of Water (2013)
- Dead Snow 2: Red vs. Dead (2014)
- The Falcons (2017)

== TV shows ==
- Svartir Englar (2008)
- The Press (2008-2011)
- Næturvaktin (2007)
- Dagvaktin (2008)
- Fangavaktin (2009)
- The Court (2010-2011)
- World's End (2011)
- Case (2015)
- Stella Blómkvist (2017-2021)
- The Flatey Enigma (2018)
- The Minister (2020)
- Thin Ice (2020)
- Hildur (2026)
