= Heiða Kristín Helgadóttir =

Icelandic politician and entrepreneur

Personal details
- Born: April 20, 1983 (age 43)
- Party: Best Party; Bright Future
- Spouse: Guðmundur Kristján Jónsson
- Children: 2

Heiða Kristin Helgadóttir (born 20 April 1983) is an Icelandic politician and entrepreneur. She founded and led two political parties: the Best Party and Bright Future.

== Early life and education ==
Heiða was born in Washington, D.C. in the United States. She earned a BA in political science from the University of Iceland.

== Career ==
After graduating from university, Heiða worked in an artificial intelligence laboratory. While there her friend Gaukur Úlfarsson introduced her to the comedian Jón Gnarr. Amid the Icelandic financial crisis they created the Best Party in 2009 with the original intention to parody political practices in Iceland. In 2010, Heiða ran the Best Party's campaign in Reykjavik's election, resulting in a shock win which made Jón mayor of the city. During Jón's tenure as Reykjavik mayor, which ended in 2014, Heiða was his close confidante and advisor and served as CEO of the Best Party.

In 2012, Heiða founded the political party Bright Future, the successor to the Best Party, with Guðmundur Steingrímsson. She served as chairman of the party from its founding through December 2014. In the Bright Future's first election in April 2013, the party received 8.2% of the general vote, giving it six out of the 63 seats in Iceland's parliament. In 2015, Heiða served as a parliamentarian for Bright Future in place of her colleague Björt Ólafsdóttir while she was on maternity leave.

In 2015, Heiða hosted a weekly political news show on Iceland's Channel 2.

In 2015, Heiða co-founded the Reykjavík-based startup incubator and marketing firm EFNI with American entrepreneur Oliver Luckett. They are the co-founders of Niceland Seafood.

== Personal life ==
Heiða is the mother of three children. She is married to Guðmundur Kristján Jónsson.
