= Fangavaktin =

Icelandic television series

- Genre: Situation comedy
- Written by: Jóhann Ævar Grímsson; Jón Gnarr; Jörundur Ragnarsson; Pétur Jóhann Sigfússon; Ragnar Bragason
- Directed by: Ragnar Bragason
- Starring: Jón Gnarr; Jörundur Ragnarsson; Pétur Jóhann Sigfússon; Ólafía Hrönn Jónsdóttir
- Country of origin: Iceland
- Original language: Icelandic
- No. of seasons: 1
- No. of episodes: 7

Production
- Editor: Sverrir Kristjánsson
- Running time: 25 min.
- Production company: Sagafilm

Original release
- Network: Stöð 2

Fangavaktin (English: The Prison Shift) is the sequel to the Icelandic television series Dagvaktin and the final series in the trilogy. The three main characters from Næturvaktin, Georg Bjarnfreðarson (Jón Gnarr), Ólafur Ragnar (Pétur Jóhann Sigfússon) and Daníel (Jörundur Ragnarsson), have become imprisoned in the infamous Litla-Hraun prison following the murder of the hotel owner in Dagvaktin. The story is continued, and brought to a conclusion, in the feature film Bjarnfreðarson.

The first episode was broadcast on Stöð 2 on Sunday, 27 September 2009, and an episode was broadcast each following Sunday until the final seventh episode aired on 8 November 2009. The series has been released on DVD.

== Cast ==
- Jón Gnarr as Georg Bjarnfreðarson
- Pétur Jóhann Sigfússon as Ólafur Ragnar
- Jörundur Ragnarsson as Daníel
- Björn Thors as Kenneth Máni
- Ólafur Darri Ólafsson
- Ingvar Sigurðsson as Viggó
