= The Quiet Storm (film) =

2007 film

- Directed by: Guðný Halldórsdóttir
- Written by: Guðný Halldórsdóttir
- Produced by: Halldór Þorgeirsson
- Starring: Tinna Hrafnsdóttir
- Cinematography: Svein Krøvel
- Release date: 7 September 2007
- Running time: 102 minutes
- Country: Iceland
- Language: Icelandic

The Quiet Storm (Icelandic: Veðramót) is a 2007 Icelandic drama film written and directed by Guðný Halldórsdóttir. It was entered into the 30th Moscow International Film Festival.

== Cast ==
- Tinna Hrafnsdóttir
- Hilmir Snær Guðnason
- Hera Hilmar (as Hera Hilmarsdóttir)
- Atli Rafn Sigurðsson
- Jörundur Ragnarsson
- Gunnur Martinsdóttir Schlüter as Eyja
- Baltasar Breki Baltasarsson as Diddi
- Arnmundur Ernst Björnsson as Otti
- Þorsteinn Bachmann as Keli
- Thórey Sigthórsdóttir as Dísa eldri
