= A Man Like Me =

2002 Icelandic film by Róbert Ingi Douglas

- Directed by: Róbert I. Douglas
- Written by: Árni Ásgeirsson; Róbert I. Douglas
- Produced by: Júlíus Kemp
- Starring: Jón Gnarr; Stephanie Che; Maria Ellingsen; Þorsteinn Guðmundsson; Sigurður Sigurjónsson; Þorsteinn Bachmann; Þórunn Erna Clausen
- Cinematography: Pawel Gula
- Edited by: Sigvaldi J. Kárason
- Music by: Jóhann Jóhannsson
- Release date: 2002
- Running time: 90 mins
- Country: Iceland
- Language: Icelandic

A Man Like Me (Icelandic: Maður eins og ég) is a 2002 romantic comedy about the life of "Júlli" (Jón Gnarr), a lonely and confused man who is searching for some sense in his life. Surprisingly he meets a young woman from China (Stephanie Che) who changes his life dramatically. He falls in love with her but ruins the relationship because of his insecurity and his previous bad experiences. When he comes out of his disappointments and his depression that follow the breakup of the relationship, he decides to do everything in his power to change what has happened and get a second chance.
