= Næturvaktin =

- Promotional poster
- Genre: Situation comedy
- Written by: Jóhann Ævar Grímsson; Jón Gnarr; Jörundur Ragnarsson; Pétur Jóhann Sigfússon; Ragnar Bragason
- Directed by: Ragnar Bragason
- Starring: Jón Gnarr; Jörundur Ragnarsson; Pétur Jóhann Sigfússon; Sara Margrét Nordahl Michaelsdóttir
- Country of origin: Iceland
- Original language: Icelandic
- No. of seasons: 1
- No. of episodes: 12

Production
- Editor: Sverrir Kristjánsson
- Running time: 25 min.
- Production company: Sagafilm

Original release
- Network: Stöð 2
- Release: 16 September – 9 December 2007

Næturvaktin (transl. The Night Shift) is an Icelandic television series. It is the first in a trilogy, its sequels being Dagvaktin (transl. The Day Shift) and Fangavaktin (transl. The Prison Shift). The series was first shown in 2007 on Stöð 2, on Sundays from 16 September to 9 December. In the same year, the series won an Edda Award for Best TV Series. It was also selected The Most Popular TV Series by a direct audience vote.

A film, Bjarnfreðarson, concluding the trilogy, premièred in December 2009. It was met with wide success in Iceland, beating Avatar at the box office on its opening weekend. It was watched by over 20% of the Icelandic population, a record for an Icelandic film, and was nominated for 11 Edda Awards.

== Background ==
Næturvaktin revolves around the lives of three employees working at a petrol station on Laugavegur in Reykjavík. The eccentric, immature, egotistical supervisor and communist Georg Bjarnfreðarson (Jón Gnarr), has a fond admiration for Sweden and Swedish culture, and is the focus of the series. Ólafur Ragnar Hannesson (Pétur Jóhann Sigfússon) is a regular employee and a dimwitted, well-meaning man who likes to party and dreams of becoming a successful band manager. Daníel Sævarsson (Jörundur Ragnarsson) is a former medical student who starts working at the petrol station at the beginning of the series in hopes of getting his controlling parents off his back and find himself.

The series follows the various happenings at the petrol station, as the power-hungry Georg orders Ólafur and Daníel to do inane, unusual and sometimes dangerous jobs. For example, in one episode, Georg stages an assault on the petrol station with Ólafur as the assailant. This very quickly results in his injury as Georg sprays him in the eyes with antifreeze and wrestles him to the ground. Georg uses his catchphrase, "it was just a misunderstanding", to explain the staged assault to the area manager. Georg's "misunderstandings" are not limited to his colleagues, as later on in the series he gets into conflict with customers over use of the toilet in the forecourt shop and the deposit of cans in the recycling bin on the forecourt.

== Characters ==
=== Georg Bjarnfreðarson ===
Georg Bjarnfreðarson (Jón Gnarr) is the eccentric nightshift manager at the Shell garage on Laugavegur, the main road through downtown Reykjavík. He is a power-hungry Communist inspired by Soviet ideals, yet still lives at home with his mother (as we find out in Dagvaktin). He has five degrees: psychology, sociology, pedagogy, political science as well as a teaching qualification and frequently brings them up in attempt to assert his self-importance. A fan of bureaucracy, he enjoys putting his subordinates through ordeals over trivial matters, such as how to spend the staff holiday fund (staging an official vote inline with the general elections). He also is insistent on the use of walkie talkies, addressing his colleagues as "personnel on the forecourt" (another of his catchphrases). He is unable to accept defeat in the face of any situation, no matter how stupid, and ascribes all of his shortcomings to "misunderstandings". He has one son, Flemming Geir, an obese 12-year-old whom he neglects and leaves to steal chocolate from the stockroom.

He is the central focus of the trilogy, and the film Bjarnfreðarson focuses on his upbringing and the reasons for his eccentricity.

=== Ólafur Ragnar Hannesson ===
Ólafur Ragnar Hannesson (Pétur Jóhann Sigfússon) is the longest-standing employee at the petrol station. He has aspirations of becoming a band manager, and is often trying to organize gigs for his friends' band, Sólin ("The Sun"). The band quickly becomes fed up of his inability to book gigs and complete lack of knowledge of the music industry, and dump him as manager. He becomes the subject of mockery from Georg when he enters the Icelandic X Factor in pursuit of his musical ambitions. Extremely dimwitted, Ólafur is often on the receiving end of bad situations, becoming involved in advance-fee fraud with a man from Nigeria, printing misspelled promotional posters for his band, and falling foul of a Chinese protein shake which induces lactation. He is submissive and often follows Georg's instructions, no matter how unusual, without question. Despite his stupidity, however, he is a kind and friendly man who excels at socializing and is even looked up to by Georg's son, Flemming Geir.

=== Daníel Sævarsson ===
Daníel Sævarsson (Jörundur Ragnarsson) is a medical school drop-out who begins working at the petrol station at the beginning of the series. He is shy and introverted, and unsure of what he wants to do with his life. He has anxiety and depression, and has completely cut off all connections with his family. Unlike Ólafur, he recognizes the stupidity in Georg's decisions and often challenges him when things seem unfair. His ex-girlfriend and family appear numerous times in the series, attempting to get him to resume his studies and become a doctor like his father and grandfather. He is bright and is often able to humiliate Georg, for example by identifying a man who has recently had a stroke, whom Georg tars as a drunk and assaults, or simply by pointing out his frequent hypocrisy. To Georg's annoyance, Daniel is much better at chess than he is, managing to beat him on several occasions. He is susceptible to mood swings and storms out whenever Georg makes him sufficiently angry.

Hallgrímur

Hallgrímur (Gunnar Jónsson) is an mentally ill man who lives close to the petrol station and often comes during the night and buys hot dog. It is revealed in one episode that he suffered mental breakdown when he was in university.

== Music ==
The opening song is Kyrrlátt kvöld ("Tranquil Evening") by Icelandic punk band Utangarðsmenn. The song Jón pönkari ("John the Punk") by Bubbi Morthens (a former member of Utangarðsmenn) closes each episode, and is used consistently throughout each series, unlike Kyrrlátt kvöld, which is only used on the first series.

== Foreign adaptations ==
=== Planned US remake ===
In 2009, the American production company Reveille Productions purchased production rights for a remake for the U.S. market, with the Fox Network purchasing broadcasting rights. Howard Owens, the managing director of Reveille, said:

The Night Shift is that rare international format that has American sensibility, and we're eager to tackle another workplace comedy after the success of The Office [...] The show has a smart, ironic point of view, which we know will translate well in the U.S.

In January 2010, the screenplay for the American adaptation was completed by screenwriter Adam Barr. Whether a pilot episode will be made has yet to be decided. Nevertheless, the screenplay includes American adaptations of the characters. Ólafur Ragnar's name has been changed to Tommy, but otherwise his character is the same. The other two main characters have undergone more significant changes, however. The character of Daníel keeps his name and is still a medical school drop-out, but his introverted personality has undergone a complete inversion and – according to Iceland Review – he will be "a hunk playing the field". Georg Bjarnfreðarson's character has undergone a complete transformation, into a survivalist.

=== German adaptation ===
On 31 July 2018, ZDFneo started broadcasting a German adaptation called Tanken - Mehr als Super. Gnarr expressed his annoyance over the German adaptation and accused Icelandic production company Saga Film of copyright violation, since he was not informed about the adaptation and did not get mentioned in the credits as the author of the original series, as well as not getting any money for the remake.

=== Norwegian adaptation ===
In Norway, the series was remade under the name Nattskiftet, starring popular Norwegian comedian Otto Jespersen. It was first broadcast in 2012.

== International broadcasts ==
Næturvaktin began broadcasting in the United Kingdom on BBC Four on 9 May 2011 as part of the channel's Wonders of Iceland series of programmes.

== See also ==
- Dagvaktin
- Fangavaktin
- Bjarnfreðarson
