= Quake (2021 film) =

2021 Icelandic film

- Film poster
- Icelandic: Skjálfti
- Directed by: Tinna Hrafnsdóttir
- Screenplay by: Tinna Hrafnsdóttir
- Based on: Grand Mal by Auður Jónsdóttir
- Produced by: Hlín Jóhannesdóttir
- Starring: Anita Briem; Edda Björgvinsdóttir; Jóhann Sigurðsson
- Edited by: Davíð Alexander Corno; Valdís Óskarsdóttir
- Music by: Páll Ragnar Pálsson; Eðvarð Egilsson
- Release dates: 20 November 2021 (Tallinn); 31 March 2022 (Iceland)
- Running time: 106 minutes
- Country: Iceland
- Language: Icelandic

Quake (Icelandic: Skjálfti) is a 2021 Icelandic drama film written and directed by Tinna Hrafnsdóttir.

Quake tells the story of an author and mother named Saga who, after an epileptic seizure, experiences memory loss at the same time as hidden memories of family secrets begin to resurface.
