= HAM (band) =

Icelandic rock band

- Origin: Iceland
- Genres: Alternative rock, heavy metal
- Years active: 1988–1994; 2001–present
- Members: Sigurjón Kjartansson; Óttarr Proppé; Arnar Geir Ómarsson; S. Björn Blöndal; Flosi Þorgeirsson
- Past members: Hallur Ingólfsson; Ævar Ísberg; Gunnar Hjálmarsson; Jón Egill Eyþórsson; Jóhann Jóhannsson

HAM is an Icelandic rock band formed in 1988. They are often listed as a heavy metal band but have never categorized themselves as such. They have come to be acknowledged as an important part of Icelandic rock history, and are known to command a cult following among many Icelandic rock enthusiasts.

== History ==
HAM's first album was Hold, a controversial record which received no radio airtime. The band's attempt to get into the big league began when they warmed up for The Sugarcubes in five concerts in 1988. The following year they released the album Buffalo Virgin with One Little Indian records, and held several concerts in New York. The album Pleasing the Pirahna was recorded in 1990 but was never released—supposedly another album by the name Pimpmobile was also recorded but remains unreleased.

In 1991–1992, the band participated in the making of the film Sódóma Reykjavík, with singer and guitarist Sigurjón Kjartansson writing most of the soundtrack. HAM's participation in the making of this cult Icelandic classic played a significant part in the band's later notoriety.

The album Saga rokksins was released in 1993, and on 4 June 1994 the band held its last concert in the now defunct night club Tunglið in downtown Reykjavík. The live concert recording was subsequently released as the album Lengi lifi. In 1995, the band's remaining studio recordings were released as the album Dauður hestur (Equus mortuus).

HAM did not perform again until 2001, when it was clear that the German metal band Rammstein would be holding a concert in Iceland that summer. It was rumoured that Sigurjón had spoken of HAM reuniting for a concert if Rammstein were to visit Iceland on tour. The band played in the Gaukur á Stöng bar on 14 June 2001 and then again on 15 June with 5500 people in attendance. The Gaukur á stöng concert was later released as the live album Skert flog.

HAM was to participate in the music festival Reykjavík Rokkar in the summer of 2006 along with The Darkness and Motörhead. The festival was cancelled due to disappointing ticket sales, but HAM instead performed in the NASA club in downtown Reykjavík on 29 June to a packed house. On 28 October that year HAM performed at a North Atlantic music festival in Copenhagen with bands from Denmark, Greenland and the Faroe Islands.

On 6 September 2007, HAM were the final band to play at the 'Minifestival' benefit concert at Iðnó, Reykjavík. Their participation was not advertised until the night of the event.

In July 2008, HAM were the closing act to the Icelandic heavy metal festival "Eistnaflug", where they performed a new song.

HAM participated in the 2011 "Eistnaflug" festival as the closing act and later that year they released their first new album in 16 years, Svik, harmur, dauði (English: Betrayal, Tragedy and Death). In 2017 they released another album Söngvar um Helvíti Mannanna.

HAM performed at the Reykjavik Culture Night, on 19 August 2023, to celebrate the 237th birthday of Reykjavik.

== Other work ==
- Jóhann was particularly prolific. He headed the band Daisy Hill Puppy Farm before joining HAM. He has composed music for the theater, and released solo albums. Flosi has occasionally assisted him with guitar work on these projects. Other bands he has founded include Lhooq, with Pétur Hallgrímsson and Sara Guðmundsdóttir, and Dip with Sugarcubes drummer Sigtryggur Baldursson
- Sigurjón formed Olympia after HAM disbanded in 1994 and released one LP and one EP.
- Óttarr, Björn and Jóhann formed the funk band Funkstraße. It was later joined by Pétur Hallgrímsson (guitar), Óskar Guðjónsson (saxophone), Arnar Geir (drums) and Guðni Finnsson (bass). Sigurjón often sang backing vocals with them when they performed live, along with Magga Stína (from Reptile) and Sara from Lhooq. Flosi played guitar with them on occasion. They featured on the soundtrack for Sódóma Reykjavík, and have released tracks on various compilations.
- Óttarr, Björn, Arnar and Flosi formed the punk band Rass (translation: "Ass"). They have released one album.
- Jóhann and Arnar formed Apparat Organ Quartet. They have released two albums; their first being eponymous and the second titled Polýfónía.
- Hallur Ingólfsson formed the band Bleeding Volcano (who released one album), and then XIII, who have released 3 albums to date. He has also composed for theater.
- Óttarr also sings for Dr Spock

== Albums ==
- 1988: Hold
- 1989: Buffalo Virgin
- 1993: Saga rokksins 1988 - 1993
- 1994: Lengi lifi
- 1995: Dauður hestur
- 2001: CBGB's 7. ágúst 1993
- 2001: Skert flog
- 2011: Svik, harmur og dauði
- 2017: Söngvar um Helvíti Mannanna
- 2020: Chromo Sapiens: Tónlist fyrir Shoplifter

== See also ==
- List of bands from Iceland
