= Remote Control (1992 film) =

1992 Icelandic film by Óskar Jónasson

- Directed by: Óskar Jónasson
- Written by: Óskar Jónasson
- Produced by: Jón Ólafsson
- Starring: Björn Jörundur Friðbjörnsson
- Edited by: Valdís Óskarsdóttir
- Music by: Björk; Sigurjón Kjartansson
- Release date: 1992
- Running time: 78 minutes
- Country: Iceland
- Language: Icelandic

Remote Control (Icelandic: Sódóma Reykjavík is a 1992 Icelandic film directed by Óskar Jónasson in his feature-length directorial debut. The plot is a farce, revolving around the young car mechanic Axel and his adventure in the Reykjavík underworld which starts when his mother insists that he must recover the remote control to her TV. It was screened in the Un Certain Regard section at the 1993 Cannes Film Festival. Since it release, it has gained cult status in Iceland.

The film stars Björn Jörundur Friðbjörnsson as Axel, and features the Icelandic metal band HAM.

== Cast ==
- Björn Jörundur Friðbjörnsson – Axel
- Þórarinn Eyfjörð – Flosi
- Thorarinn Oskar Thorarinsson – Vigfús
- Helga Braga Jónsdóttir – Símastúlka
- Þóra Friðriksdóttir – Mamma
- Margrét Hugrún Gústavsdóttir – Mæja
- Sigurjón Kjartansson – Orri
- Soley Eliasdottir – Unnur
- Óttarr Proppé – Hrólfur
- Ari Matthíasson – Þorbjörn
- Erling Jóhannesson – Arnar
- Pétur Eggerz – Sveinn
- Helgi Björnsson – Moli
- Ólafur Guðmundsson – Árni
- Björn Karlsson – Höddi Feiti
- Rósa Guðný Þórsdóttir – Sonja
- Guðný Helgadóttir – Katrín
- Árni Pétur Guðjónsson – Viggó
- Hjálmar Hjálmarsson – Hjörtur
- Jóhann G. Jóhannsson – Garðar
- Gígja Hilmarsdóttir – Daughter of Moli and Sonja
- Eggert Þorleifsson – Aggi Flinki
- Stefan St. Sigurjonsson – Brjánsi Sýra
- Þröstur Guðbjartsson – Elli
- Steinunn Ólafsdóttir – Afgreiðslustúlka
- Skúli Gautason – Grímur
- Björgúlfur Egilsson – Rótari
- Björn Blöndal – Trommari
- Flosi Þorgeirsson – Gítarleikari
- Baldur Maríusson – Veiðimaður
- Sólveig Stefánsdóttir – Barn
- Ingólfur Þór Guðmundsson – Barn
- Þórir Steingrímsson – Hallvarður
- Þröstur Leó Gunnarsson – Áslákur

== Plot ==
Young man Axel is asked by his mother to retrieve the TV remote control taken by his sister Mæja. Mæja is a party animal and Axel's search for his sister leads him to assorted petty criminals. When Mæja is kidnapped, he has to go to the nightclub Sódóma to rescue her. After talking to some of the club patrons, they think there is a party at Axel's apartment, so go there. In the farcical climax, they carry Axel's sleeping mother out of the apartment and place her in a boat, and Axel has to rescue her.
