= 2010 Icelandic municipal elections =

Icelandic municipal election

← 2006	29 May 2010	2014 →

The Icelandic municipal elections of 2010 were held on 29 May in that year to elect the municipal councils of Iceland.

== Results ==
Party	Seats	+/–
Independence Party	117	-13
Progressive Party	51	+6
Social Democratic Alliance	42	+7
Left-Green Movement	15	+1
Best Party	6	New
Liberal Party	1	-2
Other party lists	186	-23
Independents	94	+1
Total	512	-17
Source: Statistics Iceland, Statistics Iceland

== Reykjavík ==
A new political party called The Best Party (Besti flokkurinn) won the most seats on the council, defeating the established parties.

=== Campaign ===
The Best Party led in the polls in the run up to the election with one survey showing they could win a majority on their own. Among the policies in the party's "best manifesto" were plans for a polar bear for the city's zoo, a Disneyland at Reykjavík Airport, palm trees on the waterfront and free towels at swimming pools. However the leader of the Best Party, comedian Jón Gnarr, said that his party, which had only been founded in November 2009, was serious and his campaign manager said they wanted "to take a stand against a system that is completely ruined".

Political analysts saw the strong support for the Best Party being due to the economic crisis that had taken place since 2008, which had led voters to lose confidence in the traditional political parties. Meanwhile, other politicians called on voters to get serious and avoid putting the city in the "hands of clowns" during a time of economic difficulty. As the election neared a poll showed the Best Party dropped slightly while remaining ahead, with the Independence Party rising, making it unlikely that the Best Party would win a majority.

=== Results ===
The results saw the Best Party become the largest party on the council with 6 of the 15 seats, but short of a majority. They defeated the Independence Party of incumbent mayor Hanna Birna Kristjánsdóttir into second place with 33.6% of the vote, compared to 34.7% for the Best Party. The results were described as "a shock" by the Icelandic Prime Minister Jóhanna Sigurðardóttir, with the leader of the Best Party, Jón Gnarr saying he should now become mayor of Reykjavík.

Gnarr formed a coalition with the Social Democrats and was mayor until June 16, 2014.

Party	Votes	%	Seats	+/–
Best Party	20,666	34.72	6	New
Independence Party	20,006	33.61	5	–2
Social Democratic Alliance	11,344	19.06	3	–1
Left-Green Movement	4,255	7.15	1	–1
Progressive Party	1,629	2.74	0	–1
Reykjavík Candidacy List	681	1.14	0	New
List of Candidates for Honesty	668	1.12	0	New
Liberal Party	274	0.46	0	–1
Total	59,523	100.00	15	0
Valid votes	59,523	94.45		
Invalid/blank votes	3,496	5.55		
Total votes	63,019	100.00		
Registered voters/turnout	85,808	73.44		
