= The House (1983 film) =

1983 film

- Film poster
- Directed by: Egill Eðvarðsson
- Written by: Björn Björnsson; Egill Eðvarðsson; Snorri Þórisson
- Produced by: Jon Thor Hannesson; Snorri Þórisson
- Starring: Lilja Þórisdóttir; Jóhann Sigurðsson; Róbert Arnfinnsson; Þóra Borg; Borgar Garðarsson
- Cinematography: Snorri Þórisson
- Edited by: Egill Eðvarðsson; Snorri Þórisson
- Music by: Thor Baldursson
- Production companies: Pegasus Pictures; Sagafilm
- Release date: 12 March 1983
- Running time: 101 minutes
- Country: Iceland
- Language: Icelandic

The House (Icelandic: Húsið: Trúnaðarmál and Husid) is a 1983 Icelandic mystery horror film directed by Egill Eðvarðsson.

== Cast ==
- Lilja Þórisdóttir as Bjorg (as Lilja Thorisdottir)
- Jóhann Sigurðsson
- Róbert Arnfinnsson
- Þóra Borg
- Borgar Garðarsson
- Helgi Skúlason as The Medium
- Árni Tryggvason
- Helga Ragnheiður Óskarsdóttir as Girl with Violin
- Unnur Berglind Guðmundsdóttir as Young Björg

== Production ==
Director Egill Eðvarðsson co-wrote the screenplay with Björn Björnsson and Snorri Þórisson.

== Accolades ==
The film was selected as the Icelandic entry for the Best Foreign Language Film at the 56th Academy Awards, but was not nominated.

== See also ==
- List of submissions to the 56th Academy Awards for Best Foreign Language Film
- List of Icelandic submissions for the Academy Award for Best Foreign Language Film
