= Niceland Seafood =

Icelandic seafood company operating out of the United States

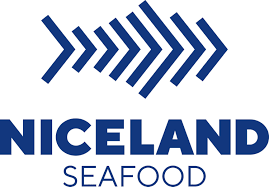
- Industry: Fishing industry
- Founders: Oliver Luckett, Heiða Kristín Helgadóttir
- Headquarters: Reykjavík, Iceland; Denver, United States
- Products: Various seafood products
- Website: nicelandseafood.com

Niceland Seafood is an Icelandic company operating in the United States which produces fish.

== History ==
A visit to Iceland inspired former Head of Innovation at The Walt Disney Company and founder and former CEO of theAudience, Oliver Luckett, to get into the seafood business with his business partner, entrepreneur and Icelandic politician who helped launch the Best Party, Heiða Kristín Helgadóttir. They started an Iceland-based holding company called EFNI in 2015. In June 2018, Luckett and Helgadottir together launched Niceland Seafood, which is backed by EFNI and Iceland-based investment firm Eyrir Invest.

== Operations ==
Niceland’s digital tracing technology allows consumers to follow the detailed journey of each fish, including the location where the fish was caught or raised, the name of the boat that caught it or farm that produced it, the processing plant that filleted the fish, transport details, and the distributor that delivered it to the end destination.

The company is attempting to inhibit the effects of seafood fraud with this technology.

== Partnerships ==
Niceland began with one wholesale partner in Denver, Seattle Fish Co.

== Sustainability ==
All of the wild-caught fish Niceland sources are certified sustainable by the Marine Stewardship council, and the farm-raised fish are certified sustainable by the Aquaculture Stewardship Council.
