= The Last Farm =

- Directed by: Rúnar Rúnarsson
- Written by: Rúnar Rúnarsson
- Produced by: Friðrik Þór Friðriksson; Skuli Fr. Malmquist; Þórir Snær Sigurjónsson
- Starring: Jón Sigurbjörnsson; Kristjana Vagnsdóttir; Ólafía Hrönn Jónsdóttir
- Cinematography: Magni Ágústsson
- Edited by: Sigurbjörg Jónsdóttir
- Music by: Kjartan Sveinsson
- Production company: Zik Zak Filmworks
- Release date: 2004
- Running time: 18 minutes
- Country: Iceland
- Language: Icelandic

The Last Farm (Icelandic: Síðasti bærinn) is a 2004 Icelandic short drama film written and directed by Rúnar Rúnarsson. It stars Jón Sigurbjörnsson, Kristjana Vagnsdóttir, and Ólafía Hrönn Jónsdóttir.

The film was nominated for the 2005 Academy Award for Best Live Action Short Film.

== Plot ==
Lilja, the daughter of elderly farmer Hrafn and his wife Gróa, has decided that her parents should retire to a nursing home in the city. Hrafn convinces Lilja and local postman Jón that he has been working tirelessly due to the impending winter, hoping to finish some final chores at his remote farmhouse before he retires with Gróa; unbeknownst to anyone but Hrafn, Gróa recently died, and Hrafn has been preparing a grave for them both as he does not want to live without her. Lilja and family members arrive at the farmhouse some time later to take her parents to the city, only to find that Hrafn has already built a coffin for Gróa, put her body in it, dug the double grave, laid down next to the coffin, and buried himself alive by pulling a rope which caused dirt to fill the grave.

== Cast ==
- Jón Sigurbjörnsson as Hrafn
- Kristjana Vagnsdóttir as Gróa
- Ólafía Hrönn Jónsdóttir as Lilja
- Kjartan Bjargmundsson as Unnar
- Arnheiður Steinþórsdóttir as Birta
- Siguður Skúlason as Jón

== Production ==
The film was shot at an abandoned farm in the Westfjords of Iceland. It was scored by Kjartan Sveinsson, best known as the keyboardist for the rock band Sigur Rós.

== Reception and accolades ==
The film was nominated for the 2005 Academy Award for Best Live Action Short Film. It won 12 other awards, including the 2004 Edda Award for Short Film of the Year, the ARTE Short Film Award and the Youth Jury Award at the 2006 Dresden Film Festival, and the Audience Award for Best Film at the 2006 FEST Youth Video and Film Festival.
