= This Is Sanlitun =

2013 film

- Directed by: Róbert Ingi Douglas
- Written by: Róbert Ingi Douglas; Carlos Ottery; Christopher Loton
- Starring: Carlos Ottery
- Cinematography: Matthew Zhao Zuxiang
- Release date: 10 September 2013 (TIFF)
- Running time: 94 minutes
- Countries: China; Iceland; Ireland
- Languages: English; Mandarin

This Is Sanlitun is a 2013 comedy film directed by Róbert Ingi Douglas and starring Carlos Ottery. It is a co-production between China, Iceland and Ireland. The film was screened in the Contemporary World Cinema section at the 2013 Toronto International Film Festival.

== Plot ==
The film is a mockumentary about Gary, a British man who arrives in Beijing to set up a business and reconnect with his ex-wife.

== Cast ==
- Carlos Ottery as Gary
- Christopher Loton as Frank
- Ai Wan as Lin
- Cromwell Cheung as Wang Ke
- David Kenneth Vaughan as Jonathan Taylor-Sharpe
