= Óttarr Proppé =

Icelandic politician and musician

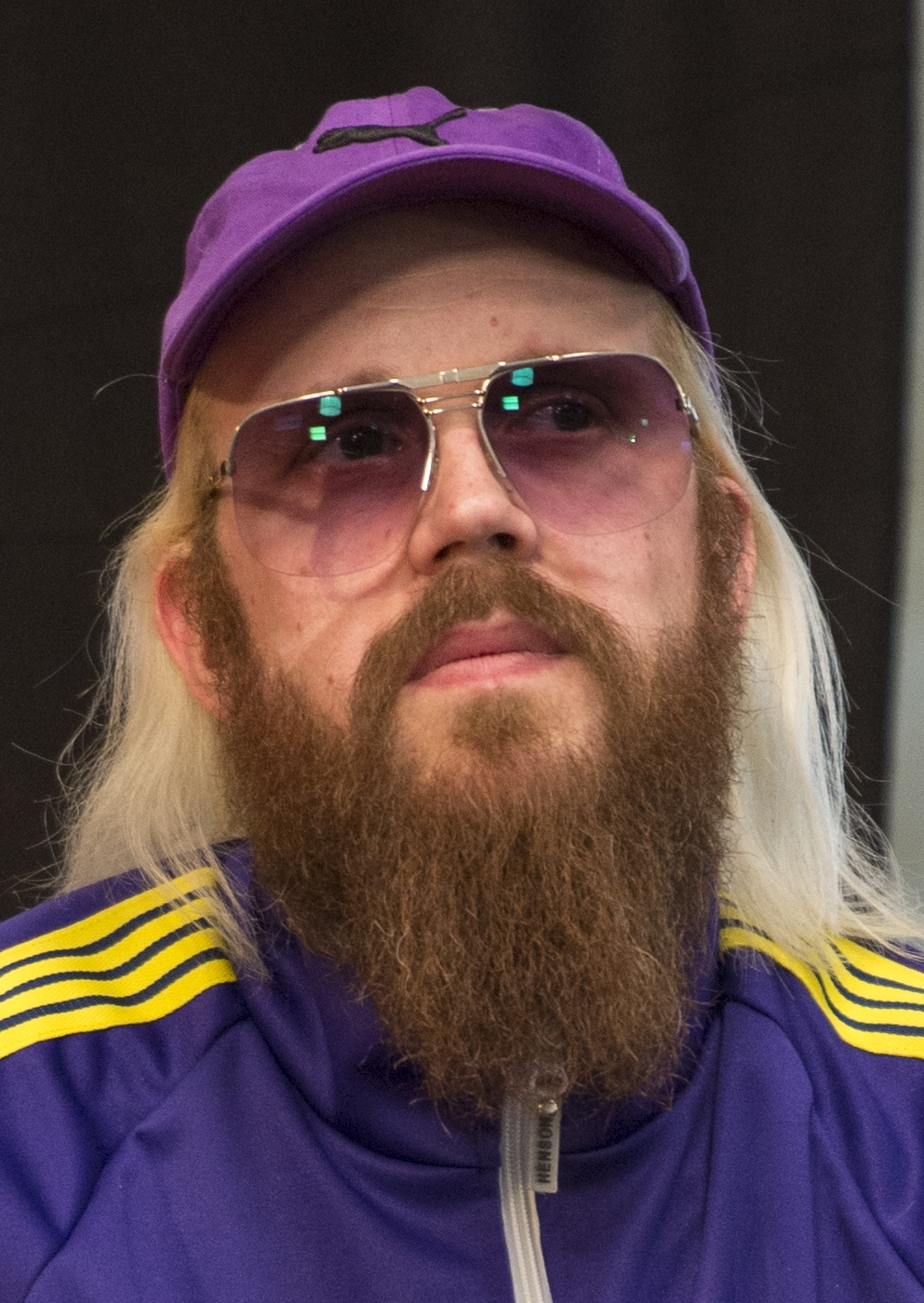

Minister of Health
- In office 11 January 2017 – 30 November 2017
- Prime Minister: Bjarni Benediktsson
- Preceded by: Kristján Þór Júlíusson
- Succeeded by: Svandís Svavarsdóttir

Leader of the Bright Future
- In office 31 January 2015 – 31 October 2017
- Preceded by: Guðmundur Steingrímsson
- Succeeded by: Björt Ólafsdóttir

Reykjavík City Councilor
- In office 15 June 2010 – 16 June 2014

Personal details
- Born: 7 November 1968 (age 57) Reykjavík, Iceland
- Party: Bright Future

Óttarr Olaf Proppé (born 7 November 1968) is a former Icelandic politician. He is a musician, actor, former Reykjavík City Councilor (Best Party 2010-2014) and former Member of Parliament (Bright Future 2013-2017). Óttarr was elected chairman of the party in 2015. He was a member of the rock band HAM in the years 1988–1994, as well as the lead singer of the rock-cabaret band Dr. Spock. He also starred in several movies, including Sódóma Reykjavík from 1992, and Nói Albinói and Angels of the Universe from 2000. He made a guest appearance with the band Pollapönk during the Eurovision Song Contest 2014 in Denmark, singing "No Prejudice" ending up 8th in the semi-final with 61 points, resulting in them progressing to the final, finishing in 15th with 58 points, which was Iceland's best result since 2009.
