= Three Summer Days =

1997 film

- Film poster
- Directed by: Mirjana Vukomanović
- Written by: Gordan Mihić
- Starring: Mirjana Joković
- Music by: Vlatko Stefanovski
- Release date: 7 August 1997
- Running time: 90 minutes
- Country: FR Yugoslavia
- Language: Serbian

Three Summer Days (Serbian: Tri letnja dana, Три летња дана) is a 1997 Serbian drama film directed by Mirjana Vukomanović. The film deals with everyday life of Bosnian Serb refugees living and working in Serbia. The film was selected as the Serbian entry for the Best Foreign Language Film at the 70th Academy Awards, but was not accepted as a nominee.

== Cast ==
- Mirjana Jokovic as Sonja
- Slavko Stimac as Sergije
- Srdjan Todorovic as Nikola
- Milena Dravic as Kaja
- Petar Kralj as Dimitrije
- Mirjana Karanovic as Gazdarica
- Petar Bozovic as Erke

== See also ==
- List of submissions to the 70th Academy Awards for Best Foreign Language Film
- List of Serbian submissions for the Academy Award for Best Foreign Language Film
