= Mirjana Vukomanović =

Serbian film, television and theater director

- Born: December 9, 1967 (age 57); Trstenik, PR Serbia, FPR Yugoslavia
- Occupation(s): Film director, Television director, Theatre director
- Years active: 1991–present
- Notable work: Three Summer Days (Tri letnja dana)

Mirjana Vukomanović (Serbian: Мирјана Вукомановић, pronounced [mirjana ʋukomanovitɕ], born December 9, 1967, in Trstenik) is a Serbian film, television and theater director who emerged in the 1990s as a significant figure in Serbian dramatic arts. She works in Serbia and the USA.

She has won several awards, including several Fipresci /International Film Critics Association/ awards, and awards from the Yugoslav Chapter of the International Film Critics Association. Her movie Three Summer Days (Tri letnja dana, 1997) was the Yugoslav submission to the 70th Academy Awards for Best Foreign Language Film.

She is a member of the Association of Cinema Artists of Serbia main board (Udruženje filmskih umetnika Srbije) since April 2013.

== Biography ==
As a child she has won nine major prizes for her children's films in Yugoslavia and received a UNESCO award for Poster and Embroidery.

She obtained a degree in multimedia directing from the University of Novi Sad Academy of Arts in 1991, under the tutelage of Vlatko Gilić. She has directed more than 30 documentaries, television series and films as well as several theatrical plays.

From 2000 to 2012 Vukomanović worked in New York City as a director and cinematographer for independent media agencies (Danny Schecter) and as independent documentary film maker. She owns a film production company "Danilo Film" in Belgrade.

She has been an acting professor in the National School of Ballet, Belgrade, and an instructor of directing at the New York Film Academy, New York.

Since 1991, Vukomanović has been a member of the Association of Cinema Artists (the national film guild) and currently is a member of its Main board. She is also a member of the Independent Feature Project (IFP), US, and a member of the Slavic Directors Association.

== Works ==
=== Filmography (partial) ===
Live action and documentary films

- Three Summer Days /Tri letnja dana/ (1997)
- Immortal Tap /Večita slavina/ (1994, TV Movie)
- Gratitude to Saint Lazar /Pohvala svetom knezu Lazaru/ (1992, TV Movie)
- Quiet Life /Tihovanje/
- About the Silence /O ćutanju/
- Sky on the Ground /Nebo na zemlji/
- Janos Altmajer /Janoš Altmajer/
- Fear of Flying Small Aircraft Objects /Strah od letilice/
- St. Sava /Sveti Sava/
- Mauthausen /Mauthauzen/
- Sky Over My Native Town /Nebo iznad moga grada/
- Jefimija's days /Jefimijini dani/

Television documentary series

- "Metropolis"
- "53 Cultural magazine for ordinary people" /Magazin 53 za obične ljude/
- "Rock and Roll forever" /Rokenrol zauvek/
- "Villages of Serbia" /Sela Srbije/
- "People Are Speaking" /Ljudi govore/
- "Serbian Medieval Monasteries" /Srpski srednjovekovni manastiri/

=== Theatrography ===
Play directing

- Steps by Samuel Beckett /Koraci/
- Lulu by Frank Wedekind /Uljuljkivanje/

Films of multi-media theater performances

- Death of Smail Aga Čengić /Smrt Smail-age Čengića/
- King Lear /Kralj Lir/
- Apocalypse /Apokalipsa/

== Awards and recognitions ==
Feature film "Three Summer Days" /Tri letnja dana/

- Yugoslav submission to the 70th Academy Awards for Best Foreign Language Film;
- Grand Prix of 11th Annual Yugoslav Film Festival,
- Best Film Fipresci Jury Award, Yugoslav Chapter of International Film Critics Association
- Grand Prix of The 10th Panorama of European Film, Athens, Greece, 1997
- Fipresci Award of The 7th Annual Festival of Young Eastern European Cinema, Cottbus, Germany, 1997,
- International Film Critics Association & Best Actress
- "Silver Knight" - Award of International Film Festival of Slavic Countries, Russia
- Grand Prix of several Yugoslavia/Serbia film festivals.

TV film "Immortal Tap" /Večita slavina/

- Emmy Award Nominee,
- Screenplay Festival, Vrnjacka Banja, Fipresci Jury Award, 1995

Documentary film "Quiet Life" /Tihovanje/

- Gold Medal 39th Festival of Yugoslav Documentary Film, Belgrade, Serbia
- Grand Prix International Ecological Festival, Zlatibor, Serbia, 1993,
- International Film Festival of Slavic Countries, Golden Knight, Russia, 1993.
- Grand Prix of Kuban International Film Festival, Russia, 2009.

== Literature ==
- María Palacios Cruz. "From Yugoslav to Serbian Cinema 1991-2001: Themes and Characteristics of a Cinema Industry in Transition", in: Balkan Identities, Balkan Cinemas, NISI MASA, European network of young cinema, Matthieu Darras, Maria Palacios Cruz (ed.), 2008, pp 64–72. ISBN 978-2-9531642-0-6
