= Marina Zurkow =

American artist

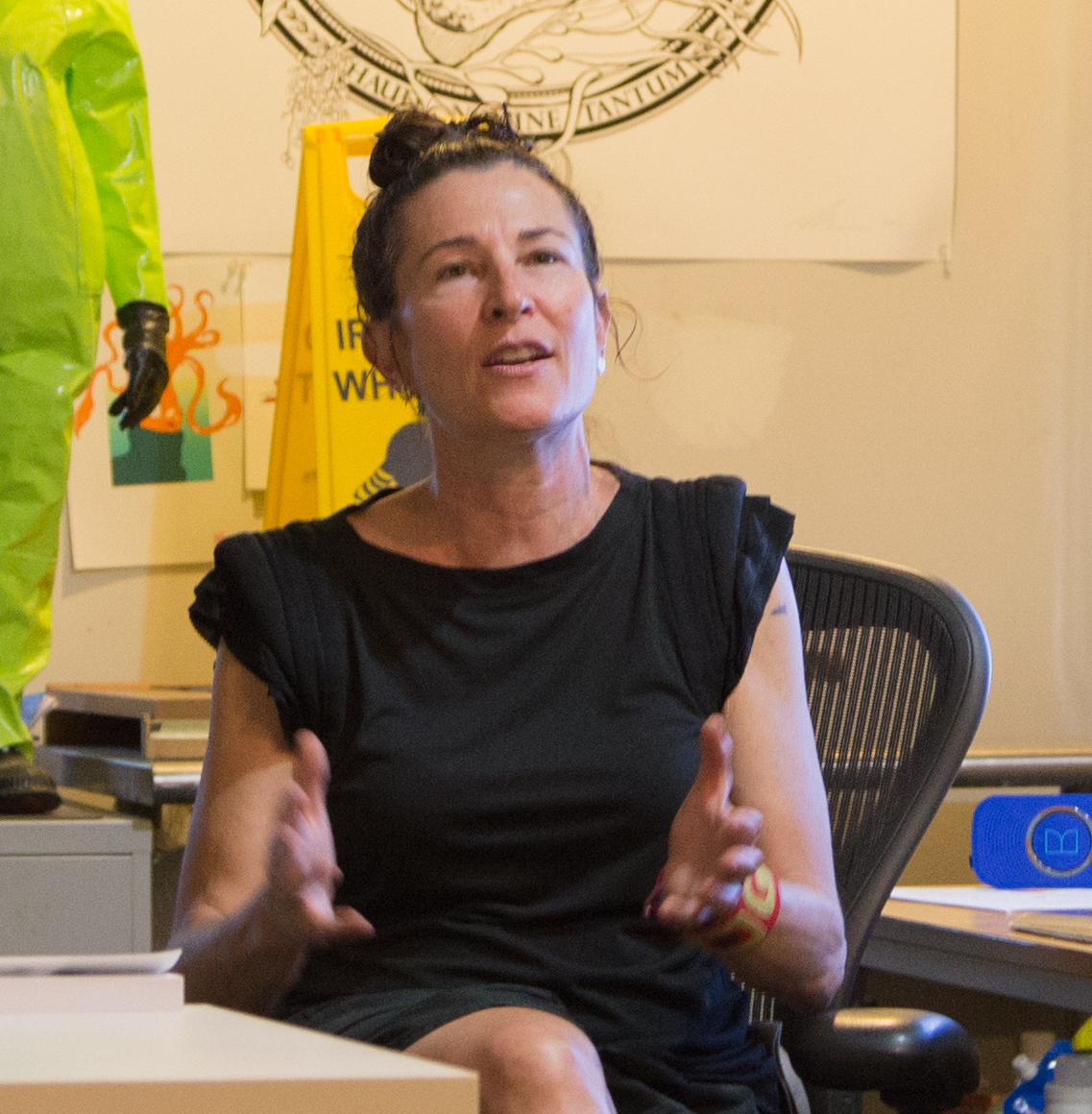
- Zurkow in 2016
- Born: Marina G. Zurkow; December 19, 1962 (age 63); New York
- Education: Bennington College MFA in Public Action, School of Visual Arts, Barnard College
- Years active: 1990-present
- Known for: Animation, New Media Art, Video Art
- Awards: Guggenheim Fellowship, Creative Capital, Rockefeller Foundation Emerging Arts Grant
- Website: o-matic.com

Marina G. Zurkow (born December 19, 1962) is an American visual artist based in New York City who works with media technology, animation, and video. Some of the less traditional mediums are known to be dinners, life science and bio materials. Her subject matter includes individual narratives, environmental concerns, and reflections on the relationship between species, or between humans, animals, plants and the weather. Her artworks have been seen in solo exhibitions at DiverseWorks in Houston Texas and at FACT in Liverpool. Zurkow is the recipient of a Creative Capital grant and has had fellowships from the Guggenheim and the Rockefeller Foundation.

== Career ==
Zurkow currently resides in the Hudson Valley, New York. Her experience as a faculty member at NYU Tisch's Interactive Telecommunications Program coupled with her degree in Fine Arts has equipped her with an understanding of fine arts media, installation, video art, and semiotics. Her wide usage of "web work" began in the mid 1990s, where her work with animation, gif animation and Flash v1.0 focused on what was possible on the internet, and differed from her previous work making experimental videos, films and graphic design projects. From 2003 on, she worked with rotoscoping (frame by frame on top of video), and well as a more standard cartooning of "squash and stretch, tweening of shapes, and purely invented behavioral cycles. She was an Eyebeam resident in 2009.

== Works ==
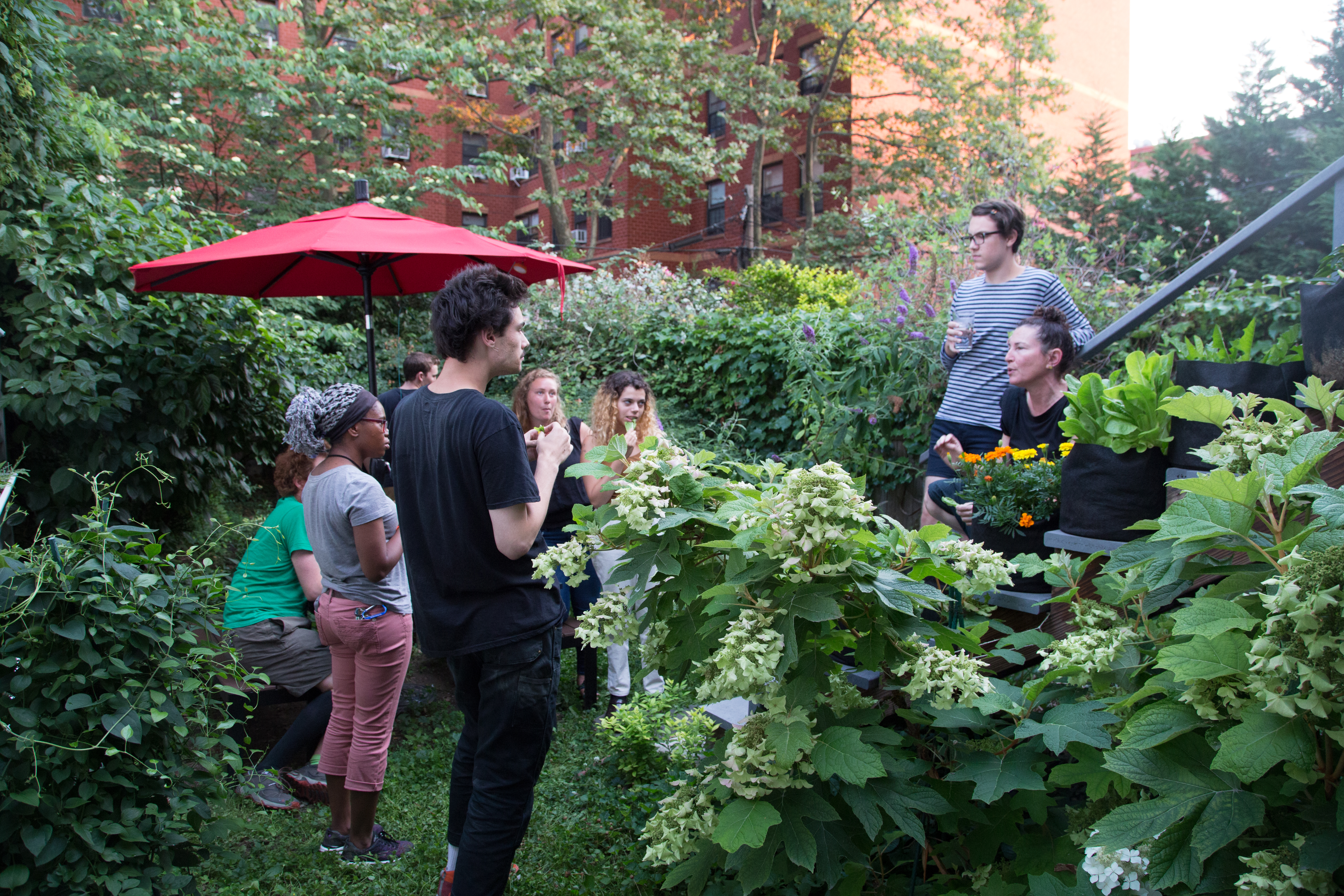
Marina Zurkow talks with National Young Adult Project (NYAP) participants in her Brooklyn Garden

Much of Zurkow's recent work is informed by both a sense of impending environmental catastrophe and a variety of art historical sources. This includes the series "Crossing the Waters" (2006–2009), a collection of digital animations inspired by the threat of climate change. The same concerns can be seen in the more recent series "Friends and Enemies" (2011-ongoing), which includes animations, prints (both digital and letterpress), and performances. One work in the "Friends and Enemies" series is Mesocosm (Northumberland, UK) (2011), a 146-hour, black-and-white looping animation set in the titular location.

Zurkow has also incorporated both food and performance into recent works. This includes "Outside the Work: A Tasting of Hydrocarbons and Geological Time" (2013), a performance/meal at Boston University's 808 Gallery and the Center for Energy and Environmental Research in the Human Sciences at Rice University, which used food as a means to prompt reflection on humanity's effect on the environment (particularly, in this case, relating to petroleum).

Additionally, Zurkow has also worked with several artists and other colleagues to collaborate on several projects. In 2006, she worked with Katie Salen and Nancy Nowacek, on the work, Karaoke Ice. Later on, in 2011, she also began work on a set of instructions for 2013, titled, Survival Challenges in collaboration with Ruth Ozeki, Oliver Kellhammer, Una Chaudhuri, Fritz Ertl, and a PTSD specialist.

Moreover, Zukow created a work, "Whale Fall Feast," based on the theme of having a buffet inside a whale sculpture. There were three sections that people could visit inside, each with a menu plate stuck onto the wall with untangled fish nets. It sarcastically announces how endangered species like whales are getting harmed since Zurkow notifies people that “Whales are not dying from natural causes. They are often dying from unnatural causes: ship strikers, net entanglements, overfishing, noise pollution and sonar.”
