= The Center for Energy and Environmental Research in the Human Sciences at Rice University =

The Center for Energy and Environmental Research in the Human Sciences (CENHS) is an interdisciplinary research center at Rice University that focuses on applying the arts, humanities, and social sciences on energy and environmental challenges.

== Background ==
CENHS supports a community of research professors, visiting research fellows, postdoctoral fellows, artists, and graduate students who engage issues such as energy use and climate change from the perspective of disciplines such as Anthropology, Architecture, Art History, Comparative Literature, English, History, Media Studies, Philosophy, Political Theory, Religious Studies, and Sociology.

CENHS’s website and blog and annual Cultures of Energy spring research symposium are important platforms for organizing knowledge and building community in a fast-growing field known as “energy humanities.”

What brought energy humanities into being is the realization that technology alone cannot rescue the planet from processes like global warming, ocean acidification and species extinction. These dilemmas have been shaped and reinforced by culture, belief, understanding, worldview, ethics, habit, and institutions. To address them at their source, it is thus essential to understand the social, cultural, and philosophical dimensions of how humanity uses energy while also understanding that human energy behavior is inseparable from other species and the Earth’s climate.

Energy humanities views itself as a cultural and intellectual response to recognition that the planet has entered a new geological era: the Anthropocene.

== History ==
CENHS grew out of the Cultures of Energy Initiative at Rice University (2011-2013)— funded by Rice’s Humanities Research Center and Provost’s Office and the Andrew Mellon Foundation. This initiative brought together faculty from the Departments of Anthropology, English, History, Philosophy, Religious Studies as well as the Jones Business School and the Department of Earth Sciences to discuss energy as a research topic

The intent of this discussion was to inspire new forms of interdisciplinary scholarship and the importance of bringing the arts, humanities and social sciences into contemporary cultural and political debates around energy transition, environmental conditions and energy futures.

CENHS was founded in 2013 as part of Rice’s Energy and Environment Initiative with anthropologist Dominic Boyer as its first director. CENHS administers Rice’s second major in Environmental Sciences and a new (as of 2015) minor degree program in Environmental Studies.

== Activities ==
CENHS supports four active faculty-led research clusters on Arts & Media, Catastrophes, Philosophy & Ethics, and Social Analytics.

CENHS has sponsored speakers include historians Dipesh Chakrabarty and Naomi Oreskes, literary scholars Timothy Morton and Karen Pinkus, sociologist Eric Klinenberg, film critic Tom Cohen, artists Judy Natal and Marina Zurkow, and political theorist Timothy Mitchell. Jón Gnarr, was CENHS’s first writer-in-residence during 2015.

CENHS helps to sponsor important projects in energy and environmental art including Matthew Schneider-Mayerson’s Fossilized in Houston, Judy Natal’s Another Storm is Coming and Marina Zurkow’s Outside the Work.

The CENHS Cultures of Energy symposium is currently the only annual energy humanities conference in the world and invites 12-15 speakers to Rice each Spring.

The CENHS blog features commentaries from CENHS fellows and other scholars in energy humanities, field reports about energy culture in Houston, conference calls, reviews, book announcements, and outstanding work by undergraduates. The blog also hosts a podcast series, featuring visiting scholars and writers. The CENHS website’s resources include an archive of energy humanities syllabi and a curated bibliography of writings on catastrophe.

== Environmental Studies minor ==
The Environmental Studies minor at Rice explores the connections between humans and the non-human world and the interactions of natural and social systems.

The minor is organized around core courses that explore the interrelationship between human cultures and their social and physical environments. Students then select courses from the Schools of Architecture, Humanities, Social Sciences, Engineering, and Natural Sciences to round out the minor. The curriculum is designed so that students emerge with the ability to analyze environmental issues from both scientific and social/cultural perspectives and with an appreciation for the cross-disciplinary nature of the complex relationship between humans and the world they inhabit.
