= Tvíhöfði =

Icelandic comedy duo

Tvíhöfði (English: Bicephalic) is an Icelandic comedy duo of Jón Gnarr and Sigurjón Kjartansson. They had a morning radio show on Aðalstöðin, X-ið & Radíó X for several years in the 1990s and early-2000s. They were also members of the Icelandic sketch comedy programme Fóstbræður in the late-1990s.
