= Réttur =

Icelandic television series

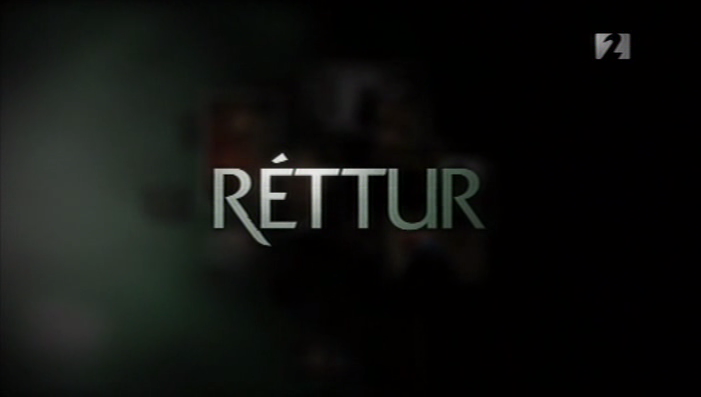
- Title card season 1
- Genre: Legal Drama, Thriller
- Created by: Sigurjón Kjartansson
- Developed by: Sigurjón Kjartansson
- Written by: Sigurjón Kjartansson,
- Story by: Sigurjón Kjartansson; Kristinn Þórðarson; Margrét Örnólfsdóttir; María Reyndal
- Directed by: Sigurjón Kjartansson, Baldvin Z (season 3)
- Starring: Magnús Jónsson; Jóhanna Vigdís Arnardóttir; Víkingur Kristjánsson; Steinunn Ólína Þorsteinsdóttir
- Composer: Barði Jóhannsson Pétur Jónsson (Season 3)
- Country of origin: Iceland
- Original language: Icelandic
- No. of seasons: 3
- No. of episodes: 21

Production
- Executive producer: Sigurjón Kjartansson
- Production locations: Reykjavík, Iceland
- Running time: 52 min
- Production company: Saga Film

Original release
- Network: Stöð 2
- Release: January 18, 2009 – December 13, 2015

Réttur (Icelandic: [ˈrjɛhtʏr̥], Right) is an Icelandic television series created and produced by Sigurjón Kjartansson of RVK Studios, retitled Case and The Court in English-language markets. It was picked up by NBC and producer Howard Gordon for a US remake. Seasons 1 and 2 feature a different case every episode, while season 3 is a single case that gets solved throughout the season.

== Plot ==
Réttur is about Logi Traustason, an attorney who joins a law firm owned by business partners Brynhildur and Hörður. Together they solve court cases which often brings them all too close to their cases and subjects of the Icelandic society.

== Characters ==
- Logi Traustason

Logi is an attorney of law. After spending years in prison for a murder he did not commit he opens his own law practice. His office gets bankrupted and he starts working his way up at another firm. After two years he does not get the partner position he is expecting, and leaves the firm to join Réttur, a small firm facing financial difficulties, owned by Brynhildur and Hörður. Logi is an alcoholic and quite the ladies man, finding it hard to stay true to only one woman. He and Brynhildur do not always see things eye to eye.
