= Tinna Hrafnsdóttir =

Icelandic actor, film director and screenwriter

- Born: 25 August 1975 (age 51)
- Occupations: actor; film director; screenwriter

Tinna Hrafnsdóttir (born 25 August 1975) is an Icelandic actor, film director and screenwriter.

== Filmography ==
Actor

- The Quiet Storm (2007)
- Double Existence (2011) – short
- Footsteps (2017) – short
- Margrete: Queen of the North (2021)

Television

- The Valhalla Murders (2019-2020)

Director

- Helga (2016) – short
- Munda (2017) – nominated for the Edda Awards for Short Film of the Year
- Quake (2021) – nominated for Best Film at the Santa Barbara International Film Festival
- Hildur (2026)
