= Ólafía Hrönn Jónsdóttir =

Icelandic actress (born 1962)

- Born: 7 December 1962 (age 63); Reykjavík, Iceland
- Occupations: Actress, voice actress
- Years active: 1989–present

Ólafía Hrönn Jónsdóttir (born 7 December 1962) is an Icelandic actress. She is known for her role as Freyja in Trapped.

== Early life ==
Ólafía was born in Reykjavík, Iceland in 1962. She grew up in Reykjavík, and in Hornafjörður where her father managed a bank. She was a scout when she was young and would play sketches for them whenever she got a chance. She graduated from Fjölbrautaskólinn í Ármúla in 1983 and went straight to Theater School (now a division under the Iceland Academy of the Arts)

== Career ==
Ólafía graduated from the Icelandic Theater School in 1987. She has acted in several stage productions for the National Theater of Iceland and other theaters. She received an Edda Award for her role in Brúðguminn.

== Personal life ==
In 2011 Ólafía worked with the Red Cross and professional chefs to produce a 12 episode cooking show showing cheap meal options for four-person families. All the meals cost under 2000 ISK (approx. 15 US Dollars).

== Filmography ==
- Áramótaskaup 1989 (1989) various roles
- SSL-25 (Short) (1990)
- Skýjahöllin (1994) as Inga
- Áramótaskaup 1996 (1996) various roles
- Perlur og Svín (1997) as Lísa
- Áramótaskaup 1997 (1997) various roles
- Áramótaskaup 2000 (2000) various roles
- Áramótaskaup 2001 (2001) various roles
- Litla lirfan ljóta (animated short) (2002) as the bee
- Stella í framboði (2002) as Ágústa kvennremba
- Stormviðri (2003) Guðrún
- Síðasti bærinn (Short) (2004) as the daughter
- Allir litir hafsins eru kaldir (TV-series) as Margrét
- Mýrin (2006) as Elínborg
- Brúðguminn (2008) as Sísí
- Skrapp út (2008)
- Dagvaktin (TV-series) (2008) as Gugga
- Forsthaus Falkenau (TV-series) (2009) as Bürgermeisterin
- Bjarnfreðarson (2009) as Guðbjörg Jónsdóttir
- Mamma Gógó (2010) as the director's sister
- Sumarlandið (2010) as Lára
- Fiskar á þurru landi (TV-movie) (2010) as Efemía
- Grafir & Bein (2016) as Hulda
- Ófærð (TV-series) (2015–2016) as Freyja, Hjörtur's mother
- Black Mirror (Episode: "Crocodile") (2017) as Felicity Carmichael
- True Detective (TV-series) (2024) as Stacy Chalmers
