= Róbert Ingi Douglas =

Icelandic film director, screenwriter and cinematographer

- Born: 4 June 1973 (age 52); Reykjavík, Iceland
- Occupations: film director; screenwriter; cinematographer

Róbert Ingi Douglas (born 4 June 1973, in Reykjavík) is an Icelandic film director, screenwriter and cinematographer who made his feature film debut with Íslenski draumurinn (2000). That film became a sleeper hit in the summer of 2000 becoming one of Iceland's biggest box-office hits that year. Róbert Douglas followed the success of his first film with a darker film about subtle racism in Iceland's society, A Man Like Me (2002). That film proved to be another commercial success in Iceland. Douglas then made Eleven Men Out (2005), a film about an all-gay soccer team. The film has already become a success outside of Iceland and is the director's first film to do so. Before making Eleven Men Out, Douglas made a documentary for television. This Is Sanlitun (2013), a comedy feature film set in Beijing is Douglas's latest film and premiered at the Toronto International Film Festival in 2013, it is Douglas's first English-language film.

Douglas is half Northern Irish and half Icelandic. His mother is from Iceland and his father is from Northern Ireland.

== Filmography ==
- The Icelandic Dream (Icelandic Íslenski draumurinn) (2000)
- A Man Like Me (Icelandic. Maður eins og ég) (2002)
- Small Mall (Icelandic. Mjóddin slá í gegn) (2004)
- Eleven Men Out (Icelandic. Strákarnir okkar) (2005)
- This Is Sanlitun (2013)
