= Eleven Men Out =

2005 Icelandic film by Róbert Ingi Douglas

- Poster
- Icelandic: Strákarnir okkar
- Directed by: Róbert Ingi Douglas
- Written by: Róbert Ingi Douglas; Jón Atli Jónasson
- Produced by: Ingvar Þórðarson; Sam Taylor; Mike Downey; Júlíus Kemp; Zorana Piggott
- Starring: Björn Hlynur Haraldsson; Lilja Nótt Þórarinsdóttir; Arnmundur Ernst
- Cinematography: Magni Ágústsson
- Edited by: Ásta Briem; Róbert Ingi Douglas
- Music by: Barði Jóhannsson; Mínus
- Distributed by: Regent Releasing; Icelandic Filmcompany; Film and Music Entertainment
- Release date: 2 September 2005 (Iceland)
- Running time: 85 minutes
- Country: Iceland/Finland/United Kingdom
- Language: Icelandic
- Budget: €1,500,000 (estimate)

Eleven Men Out (Icelandic: Strákarnir okkar) is a comedy drama film directed by Róbert Ingi Douglas. The film participated in the Toronto International Film Festival (2005), the Berlin International Film Festival (2006), and the Hawaii International Film Festival.

== Plot summary ==
Ottar Thor is the star player of the Icelandic football team KR. He is a well-liked player who causes a stir when he admits being gay to his teammates and then goes on a journey to discover himself (with the help of the local press). He soon finds himself on the bench for most of his team's matches and decides to call it quits with KR. He joins a small amateur team mainly made up of men like himself – gay guys trying to play soccer in a straight world.

The director of KR, who happens to be Ottar Thor's father, tries everything in his power to persuade Ottar to come back and play for his team, but he needs to get himself back into the closet before playing pro football again. A struggle between father and son starts. Ottar Thor also has a son, a teenager who is not coping well with all the attention his father is getting for the wrong reasons.

Ottar Thor finally gives in to his father and returns to KR on the condition that KR plays one match against the gay team. His father accepts this condition, not realising that the match will take place on Gay Pride Day. KR wins the match 8–0.

== Main cast ==
- Björn Hlynur Haraldsson as Ottar Thor
- Lilja Nótt Þórarinsdóttir as Gugga
- Arnmundur Ernst as Magnus
- Helgi Björnsson as Pétur
- Þorsteinn Bachmann as Georg
- Sigurður Skúlason as Eiríkur
- Lilja Guðrún Þorvaldsdóttir as Ragnheiður
- Jón Atli Jónasson as Orri
- Björk Jakobsdóttir as Lára
- Damon Younger as Brósi
- Erlendur Eiríksson as Alfreð
- Valdimar Örn Flygenring as Valdi
- Marius Sverrisson as Starri
- Viðir Guðmundsson as Daníel
- Magnús Jónsson as Aron
- Davíð Guðbrandsson as Ingvar
- Jóhann G. Jóhannsson as Matthias
- Árni Pétur Guðjónsson as Logi
- Jón Ingi Hákonarson as Straight Leikmadur
- Serouna Yansane as Percy
- Jón Jósep Snæbjörnsson as Stebbi1
- Ísgerður Elfa Gunnarsdóttir as Sigurbjörg
- Hilmár Jónsson as Viktor
- Stefán Jónsson as Ási Sálfræðingur
- Pétur Einarsson as Björgvin
- Elli Johannesson as Gunnar
- Gudmundur Thorvaldsson as Markmadur (as Guðmundur Ingi Þorvaldsson)
- Ívar Örn Sverrisson as Liðsmaður KR1
- Felix Bergsson as Dómari
- Ingibjörg Reynisdóttir as Blaðakona
- Björn Ingi Hilmarsson as Logregulumadur
- Thelma Bjork Jonsdottir as Logreglukona
- Bergur Þór Ingólfsson as Lidsmadur SAA1,
- Arnar Björnsson as Actor
- Róbert I. Douglas as Hommahatari I Utvarpi
- Gunnþór Sigurðsson as Actor
- Erling Jóhannesson as Actor
- Nanna Ósk Jónsdóttir as Samsidanith (Sigga)
- Pattra Sriyanonge as Rosa - Goth Girl
- Ingvar Þórðarson as Homma hatari
- Þorsteinn Bachmann as Georg (uncredited)

== Reception ==
The film has been compared to the 2004 German production Guys and Balls.

== Release ==
Eleven Men Out was released on 31 August 2005.

== Awards ==
'Edda Awards' - Iceland

- Nominated for an Edda Award for Best Film
- Nominated for an Edda Award for Supporting Actor or Supporting Actress of the Year - Þorsteinn Bachmann
- Nominated for an Edda Award for Supporting Actor or Supporting Actress of the Year - Helgi Björnsson
- Nominated for an Edda Award for Supporting Actor or Supporting Actress of the Year - Jón Atli Jónason
