= Satu Rämö =

Finnish-Icelandic author and entrepreneur

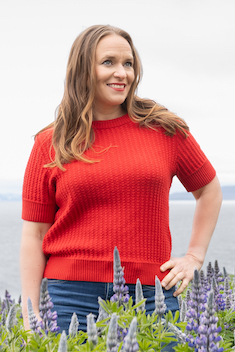
- Satu Rämö in 2024
- Born: 7 January 1980 (age 46); Forssa, Finland
- Occupations: Author; entrepreneur in communications
- Children: 2
- Writing career
- Genre: Nordic blue
- Website: satu.is

Satu Rämö (born 7 January 1980) is a Finnish-Icelandic author and an entrepreneur in communications.

== Education ==
Rämö holds a Master of Science in Economics (kauppatieteiden maisteri) and a Bachelor of Arts (humanististen tieteiden kandidaatti).

== Books ==
Finnish author Satu Rämö’s fiction debut and the first novel in the internationally bestselling Hildur series, The Clues in the Fjord, was an instant success, following its publication in Finland 2022. The award-winning series has sold 2 million copies across 29 territories. A Finnish-Icelandic TV adaptation based on the series premiered in early 2026. Three theatre adaptation based in the Hildur series have premiered in 2024 in Turku City Theatre, in 2026 Helsinki City Theatre and in 2026 in Tampere Comedy Theatre. A television adaptation was streamed from 26 January 2026 under the same name.

== Awards ==
- Shortlisted for the Petrona Award 1 (Scandinavian Crime Novel of the Year) UK – Hildur The Grave in the Ice 2026
- Storytel Award 2 (Best Crime Novel of the Year) Iceland – Hildur The Grave in the Ice 2026
- Adlibris Awards 3 (Best Lifestyle Book of the Year) Finland – Hildur-villapaidat Hildur - Wool Sweaters 2026
- Adlibris Awards 3 (Best Crime Novel of the Year) Finland – Tinna The Stranger from the Mountains 2026
- Prix Point Par Points 4 (Best Crime Novel of the Year) France – Hildur The Clues in the Fjord 2026
- Nominated for the Dublin Literary Award Ireland 5 – Hildur The Clues in the Fjord 2026
- Shortlisted for CWA Dagger 6 (Best Translated Crime Fiction) UK – Hildur The Clues in the Fjord 2025
- The Petrona Award 1 (Best Scandinavian Crime Novel of the Year) UK – Hildur The Clues in the Fjord 2025
- Adlibris Awards 8 (Best Crime Novel of the Year) Finland – Rakel The Secrets from the Deep 2024
- Storytel Award 9 (Best Crime Novel of the Year) Finland – Rósa&Björk The Grave in the Ice 2024
- BookBeat Award 9 (Best Crime Novel of the Year) Finland – Jakob The Shadow of the Northern Lights 2024
- Adlibris Awards 10 (Best Crime Novel of the Year) Finland – Rósa&Björk The Grave in the Ice 2023
- Nextory E-Book Awards 11 (Best Fiction of the Year) Finland – Hildur The Clues in the Fjord 2023
- Shortlisted for the Thrill Zone Awards 12 (Best Translated Crime Fiction Debut) The Netherlands – Hildur The Clues in the Fjord 2023
- Shortlisted for the Johtolanka Prize Finland 13 – Rósa&Björk The Grave in the Ice 2023
- Bookbeat Awards 14 (Newcomer of the Year) Finland – Hildur The Clues in the Fjord 2022
- Shortlisted for Tulenkantaja - the Finnish Literary Export Prize Finland 15 – Hildur The Clues in the Fjord 2022
- Supla Audio Awards (Audio Book of the Year ) 12 Finland – Hildur The Clues in the Fjord 2022

== Personal life ==
Born in Forssa, Finland, Rämö lives with her Icelandic spouse Björgvin Hilmarsson and their two children in Ísafjörður, Iceland.

== Works ==
Rämö's published works include:

- Mondo Islanti, Image Kustannus & A-Kustannus (2008, 2013) ISBN 978-952-5678-48-2
- Vuoden mutsi, Otava (2012) (with Katja Lahti) ISBN 978-951-1-28274-7
- Vuoden mutsi 2, Otava (2014) (with Katja Lahti) ISBN 978-951-1-27829-0
- Islantilainen voittaa aina, WSOY (2015) ISBN 978-951-0-40965-7
- My Journey to Iceland, Odinseye Publishing (2016)
- Unelmahommissa, WSOY (2017) (with Hanne Valtari) ISBN 978-951-0-41935-9
- Tripsteri Islanti, Readme (2017) ISBN 978-952-321-511-5
- Islantilainen kodinonni, WSOY (2018) ISBN 978-951-0-43063-7
- Viesti perille!, Edita Publishing (2019) (E-book) ISBN 978-951-37-7488-2
- Kynä - Kaikki tärkeä kirjoittamisesta, Tuuma-kustannus (2020) (With Mirjami Haimelin) ISBN 978-952-370-010-9.
- Kynä - Tehtäviä oman äänen löytämiseen, Tuuma-kustannus (2020) (with Mirjami Haimelin) ISBN 978-952-370-011-6.
- Unelmaduunarin tilipäivä, WSOY (2020) (with Hanne Valtari) ISBN 978-951-0-44710-9.
- Talo maailman reunalla, WSOY (2021) ISBN 978-951-0-46251-5
- Siggan ja Satun islantilaiset villapaidat, WSOY (2022) (with Sigríður Sif “Sigga” Gylfadóttir) ISBN 978-951-0-48794-5.
- Lottalehto, Tammi (2024) (With Satu Kontinen) ISBN 978-952-04-5838-6
- Kotikumpu, Tammi (2025) (With Satu Kontinen) ISBN 978-952-04-5850-8
- Tiiraluoto, Tammi, (2025) (With Satu Kontinen) ISBN 978-952-04-5853-9
- Trollilaakso, Tammi, (2026) (With Satu Kontinen) ISBN 978-952-04-8128-5
- Hildur villapaidat, WSOY (2025) (with Sigríður Sif “Sigga” Gylfadóttir) ISBN 978-951-0-51593-8

The Hildur detective series:

- Hildur, Helsinki: WSOY (2022) ISBN 978-951-0-47920-9.
  (English translation by Kristian London: The Clues in the Fjord ISBN 978-1-804-18840-8, Zaffre 2024)
- Rósa & Björk, Helsinki: WSOY (2023) ISBN 978-951-0-48127-1.
  (English translation by Kristian London: The Grave in the Ice ISBN 978-1-804-18847-7, Zaffre 2025)
- Jakob, Helsinki: WSOY (2023) ISBN 978-951-0-48124-0.
  (English translation by Kristian London: The Shadow of the Northern Lights ISBN 978-1-804-18843-9, Zaffre 2025)
- Rakel, Helsinki: WSOY (2024) ISBN 978-951-0-50733-9.
  (English translation by Kristian London: The Secrets from the Deep ISBN 978-1-806-17274-0, Zaffre 2026)
- Tinna, Helsinki: WSOY (2025) ISBN 978-951-0-50852-7.
  (English translation by Kristian London: The Stranger from the Mountains ISBN 978-1-806-17276-4, Zaffre 2026)
