= Pétur Jóhann Sigfússon =

Icelandic actor and comedian (born 1972)

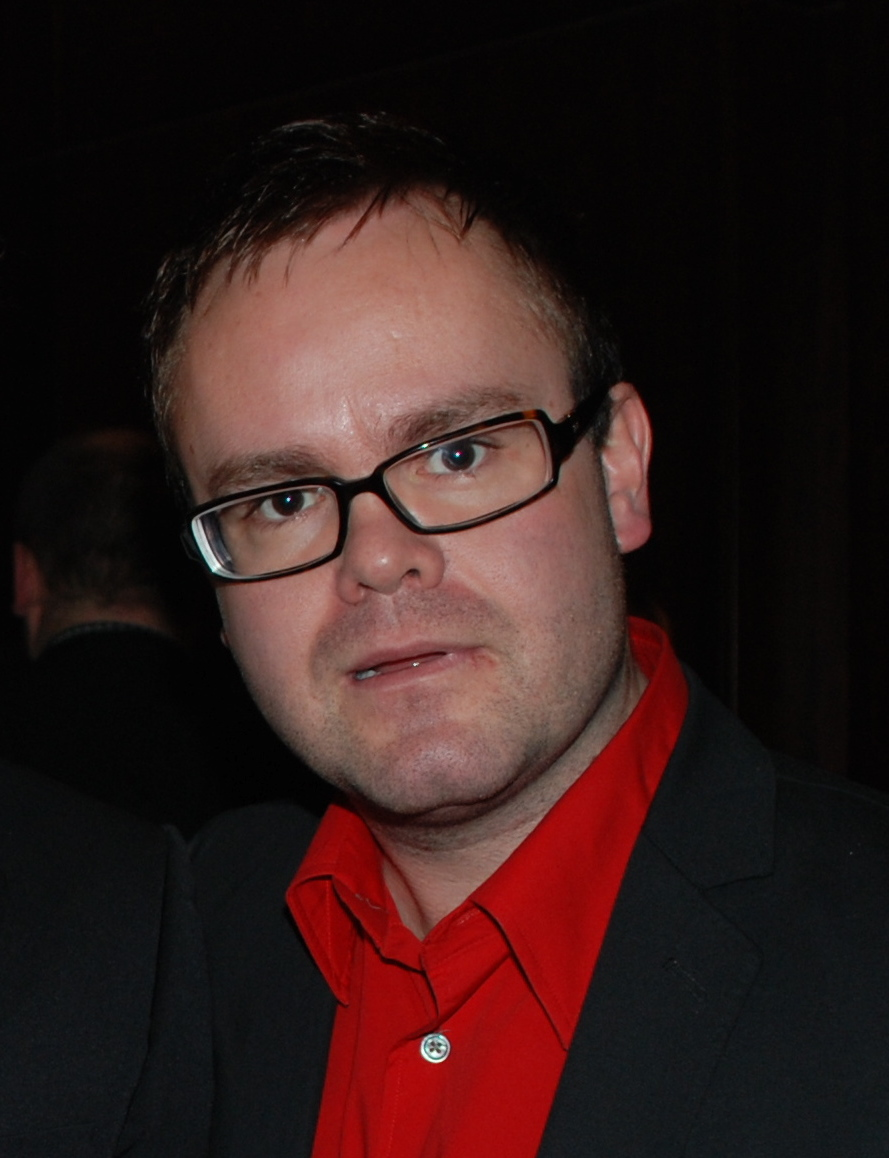
- Pétur Jóhann in 2007.
- Born: 21 April 1972 (age 52); Sauðárkrókur, Iceland
- Occupations: Actor; comedian; radio host; screenwriter
- Years active: 1999–present

Pétur Jóhann Sigfússon (born 21 April 1972) is an Icelandic actor, comedian, radio host and screenwriter. He was named the Funniest Man in Iceland in 1999. He is known for his portrayal of Ólafur Ragnar in the television series Næturvaktin and its sequels, Dagvaktin and Fangavaktin.

== Early life ==
Pétur was born in Sauðárkrókur but moved at a young age to Reykjavík.
