= Jörundur Ragnarsson =

Icelandic actor (born 1979)

- Born: 9 July 1979 (age 47); Hvammstangi, Iceland
- Education: Iceland University of the Arts
- Occupation: Actor
- Years active: 2006–present

Jörundur Ragnarsson (born 9 July 1979) is an Icelandic actor. He is best known for his role as Daníel Sævarsson in Næturvaktin and its sequels, Dagvaktin and Fangavaktin.

In 2007, he appeared in Veðramót, for which he won an award for best supporting actor at the 2007 Edda Awards. In 2021, he played the role of Zack Mossbergsson, a parody of Facebook CEO Mark Zuckerberg, in a commercial by Íslandstofa (English: Business Iceland), a public-private organization responsible for the branding and marketing of Iceland and Icelandic export industries.

== Early life ==
Jörundur was born in Hvammstangi, Iceland. At the age of 7, his family moved to Suðureyri, in the Westfjords, where his father became mayor. The family later moved to Súðavík and Ólafsvík before he settled in Reykjavík.
