= Icelandic Film School =

Film school in Reykjavik, Iceland

The Icelandic Film School
- Logo
- Other name: Kvikmyndaskóli Íslands
- Established: 1992
- Location: Reykjavík, Iceland
- Website: www.icelandicfilmschool.is

The Icelandic Film School (Icelandic: Kvikmyndaskóli Íslands) is an Icelandic institute offering two-year Diplomas in Directing & Producing, Creative Technology, Screenwriting & Directing, and Acting. The school was formed in 1992 by Böðvar Bjarki Pétursson. In 2002, the school moved to the former premises of Sjónvarpið on Laugavegur and its first students graduated in 2005.
