= Best Party =

Political party in Iceland

Best Party Besti flokkurinn
- Chairperson: Jón Gnarr
- Vice-chairperson: Heiða Kristín Helgadóttir
- Founder: Jón Gnarr
- Founded: 16 November 2009
- Dissolved: 16 June 2014
- Headquarters: Laugavegur 40a, Reykjavík
- National affiliation: Bright Future (2014)
- International affiliation: Pirate Parties International (observer)
- Colours: Blue / Pink

The Best Party (Icelandic: Besti flokkurinn) was an Icelandic political party founded by Jón Gnarr on 16 November 2009. The party contested the 2010 city council election in Reykjavík and won a plurality on the Reykjavík City Council, receiving 34.7% of the vote, defeating the Independence Party which received 33.6%. It was an observer member of the International Pirate Party, but not associated with the Pirate Party Iceland. Jón Gnarr announced that the party was to be dissolved after he stepped down as mayor after the upcoming local elections in May 2014. Many of the Best Party's members joined Bright Future, while Jón himself stopped political participation.

The founder and chairman of the party was the former Mayor of Reykjavík Jón Gnarr. The party was founded several months after the Icelandic parliamentary election in 2009, and was closely related to the national Bright Future party, led by MP and Best Party Vice President Heiða Kristín Helgadóttir.

The party's initial success is seen as a backlash against establishment parties in the wake of Iceland's 2008–2011 financial crisis.

== History ==
The Best Party was founded in late 2009 by Jón Gnarr, an Icelandic actor, comedian and writer. Originally a joke party, it stated from the beginning that it would not honour any of its election promises. It claimed all other parties were secretly corrupt, and promised to be openly corrupt. Among its original goals was to satirize common themes in Icelandic politics, partly by mimicking the standard phrases, idioms and jargon used by Icelandic politicians.

After its electoral success in Reykjavík in 2010, the Best Party became more serious. It began to show a genuine interest in governing, and took a left-wing stance on many issues. Jón Gnarr identifies as an anarchist, but the party as a whole was closer to the centre-left.

Since its founding, the Best Party developed into a full-grown political party with its own independent agenda. The theme song of the Best Party was The Best, by Tina Turner. Prior to the 2010 election, the party published a new version of the song with new, Iceland-specific lyrics. A music video was also made, featuring Ágústa Eva Erlendsdóttir.

In late 2012 the party founded Bright Future, with independent MP Guðmundur Steingrímsson, in order to contest the 2013 national parliamentary election. Jón Gnarr, by then Mayor of Reykjavík, and Óttarr Proppé, a Reykjavík City Councilman, were candidates for the new party in that election. The Best Party's Managing Director Heiða Kristín Helgadóttir is also the chairwoman of Bright Future.

== Party platform ==
1. To help the households in the country: Family is the best thing in society. Governments need to meet the needs and demands of households. An ironclad shield wall needs to be raised around the households in this country. Icelandic households deserve only the best.
2. To improve the quality of life of the Less Fortunate: We want the best of everything for this bunch and therefore offer free access to buses and swimming pools so you can travel around Reykjavik and be clean even if you're poor or there's something wrong with you.
3. Stop corruption: We promise to stop corruption. We'll accomplish this by participating in it openly.
4. Equality: Everyone deserves the best regardless of who they are and where they come from. We will do our best for everyone so that everyone can be together on the best team.
5. Increase transparency: It is best to have everything aboveboard so that the general public knows what is going on. We say we support that.
6. Effective democracy: Democracy is pretty good, but an effective democracy is best. That's why we want it.
7. Cancel all debts: We listen to the nation and do as it wishes because the nation knows what's best for itself.
8. Free bus rides for students and disabled people: We can offer more free things than any other party because we aren't going to follow through with it. We could say whatever we want. For example, free flights for women or free cars for people who live in rural areas. It's all the same.
9. Free dental services for children and handicapped people: This is something that is lacking, and we definitely want to take part in promising it.
10. Free access to swimming pools for everyone and free towels: This is something that everyone should fall for, and it's the election promise we're most proud of.
11. Take those responsible for the economic collapse to court: Felt we had to include this.
12. Complete equality of the sexes
13. Listen more to women and old people: This bunch gets listened to far too little. It's as if everyone thinks they are just complaining or something. We're going to change that.

== Election 2010 ==
The party's first endeavor in politics was to present a list of candidates for the local election in Reykjavík in 2010. Its platform included free towels in all city swimming pools, a polar bear for the city zoo, a Disneyland at Vatnsmýri park, and a drug-free national parliament (Althing) by 2020. The party won six of the 15 seats on the Reykjavík City Council, and governed the city alongside the Social Democratic Alliance as the senior coalition partner.

== See also ==
- List of frivolous political parties
