= The Icelandic Dream =

2000 film by Róbert Ingi Douglas

- Directed by: Róbert Ingi Douglas
- Written by: Róbert Ingi Douglas
- Produced by: Jón F. Thoroddsen; Júlíus Kemp
- Starring: Þórhallur Sverrisson
- Cinematography: Júlíus Kemp
- Edited by: Róbert Ingi Douglas
- Music by: Jóhann Jóhannsson
- Distributed by: Samfilm
- Release date: October 19, 2001 (USA)
- Running time: 90 min.
- Country: Iceland
- Languages: Icelandic; English; Thai

The Icelandic Dream (Icelandic: Íslenski draumurinn) is a 2000 Icelandic film directed by Róbert Ingi Douglas. The movie depicts the story about an average Icelander and his dream to maintain wealth and fame.

== Plot ==
Þórhallur Sverrisson stars as "Tóti", a 29-year-old grade school graduate who tries to earn his living by importing Bulgarian cigarettes to Iceland. His 18-year-old girlfriend "Dagmar", played by Hafdís Huld, is trying to put up with him and his hobbies and soccer, while in high school (Menntaskóli). His best friend "Valli", a house painter and a longtime friend of Tóti speaks his mind throughout the movie, such as his thoughts on women and his patriotic ideas on Iceland, he is played by Jón Gnarr. Tóti is deep in debt when sales of the cigarettes take off, but success is brief, and he goes to prison. His ex takes their daughter away with her new boyfriend to the USA. His teenage girlfriend ends up with a star soccer player to rub salt in the wounds. Tóti is released from prison and his ex and daughter return from the USA.

== Cast ==
- Þórhallur Sverrisson
- Jón Gnarr
- Matt Keeslar
- Hafdís Huld
- Laufey Brá Jónsdottir
- Þorsteinn Bachmann

== Reception ==
The movie was filmed in Reykjavík, Iceland. It was one of the three biggest box office movies in Iceland in the year 2000. The dialogue of the film was improvised. Þórhallur Sverrisson and Jón Gnarr performance in the film set new standard in Icelandic film and television acting. The director, Róbert Ingi Douglas, created a movie that was considerably admired for its portrayal of joy, sadness and laughter in a film about the common Icelandic man and his life.
