= Dagvaktin =

- Genre: Situation comedy
- Written by: Jóhann Ævar Grímsson; Jón Gnarr; Jörundur Ragnarsson; Pétur Jóhann Sigfússon; Ragnar Bragason
- Directed by: Ragnar Bragason
- Starring: Jón Gnarr; Jörundur Ragnarsson; Pétur Jóhann Sigfússon; Ólafía Hrönn Jónsdóttir
- Country of origin: Iceland
- Original language: Icelandic
- No. of seasons: 1
- No. of episodes: 11

Production
- Editor: Sverrir Kristjánsson
- Running time: 25 min.
- Production company: Sagafilm

Original release
- Network: Stöð 2

Dagvaktin (English: The Day Shift) is a sequel to the Icelandic television series Næturvaktin. It is the second of the three series in the trilogy. The three main characters from Næturvaktin, Georg Bjarnfreðarson (Jón Gnarr), Ólafur Ragnar (Pétur Jóhann Sigfússon) and Daníel (Jörundur Ragnarsson), all return to work at a hotel in the sparsely populated Westfjords (near Reykhólar).

It was first broadcast on Stöð 2 on 21 September 2008, and was subsequently released on DVD.

== Characters ==
- Jón Gnarr as Georg Bjarnfreðarson, now working at Hótel Bjarkarlundur
- Pétur Jóhann Sigfússon as Ólafur Ragnar Hannesson, now working at Hótel Bjarkarlundur
- Jörundur Ragnarsson as Daníel Sævarsson, now working as cook at Hótel Bjarkarlundur
- Ólafía Hrönn Jónsdóttir as Gugga, Hotel manager at Hótel Bjarkarlundur who has crush on Georg
- Flemming Geir Georgsson, Georg's son
- Ævar Þór Benediktsson as Óðinn Víglundsson, 20 year old boy who live close to the hótel and befriends Georg
- Magnús Ólafsson as Víglundur, local farmer and Óðinn's father
- Árni Pétur Guðjónsson as Eberneser, local police chief

=== Guest stars ===
- Björk as Sérstakur gestur
