= Jón Gnarr =

Icelandic actor and politician

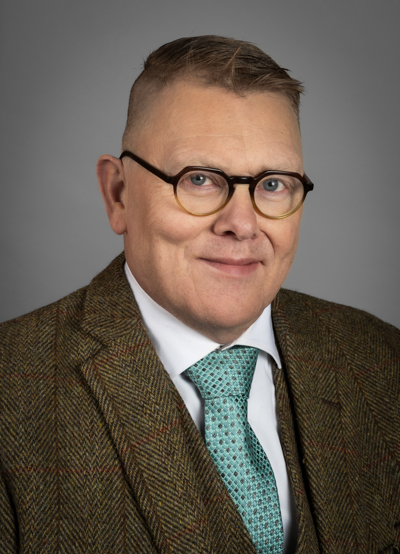
- Official portrait, 2025

Member of the Althing
- Incumbent
- Assumed office 1 December 2024
- Constituency: Reykjavík South

20th Mayor of Reykjavík
- In office 15 June 2010 – 16 June 2014
- Preceded by: Hanna Birna Kristjánsdóttir
- Succeeded by: Dagur B. Eggertsson

Personal details
- Born: Jón Gunnar Kristinsson; 2 January 1967 (age 59) Reykjavík, Iceland
- Party: Viðreisn (since 2024)
- Other political affiliations: Best Party (2009–2014); Bright Future (2012–2015); Independent (2015–2017); Social Democratic Alliance (2017–2024)
- Spouse: Jóhanna "Jóga" Jóhannsdóttir
- Children: 5

Jón Gnarr (Icelandic: [ˈjouːn ˈknar̥ː]; born Jón Gunnar Kristinsson (Note: According to Icelandic naming customs, Jón would still be referred to by his given name; however, he also decided to remove the patronymic Kristinsson from his name, which he was legally allowed in 2015 by the Icelandic Naming Committee. Jón legally changed his middle name Gunnar in 2005 to the way his mother pronounced it when he was a boy. Gnarr was only recognized as a surname by the courts in 2018.) on 2 January 1967) is an Icelandic actor, comedian, and politician who served as the Mayor of Reykjavík from 2010 to 2014. He is currently a member of the Althing for Viðreisn, elected in the 2024 Icelandic parliamentary election.

Jón was a well-known comedian and actor starting in the 1990s, including teaming with Sigurjón Kjartansson as the duo Tvíhöfði on radio and television. In 2009, he formed the Best Party, a political party that began as political satire but quickly turned into a real political player due to its electoral successes, which were perceived to be a reaction to the 2008–2011 Icelandic financial crisis.

== Early years ==
Jón was misdiagnosed with severe intellectual disability as a child and was treated between the ages of five and seven at the children's psychiatry ward at the State Hospital at Dalbraut, Reykjavík. He has dyslexia and had learning difficulties. Jón Gnarr recounts these experiences in his book The Indian, an autobiographical account of his childhood.

Jón was known as Jónsi Punk as a teenager and played bass in a punk band called Nefrennsli ("Runny Nose"). While attending a number of high schools, he didn't complete the university entrance exam, Stúdentspróf. As a young man, he held jobs with car maker Volvo and drove a taxi in Reykjavík. During the 1980s, he and his future wife, Jóhanna "Jóga" Jóhannsdóttir, became acquainted with the members of the Reykjavík-based alternative rock band the Sugarcubes, including Björk Guðmundsdóttir and Einar Örn Benediktsson. Björk remained a close friend to Jóhanna, writing the song "Jóga" from her 1997 album Homogenic about her.

== Education ==
Jón has an MFA degree in performing arts from the Iceland University of the Arts. His graduation work was his own performance of the ancient Icelandic poem Völuspá from the Poetic Edda

== Performance career ==
In 1994, Jón teamed up with Sigurjón Kjartansson to form the radio duo Tvíhöfði. In 1997, he joined TV station Stöð 2 where he wrote and starred in several seasons of the Icelandic comedy show Fóstbræður. His best known movies are The Icelandic Dream and A Man like Me. His stand-up comedy show Ég var einu sinni nörd (I Used To Be a Nerd) is autobiographical. In 2004 he wrote, starred and produced a short film, The Man on the Back.

He worked as a creative writer and actor at the Icelandic advertising agency EnnEmm, producing several popular TV ads. He played Georg Bjarnfreðarson on the television series Næturvaktin (Night Shift), Dagvaktin (Day Shift) and Fangavaktin (Prison Shift). He was also a co-writer in the series, which introduced a number of new actors. In 2009, he starred in the feature film Bjarnfreðarson, which endeared him even further to the Icelandic public. Jón is a member of Félag íslenskra leikara (Icelandic Actors Guild) and Félag leikskálda og handritshöfunda (Playwrights and Screenwriters Guild).

== Political career ==
In late 2009, Jón founded the Best Party with a number of other people who had no background in politics, including Einar. The Best Party, which is a satirical political party that parodies Icelandic politics and aims to make the life of the citizens more fun, managed a plurality in the 2010 municipal elections in Reykjavík, with the party gaining six out of 15 seats on the Reykjavík City Council (34.7 percent of the vote). Einar, who was second on the party's list behind Jón, won one of the seats on the city council.

Jón ended up defeating the centre-right Independence Party-led municipal government of Hanna Birna Kristjánsdóttir, which came as "a shock" to Icelandic Prime Minister Jóhanna Sigurðardóttir. Jón's victory is widely seen as a backlash against establishment politicians in the wake of the Icelandic financial crisis, i.e. 2008 banking collapse.

His political platform included promises of "free towels in all swimming pools, a polar bear for the Reykjavík zoo, all kinds of things for weaklings, Disneyland in the Vatnsmýri area, a 'drug-free' Althing by 2020, sustainable transparency, tollbooths on the border with Seltjarnarnes, to do away with all debt, free access to Hljómskálagarðurinn (orchestral rotunda park)."

Both before and after being elected, Jón announced that he would not go in for a coalition government with anyone that had not watched the HBO series The Wire. He is an avid watcher of the series, and stated his favourite character is Omar. Ultimately, his Best Party entered into a coalition with the social-democratic Social Democratic Alliance (Samfylkingin) as its junior partner to govern Reykjavík.

=== Mayor of Reykjavík (2010–2014) ===
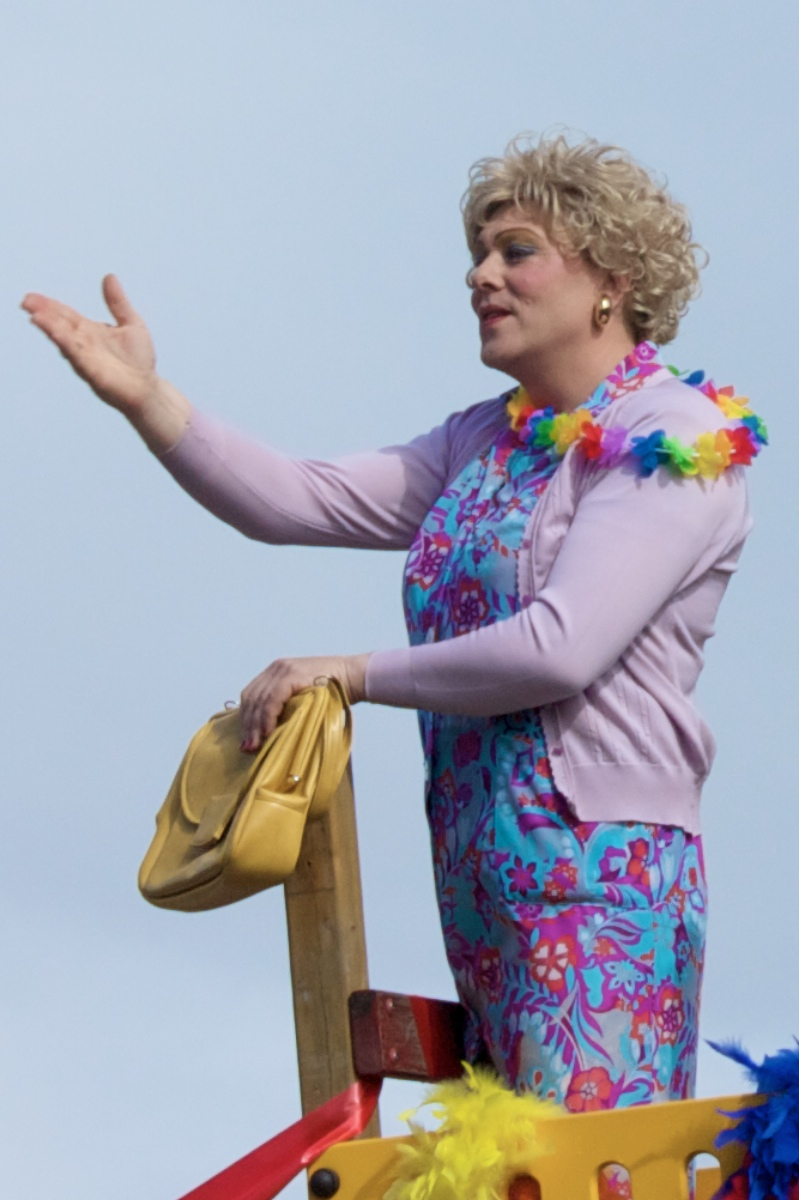
Jón in drag at the head of the Gay pride march through downtown Reykjavík on 7 August 2010

After Jón became mayor of Reykjavík, it was jokingly proposed that the city be nicknamed Gnarrenburg, the title of an earlier television talk show featuring Jón. As mayor, he appeared at the 2010 Gay Pride parade as a drag queen, posted a video holiday greeting wearing a Darth Vader mask and a Santa Claus cap, and suggested a merger with neighboring municipality Kópavogur. Jón protested about the Chinese government's treatment of human rights activist Liu Xiaobo, before the announcement of Liu's award for the 2010 Nobel Peace Prize. He has also stated that he believes the importance of the European Union is highly over-rated. His government also included the granting of long-awaited permission for the construction of Iceland's first purpose-built mosque.

On 30 October 2013, Jón announced that he would not seek a second term in office when his first term expired in June 2014.

=== After leaving office ===
Since leaving office, Jón has campaigned for Iceland to abandon its laws regarding traditional Icelandic names, viewing it as discriminatory, e.g. that only some family names are allowed and Gnarr not an approved one. Jón also authored a book entitled Gnarr!: How I Became the Mayor of a Large City in Iceland and Changed the World. In January 2015 Jón joined the Center for Energy and Environmental Research in the Human Sciences (CENHS) at Rice University as their first writer in residence.

After the incumbent President of Iceland, Ólafur Ragnar Grímsson, announced on 1 January 2016 that he would not run in the upcoming presidential election, it was speculated that Jón would put forward his candidacy. On 15 January 2016, Jón announced he would not be running for office "for the time being", but that he could "think of doing it later", and that he was more interested in working more in Icelandic television.

=== Return to politics and election to the Althing ===
Prior to the 2017 parliamentary election, Jón joined the Social Democratic Alliance as the SDA's campaign manager.

On 2 April 2024 he announced that he would run in the 2024 Icelandic presidential election. He was later confirmed as a candidate. He finished fourth with 10.1% of the votes.

In September 2024, Jón announced that he would join Viðreisn for the upcoming parliamentary elections. He would be elected in the Reykjavík South Althing constituency. Ahead of the election, Jón described himself as "a great anarchist and libertarian and I put a lot of emphasis on the freedom of individuals over their personal lives and this fundamental ideology that people should enjoy freedom as long as it does not undermine the freedom of others. And that our freedom does not concern the government unless certain conditions are met. That distinguishes me from the social democrats," when describing leaving the Social Democratic Alliance for Viðreisn. Viðreisn would join the SDA's government after the election.

== Personal life and family ==
Jón Gnarr is married to Jóhanna Jóhannsdóttir, a close friend of the singer Björk.

== Awards and recognitions ==
- Edda Award
  - 2010 Bjarnfreðarson (Mr Bjarnfredarson) Best Actor of the Year (Winner)
  - 2010 Fangavaktin (The Prisoners Shift) Best Actor of the Year (Winner)
  - 2010 Bjarnfreðarson (Mr Bjarnfredarson) Best Film of the Year (Winner)
  - 2010 Bjarnfreðarson (Mr Bjarnfredarson) Screenplay of the Year (Winner)
  - 2010 Fangavaktin (The Prisoners Shift) TV Drama/Comedy of the Year (Winner)
  - 2008 Dagvaktin (The Day Shift) Screenplay of the Year (Nomination)
  - 2008 Dagvaktin (The Day Shift) TV Drama/Comedy of the Year (Winner)
  - 2007 Næturvaktin (The Night Shift) TV Drama/Comedy of the Year (Winner)
  - 2004 Með mann á bakinu (The Man on the Back) Screenplay of the Year (Winner)
  - 2001 Fóstbræður (Foster Brothers) Best Actor of the Year (Winner)
  - 2000 Íslenski draumurinn (The Icelandic Dream) Supporting Actor of the Year (Nomination)
- 2010 – Visir.is, Person of the Year Award
- 2013 – Honorary member of Samtökin '78, The National Queer Organization of Iceland
- 2013 – Siðmennt, Humanist of the Year Award
- 2014 – LennonOno Grant for Peace Award

== See also ==
- Gnarr, a 2010 Icelandic documentary film about Gnarr's mayoral campaign
- Where to Invade Next

== Notes ==
Political offices
Preceded by Hanna Birna Kristjánsdóttir	Mayor of Reykjavík; 2010–2014	Succeeded by Dagur B. Eggertsson
