= Kvikmyndapod =

Podcast about 21st century Icelandic cinema

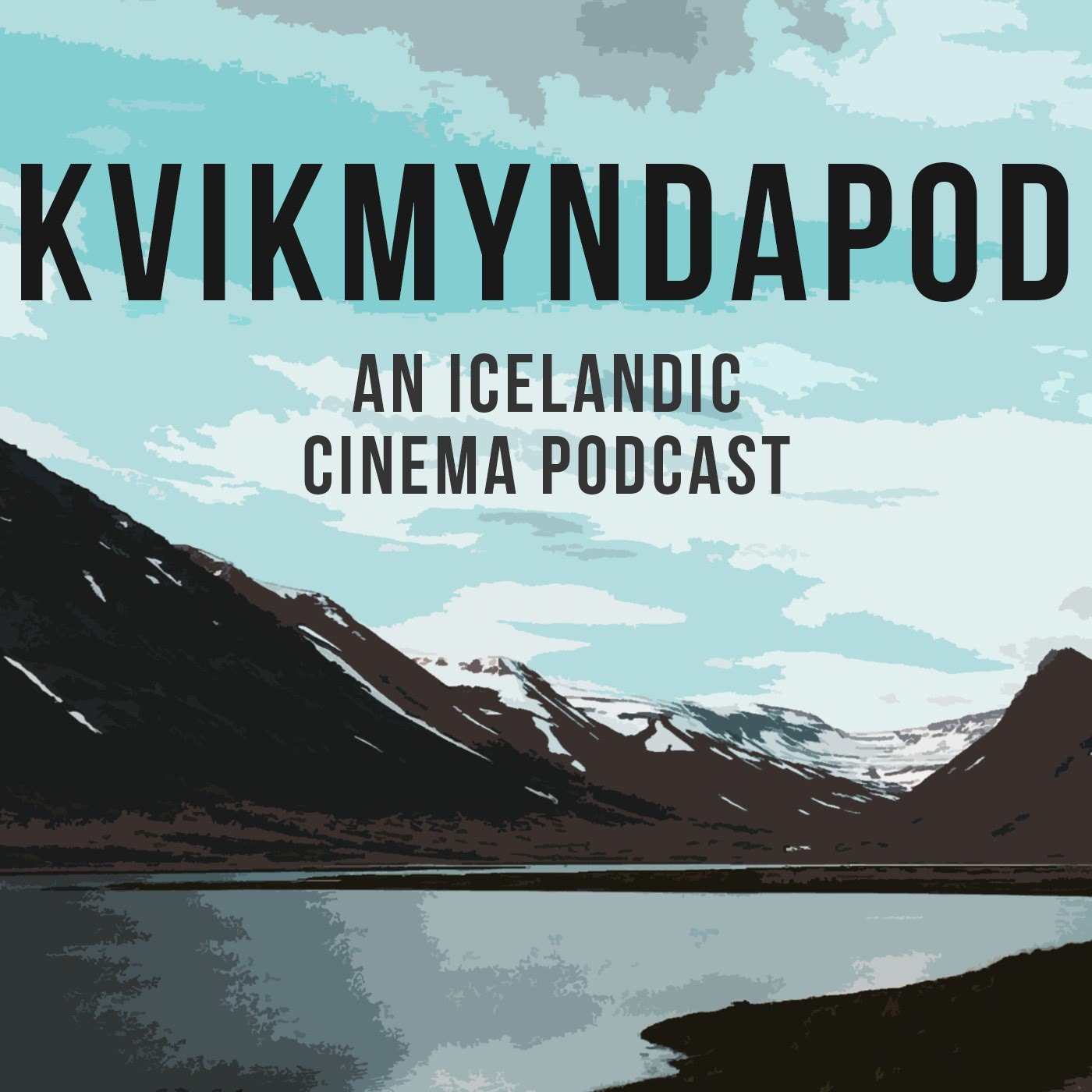
- Cover art
- Genre: Film Reviews
- Language: English

Cast and voices
- Hosted by: Rob Watts; Ellie Cawthorne

Music
- Theme music composed by: Branches Bare

Publication
- No. of seasons: 8
- Original release: 7 May 2021
- Provider: podbean

Related
- Website: kvikmyndapod.podbean.com

Kvikmyndapod: An Icelandic Cinema Podcast is a podcast about 21st century Icelandic cinema, hosted by Rob Watts and Ellie Cawthorne. The name derives from the Icelandic word kvikmynd, meaning film, and the shortened form of the word podcast.

== List of episodes ==
Episode	Date	Icelandic	English	Year	Director
1.1	7 May 2021	An Introduction			
1.2	16 May 2021	Hrútar	Rams	2015	Grímur Hákonarson
1.3	24 May 2021	101 Reykjavík	101 Reykjavík	2000	Baltasar Kormákur
1.4	31 May 2021	Lof mér að falla	Let Me Fall	2018	Baldvin Z
1.5	7 June 2021	Mýrin	Jar City	2006	Baltasar Kormákur
1.6	14 June 2021	Bergmál	Echo	2019	Rúnar Rúnarsson
1.7	21 June 2021	Undir trénu	Under The Tree	2017	Hafsteinn Gunnar Sigurðsson
1.8	28 June 2021	Takk fyrir			
2.1	4 October 2021	Kona fer í stríð	Woman At War	2018	Benedikt Erlingsson
2.2	11 October 2021	Ég man þig	I Remember You	2017	Óskar Þór Axelsson
2.3	18 October 2021	Nói albinói	Noi The Albino	2003	Dagur Kári
2.4	25 October 2021	Amma Lo-Fi	Grandma Lo-Fi	2011	
2.	27 October 2021	Dýrið	Lamb	2021	Valdimar Jóhannsson
2.	27 October 2021	Leynilögga	Cop Secret	2021	Hannes Þór Halldórsson
2.	29 October 2021	Reykjavik Whale Watching Massacre	Reykjavik Whale Watching Massacre	2009	Júlíus Kemp
2.5	1 November 2021	Hvítur, hvítur dagur	A White, White Day	2019	Hlynur Pálmason
2.6	8 November 2021	Andið eðlilega	And Breathe Normally	2018	Ísold Uggadóttir
3.1	28 February 2022	Dýrið	Lamb	2021	Valdimar Jóhannsson
3.2	7 March 2022	Þriðji póllinn	The Hero’s Journey To The Third Pole	2020	
3.3	14 March 2022	Reykjavik-Rotterdam	Reykjavik-Rotterdam	2008	Óskar Jónasson
3.4	21 March 2022	Hross í oss	Of Horses And Men	2013	Benedikt Erlingsson
3.5	28 March 2022	Málmhaus	Metalhead	2013	Ragnar Bragason
3.6	4 April 2022	Hjartasteinn	Heartstone	2016	Guðmundur Arnar Guðmundsson
3.7	26 August 2022	Nest	Nest	2022	Hlynur Pálmason
4.1	14 October 2022	Djúpið	The Deep	2012	Baltasar Kormákur
4.2	21 October 2022	Héraðið	The County	2019	Grímur Hákonarson
4.3	28 October 2022	It Hatched	It Hatched	2021	Elvar Gunnarsson
4.3	28 October 2022	Þorsti	Thirst	2019	
4.4	4 November 2022	Volaða Land	Godland	2022	Hlynur Pálmason
4.5	11 November 2022	Gnarr	Gnarr	2010	Gaukur Úlfarsson
4.6	18 November 2022	Vonarstræti	Life In A Fishbowl	2014	Baldvin Z
4.7	19 December 2022	Christmas! aka Jól!			
5.1	29 January 2023	Berdreymi	Beautiful Beings	2022	Guðmundur Arnar Guðmundsson
5.2	27 February 2023	My Year of Dicks	My Year of Dicks	2022	Sara Gunnarsdóttir
5.3	20 March 2023	Skjálfti	Quake	2021	Tinna Hrafnsdóttir
5.4	6 April 2023	Volaða Land	Godland	2022	Hlynur Pálmason
5.5	22 May 2023	Rökkur	Rift	2017	Erlingur Thoroddsen
5.6	31 July 2023	Napóleonsskjölin	Operation Napoleon	2023	Óskar Þór Axelsson
6.1	16 February 2024	Villibráð	Wild Game	2023	Elsa María Jakobsdóttir
6.2	23 February 2024	Svar við bréfi Helgu	A Letter from Helga	2022	Ása Helga Hjörleifsdóttir
6.3	1 March 2024	Á ferð með mömmu	Driving Mum	2022	Hilmar Oddsson
6.4	8 March 2024	Grimmd	Cruelty	2016	Anton Sigurðsson
6.5	15 March 2024	Northern Comfort	Northern Comfort	2023	Hafsteinn Gunnar Sigurðsson
6.6	22 March 2024	Eiðurinn	The Oath	2016	Baltasar Kormákur
7.1	6 August 2024	Heimaleikurinn	The Home Game	2023	Smari Gunn; Logi Sigursveinsson
7.2	25 October 2024	Beast	Beast	2022	Baltasar Kormákur
7.3	1 November 2024	Ljósbrot	When The Light Breaks	2024	Rúnar Rúnarsson
7.3	1 November 2024	Fár	Fár	2023	Gunnur Martinsdóttir Schlüter
7.4	20 December 2024	Sumarljós og svo kemur nóttin	Summerlight... and Then Comes the Night	2022	Elfar Aðalsteins
7.5	16 January 2025	The Damned	The Damned	2024	Thordur Palsson
7.6	20 February 2025	Snerting	Touch	2024	Baltasar Kormákur
8.1	12 March 2026	Ástin Sem Eftir Er	The Love That Remains	2025	Hlynur Pálmason
8.2	2 July 2026	Kuldi	Cold	2023	Erlingur Thoroddsen
8.3	28 September 2026	Apex	Apex	2026	Baltasar Kormákur

== See also ==
- Cinema of Iceland
