= Elfar Aðalsteins =

Icelandic film director (born 1971)

- Born: 1 June 1971 (age 55); Reykjavik, Iceland
- Occupations: Film director, screenwriter, producer

Elfar Aðalsteins (born 1 June 1971, also known as Elfar Adalsteins) is an Icelandic film director, screenwriter, and producer. He studied filmmaking at the Met Film School at Ealing Studios and has an MA in screenwriting from Goldsmiths University, London.

== Career ==
His short film, Sailcloth (2011), starring John Hurt, was shortlisted for the 2012 Academy Awards and the British Film & Television Awards.

Aðalsteins’ directorial feature debut, End of Sentence (2019), a father-and-son road movie, starring Oscar nominee John Hawkes (Winter's Bones, The Sessions) and Logan Lerman (The Perks of Being a Wallflower) had its worldwide release in 2019. The film received positive reviews, with Guy Lodge from Variety describing it as a “A deliberate, gentle, genuinely caring debut feature from Icelandic director Elfar Adalsteins... [with] John Hawkes and Logan Lerman, both on very fine form” while Stephen Dalton from The Hollywood Reporter said “End of Sentence is a familiar story at heart, but beautifully observed, sensitively played and smart enough to wrong-foot audience expectations whenever the plot gets too comfortable.”

In Summerlight... and Then Comes the Night (2022), Aðalsteins directed an all Icelandic ensemble cast including Ólafur Darri Ólafsson (Trapped, The Secret Life of Walter Mitty), Heida Reed (Poldark) and Sara Dögg Ásgeirsdóttir (True Detective, A White, White Day), from his own screenplay adaptation of Jón Kalman Stefánsson’s celebrated novel, which received the Icelandic Literary Awards in 2006. The film premiered in the Best of Festival selection at Tallinn Black Nights IFF in 2022, was awarded Best Nordic Film Award at the Santa Barbara IFF and was nominated for five Icelandic Film and Television Awards, including Best Picture.

As a producer, Aðalsteins has worked on a wide range of independent films, including Mamma Gógó (2010), What Maisie Knew (2012) and the award winning Icelandic documentary The Home Game (2023).

== Personal life ==
Aðalsteins is married to Anna Maria Pitt, a jewellery artist who has made appearances in his films.

== Filmography ==
Year	Title	Role	Awards
2011	Subculture	Director, Screenwriter, Producer	
2011	Sailcloth	Director, Screenwriter, Producer	Grand Jury Prize for Best Short at Rhode Island International Film Festival (2011). Best Short Film at the Sedona Film Festival in Arizona (2012). Official Nomination Academy Awards® Shortlist (2012).
2019	End of Sentence	Director, Producer	Special Jury Award at the 68th International Filmfestival Mannheim-Heidelberg (2019).
2022	Summerlight... and Then Comes the Night	Director, Screenwriter, Producer	Best Nordic Film Award at the Santa Barbara International Film Festival (SBIFF) (2023).
