= Summerlight... and Then Comes the Night =

2022 Icelandic film

Summerlight… and Then Comes the Night
- Poster
- Icelandic: Sumarljós og svo kemur nóttin
- Directed by: Elfar Aðalsteins
- Screenplay by: Elfar Aðalsteins
- Based on: Sumarljós og svo kemur nóttin by Jón Kalman Stefánsson
- Produced by: Rúnar Ingi Einarsson; Sara Nassim
- Starring: Sveinn Ólafur Gunnarsson; Atli Óskar Fjalarsson; Sara Dögg Ásgeirsdóttir; Ólafur Darri Ólafsson; Svandís Dóra Einarsdóttir; Víkingur Kristjánsson; Heida Reed; Ebba Guðný Guðmundsdóttir; Anna María Pitt; Þorsteinn Bachmann; Jóhann Sigurðarson; Sigurður Ingvarsson; María Dögg Nelson; Hinrik Ólafsson; Vigdís Grímsdóttir
- Cinematography: David Williamson
- Release date: 8 October 2022 (Reykjavík International Film Festival)
- Running time: 110 minutes
- Country: Iceland
- Language: Icelandic

Summerlight… and Then Comes the Night (Icelandic: Sumarljós og svo kemur nóttin) is a 2022 Icelandic tragicomedy directed by Elfar Aðalsteins, who also wrote the screenplay. In the film, set in a tiny Icelandic village, Elfar directed an all-Icelandic ensemble cast including Ólafur Darri Ólafsson, Heida Reed and Sara Dögg Ásgeirsdóttir, from his own screenplay adaptation of Jón Kalman Stefánsson’s celebrated novel of the same name from 2005, which received the Icelandic Literary Awards in 2006. The film premiered in the Best of Festival selection at Tallinn Black Nights IFF in 2022, was awarded Best Nordic Film Award at the Santa Barbara IFF and nominated for five Icelandic Film and Television Awards, including Best Picture.
