= Arni Larusson =

Icelandic actor (born 1993)

Árni Þór Lárusson
- Born: 1993 (age 32–33); Reykjavík, Iceland
- Other name: Arni Larusson
- Education: London Academy of Music and Dramatic Art
- Occupations: Actor, voice actor
- Years active: 2007–present

Árni Þór Lárusson (born 1993), also known as Arni Larusson, is an Icelandic actor and voice performer. He came to international attention through his role as Bjartur in the CBS Studios drama series The Darkness (2024), directed by Lasse Hallström and starring Lena Olin, which was praised by Nordic Watchlist as "one of the highlights of the series". He has also appeared in True Detective: Night Country (HBO, 2024) and the Netflix feature film Against the Ice (2022).

== Early life and education ==
Lárusson was born in Reykjavík in 1993. He began acting as a teenager in school and youth theatre productions, including Bugsy Malone (2007) and Dýrin í Hálsaskógi (2008) at Hagaskóli, and later with the student theatre group Herranótt at Menntaskólinn í Reykjavík. His early stage roles included Lovestar (2009), A Midsummer Night's Dream (2011), and Doctor Faustus Lights the Lights (2013), all of which were covered by Morgunblaðið.

Morgunblaðið profiled his move to London to study acting at the London Academy of Music and Dramatic Art (LAMDA). At LAMDA he appeared in academy productions including Don Carlos, The Cherry Orchard, Uncle Vanya, A Midsummer Night's Dream, and 'Tis a Pity She's a Whore, graduating in 2019.

== Career ==
=== Stage ===
After graduating from LAMDA, Lárusson joined the Reykjavík City Theatre (Borgarleikhúsið). In 2021, Kjarninn published a review of the theatre's production of Gosi (Pinocchio), in which Lárusson performed the title role, praising his portrayal and connection with audiences. Morgunblaðið also covered the production.

Later in 2021, Vísir reported on how Lárusson stepped into the production Veisla at the Reykjavík City Theatre with only a few days' notice after a fellow cast member was placed in COVID-19 quarantine. The theatre's artistic director praised his versatility, noting that he performed acting, singing, dancing, and piano-playing in the production.

In 2022, Vísir reported on Lárusson stepping into the lead role of Bubbi Morthens in the musical 9 Líf at short notice, describing the challenges of assuming the role and the production's decision to proceed rather than cancel the performance.

Lestrarklefinn discussed his appearance in the production Veisla in a 2023 theatre review.

=== Film and television ===
Lárusson appeared as Minister's Secretary in the Netflix feature film Against the Ice (2022), directed by Peter Flinth.

In January 2024, both Deadline Hollywood and The Hollywood Reporter reported on his casting as Bjartur in the CBS Studios and Stampede Ventures drama The Darkness, an English-language six-episode series directed by Lasse Hallström and starring Lena Olin, based on the novels of Ragnar Jónasson. The Hollywood Reporter identified him alongside his prior credits in True Detective and Against the Ice. The series, which filmed in Reykjavík, was subsequently acquired by Channel 4 in the UK, SkyShowtime across Europe, SBS in Australia, and Showcase in Canada, as reported by Variety.

Lárusson appeared in one episode of the HBO series True Detective: Night Country (2024), credited as Gordon.

=== Voice and video games ===
Lárusson has worked as a voice actor in video games, including the role of Sichfrith in Assassin's Creed: Valhalla (2020) and its expansion Wrath of the Druids (2021) by Ubisoft, and Lord of Khorne in Total War: Warhammer III (2022) by Creative Assembly. He also voiced Peter Parker / Spider-Man in the Icelandic dub of Spider-Man: Across the Spider-Verse (2023).

== Reception ==
Lárusson's performance as Bjartur in The Darkness received specific praise from critics. Nordic Watchlist described his portrayal as "one of the highlights of the series" and "a beautifully portrayed view of light and shade", contrasting it favourably with other performances in the production.

In Icelandic media, Kjarninn praised his work in the title role of Gosi (Pinocchio) at the Reykjavík City Theatre, noting his ability to balance the character's contrasting qualities and his connection with the audience. Vísir reported on multiple occasions about his ability to take on lead roles at short notice, with the artistic director of the Reykjavík City Theatre describing him as a versatile performer.
