= Sara Dögg Ásgeirsdóttir =

Icelandic actress

- Born: December 1976 (age 49); Iceland
- Occupation: Actress
- Years active: 2000–present
- Notable work: Pressa, Ég man þig, Stella Blómkvist
- Children: 2
- Awards: Edda Award for Best Leading Actress (2013)

Sara Dögg Ásgeirsdóttir (born December 1976) is an Icelandic actress. She has had major roles in a number of Icelandic films and TV series, and in 2013 won the Edda Award for Best Leading Actress for Pressa.

== Early life and education ==
Sara was born and grew up on the family farm in Skeiða- og Gnúpverjahreppur. She attended Fjölbrautaskólinn í Breiðholti from the age of 16, in the media track, and after a half year in France studying French, enrolled at the University of Iceland to study psychology. After her first film role, she returned to France, living in Paris, and then studied acting in Iceland at the Iceland University of the Arts, graduating in 2005.

== Career ==
Her first acting role was as the female lead, Þurildur, in Hrafn Gunnlaugsson's Witchcraft (2000), for which she auditioned successfully in 1997 when she was 19 and in her first year of university, with no training in acting; she later told an interviewer she had been too shy to join her school's drama club. Her performance won a Best Actress award at the Bucheon International Fantastic Film Festival.

While studying acting, she had supporting roles in two further films, Kaldaljós and the short Hver er Barði? (Who is Bardi?) (both 2004). On graduation, she was offered a place in a theatre company in Akureyri, but took time off to have her first child. She resumed work with an independent theatre company, and in following years worked in a variety of acting jobs, including for the Reykjavík City Theatre, while also working as a flight attendant for Flugfélag Íslands.

In 2007 Sara had a supporting role in the TV series Næturvaktin; her breakthrough role was as the journalist Lára in the TV series Pressa, beginning in December the same year. Pressa was very successful, and in 2013 she won the Edda Award for Best Leading Actress for the third season.

Caring for her children during her daughter's illness caused a three-year hiatus in her career. Her work since then has included, in film, leading parts in Óskar Þór Axelsson's Ég man þig (2017), based on a novel by Yrsa Sigurðardóttir, the 2019 Swedish-Icelandic co-production Pity the Lovers, and Marteinn Þórsson's Þorpið í bakgarðinum (Backyard Village, 2021), and a supporting role in Hvítur, hvítur dagur (2019). On TV, she appeared in the 2016 comedy series Borgarstjórinn (The Mayor) and had a supporting role in the 2017 series Stella Blómkvist, which became a major role in the 2021 season.

In 2024 Sara produced her first short documentary, Turninn, about the tower which her father built on his land. The documentary premiered at the Skjaldborg Documentary Festival

== Personal life ==
Sara has a daughter and a son. She did not attend the Edda Awards ceremony when she won because her son was a newborn.

== Filmography ==
Films
Year	Title	Role	Notes
1999	Myrkrahöfðinginn	Þurildur	
2004	Kaldaljós	Anna	
2004	Hver er Barði? (Who is Bardi?)	Supporting cast	
2006	Börn	Actress	
2012	Afhjupunin	Kristin	Short film
2017	Ég man þig	Dagný	
2018	Pity the Lovers	Anna	
2019	Hvítur, hvítur dagur (A White, White Day)	Ingimundur's wife	
2021	Þorpið í bakgarðinum (Backyard Village)	Ásta the Greenhouse Farmer	
2022	Summerlight... and Then Comes the Night	Ásdís	
2023	Kuldi	Diljá Davíðsdóttir	
2024	Ljósvíkingar (Odd Fish)	Lija	

TV Series
Year	Title	Role	Notes
2007	Næturvaktin (The Night Shift)	Erna	TV miniseries, 3 episodes
2010	Réttur	Helena	1 episode
2007–2012	Pressa	Lára	Main role, 3 seasons
2016	Borgarstjórinn (The Mayor)	Védís	4 episodes
2017–2021	Stella Blómkvist	Dagbjört	
2022	Vitjanir (Fractures)	Kristín	Main role
2024	True Detective	Becks Bryce	1 episode
2024	Black Sands (TV series)	Helga (young)	2 episodes
2024	The Darkness (TV series)	Forensic technician	6 episodes
2025	Everybody Loves Horses	Krúnka	

Theatre
Year	Title	Role	Venue	Notes
2004	Midsummer Night's Dream	Hermia	Iceland Academy of the Arts	
2005	Spítalaskipið	Issa the Captain	Iceland Academy of Arts	
2005	Dreamplay	Victoria	Reykjavík City Theatre	
2006	Þjóðarsálin	Soffía	Gustur riding hall	
2007	Eilíf hamingja	Agnes	Reykjavík City Theatre	
2007	Grettir	Bredda	Reykjavík City Theatre	
2007	Funny Money	Bibi	Reykjavík City Theatre	
2008	Together	Elisabet	Reykjavík City Theatre	
2008	Fýsn	Fanney	Reykjavík City Theatre	
2008-9	Lápur og Skrápur	Sunna	Reykjavík City Theatre	
2010	Eilíf Óhamingja	Agnes	Reykjavík City Theatre	
2010	Romeo and Juliet	Lady Capulet	Reykjavík City Theatre	
2016	Icelandic Sagas - The Greatest Hits	Storyteller, various roles	Harpa (concert hall)	
2023	Venus Í Feldi	Vanda	Tjarnarbíó Theatre, Reykjavík	

Documentaries
Year	Title	Role	Venue	Notes
2024	Turninn	Director/writer/producer	Skjaldborg Festival	Self produced short documentary

== Awards ==
- 2000: Best Actress Bucheon International Fantastic Film Festival
- 2013: Edda Award for Best Leading Actress, Pressa
