= Saga Garðarsdóttir =

Icelandic stand-up comedian and actress (born 1987)

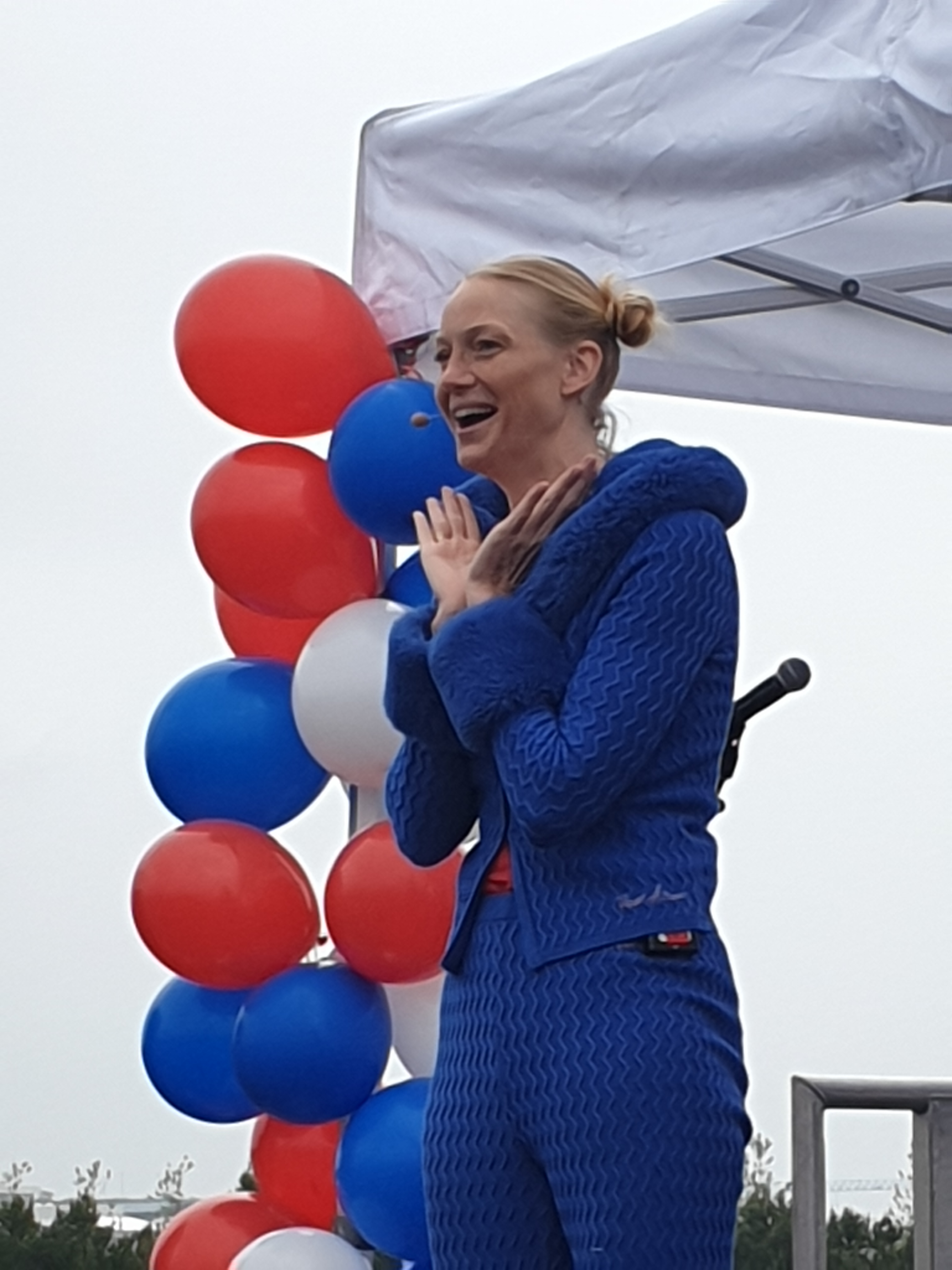
- Born: 6 August 1987 (age 39); Reykjavík, Iceland
- Education: Iceland Academy of the Arts
- Spouse: Snorri Helgason

Comedy career
- Years active: 2012–present
- Medium: Stand-up comedy, theatre, television, film

Saga Garðarsdóttir (born 6 August 1987) is an Icelandic stand-up comedian, actress and singer. She graduated from the Iceland Academy of the Arts in 2012. She is known for Hreinn Skjöldur, Steypustöðin, and Stella Blómkvist.

== Personal life ==
Saga started playing football at the age of six with KR. In 2004, she appeared in one match with the KR women's team in the top-tier Landsbankadeild kvenna, substituting for Hólmfríður Magnúsdóttir on the 87th minute in a 5–1 victory against Stjarnan. In 2014, Saga started dating musician Snorri Helgason. On 28 February 2018 Saga gave birth to their first child.

== Filmography ==
=== Film ===
Year	Title	Role	Notes
2013	Ibiza		Short film
2015	Bakk	Blær	
2017	Lightcatcher	Bandit 7	Short film
2018	Woman at War	Police officer	
2025	The Love That Remains	Anna	

=== Television ===
Year	Title	Role	Notes
2014–2015	Hreinn Skjöldur		6 episodes
2017–2018	Steypustöðin	Various	12 episodes
2017	Áramótaskaupið 2017	Various	
2019	Áramótaskaupið 2019	Various	
2020	Áramótaskaupið 2020	Various	
2021	Straumar	Various	Mini-series
2021	Stella Blómkvist	Myrra	
2022	Áramótaskaupið 2022	Various	
2023	Afturelding	Hekla	
