= Iceland Noir =

Literary festival in Reykjavík, Iceland

- Genre: Literary festival (crime fiction; later multi-genre)
- Date: November
- Frequency: Annual (biennial 2014–2020)
- Locations: Reykjavík, Iceland
- Years active: 12–13
- Inaugurated: November 2013
- Founders: Yrsa Sigurðardóttir, Ragnar Jónasson, Quentin Bates
- Website: icelandnoir.com

Iceland Noir is an annual literary festival held in Reykjavík, Iceland, in November. Founded in 2013 by crime writers Yrsa Sigurðardóttir, Ragnar Jónasson and Quentin Bates, it began as a festival dedicated to crime fiction and has since broadened into a multi-genre event covering literature, film and television, described by its organisers as a festival "celebrating darkness in all its forms".

== History ==
=== Founding and early years ===
The idea for the festival arose from a conversation between Sigurðardóttir, Jónasson and Bates about the absence of a dedicated crime fiction festival in Iceland; the plan took shape when the three met again at the CrimeFest convention in Bristol. Before the first edition had taken place, The Guardian included Iceland Noir in a list of the world's best crime fiction festivals, a distinction the organisers noted with some amusement given that the festival had not yet been held.

The first Iceland Noir took place as a one-day event at the Nordic House in Reykjavík in November 2013, with English author Ann Cleeves among the participants. Icelandic crime writer Lilja Sigurðardóttir joined the organising team in 2014.

The festival was initially held every other year. In 2015 the organisers lent the festival's slot to Shetland, where the spin-off festival Shetland Noir was held at Mareel in Lerwick in November 2015, organised by Shetland Arts and Promote Shetland in association with Iceland Noir and with artistic input from Ann Cleeves.

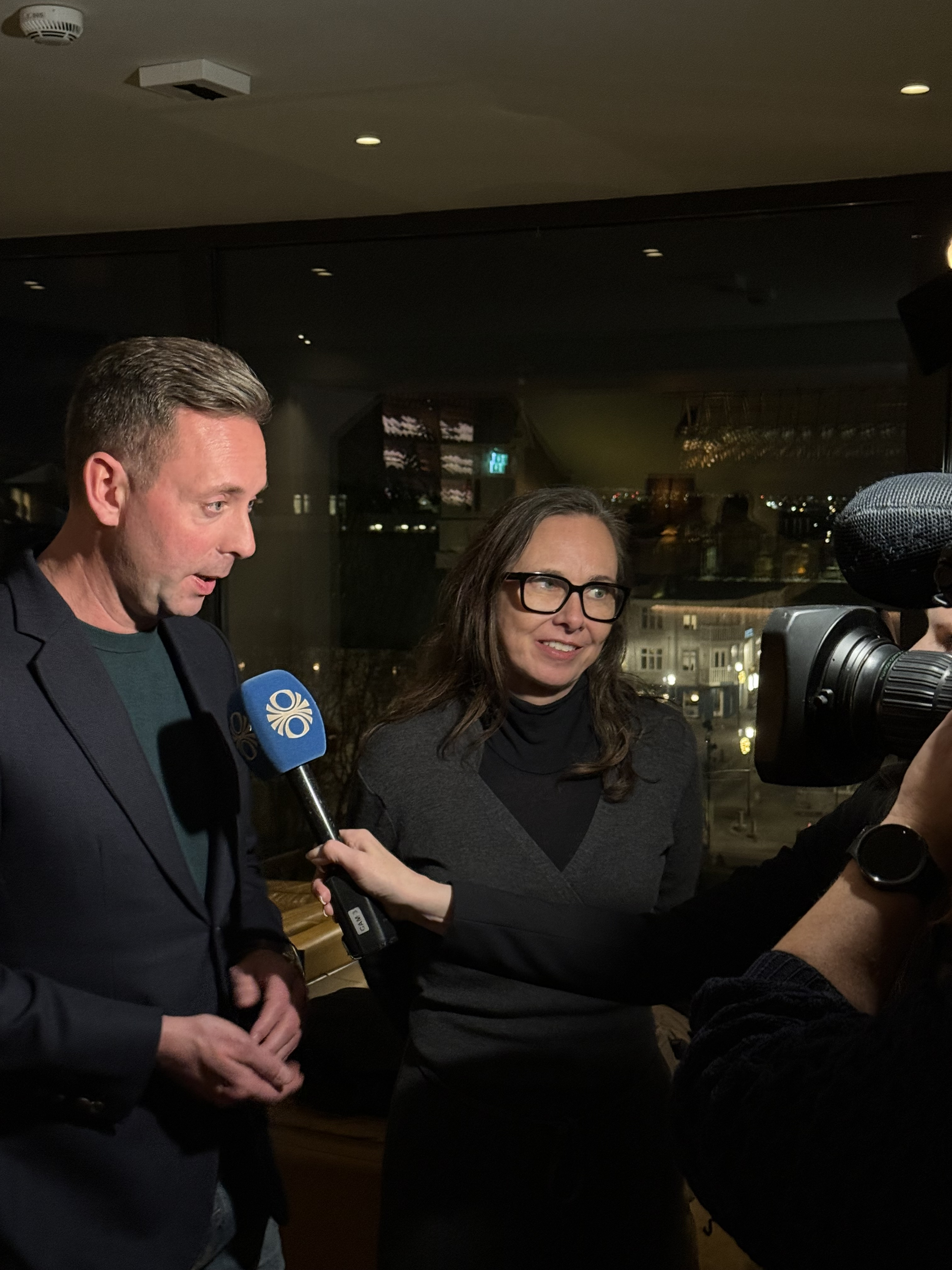
Ragnar Jónasson and Yrsa Sigurðardóttir being interviewed by RÚV at Iceland Noir 2025

=== 2020s ===
The 2020 festival was cancelled due to the COVID-19 pandemic, with the organisers announcing editions in both 2021 and 2022 instead. The 2021 festival was held on 16–20 November 2021; participants were received by the First Lady of Iceland, Eliza Reid, at Bessastaðir. The festival has been held annually since. In 2022, some 225 guests attended alongside 82 authors and moderators, the largest edition to that point.

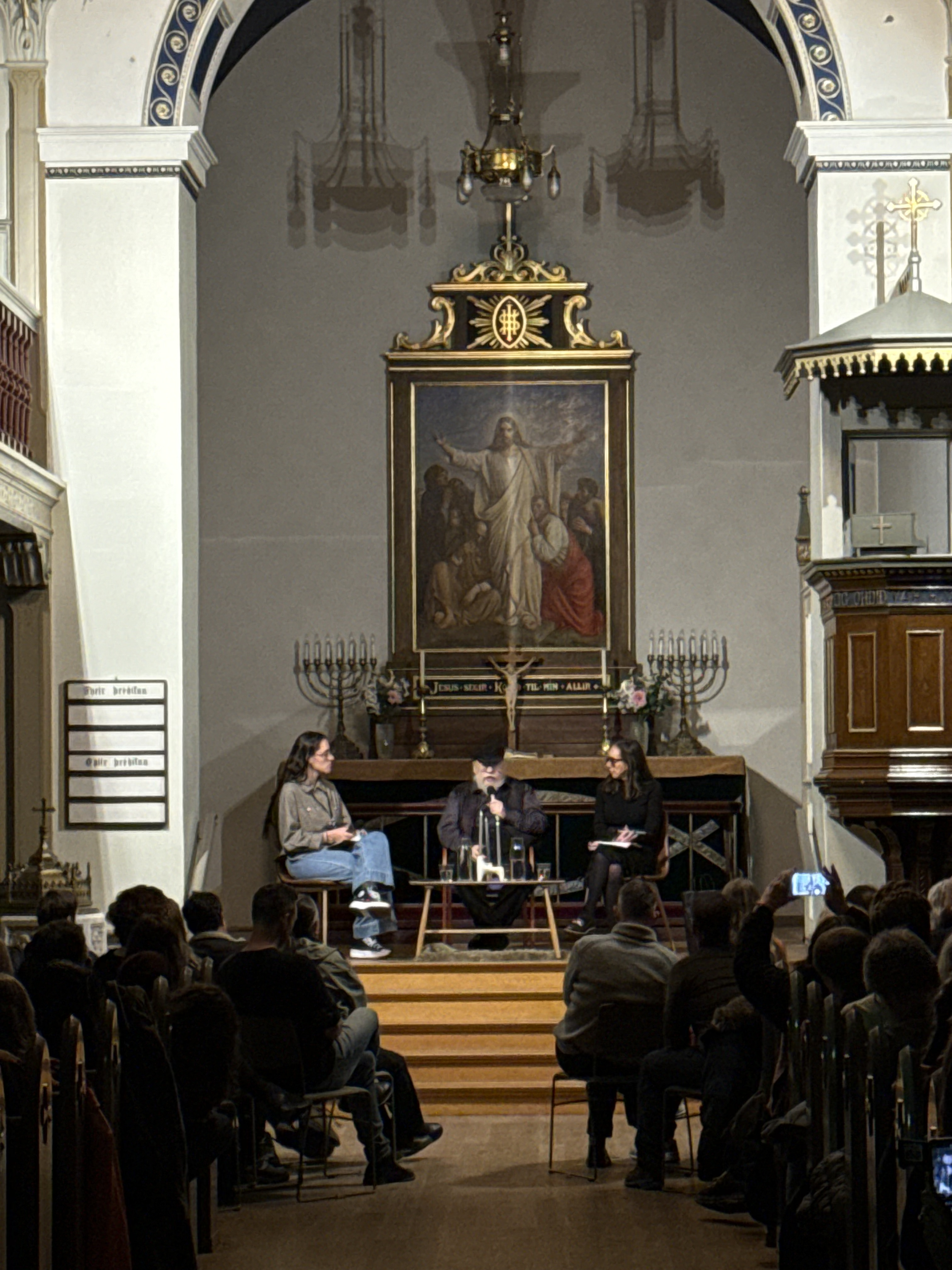
An evening with George R. R. Martin in Fríkirkjan at Iceland Noir

The 2023 edition marked a significant expansion in scale and profile, with headline guests including Hillary Clinton, Dan Brown, Neil Gaiman, Louise Penny, Lisa Jewell, Richard Armitage and Irvine Welsh, and events held in the Harpa concert hall. The 2024 festival, held on 20–23 November, featured guests including Sara Blædel, David Baddiel, Brenda Blethyn, Ann Cleeves and David Walliams.

The 2025 festival took place on 12–15 November with headliners including George R. R. Martin, Squid Game creator Hwang Dong-hyuk, Colm Tóibín, Emily St. John Mandel, Siri Hustvedt, Nicola Sturgeon, Chris Whitaker, and film figures Lasse Hallström and Lena Olin. The 2026 edition is scheduled for 11–14 November, with announced guests including Arnaldur Indriðason, Sofi Oksanen, Makoto Yukimura, Kim Stanley Robinson, Tove Alsterdal and Lee Child.

== Format and venues ==
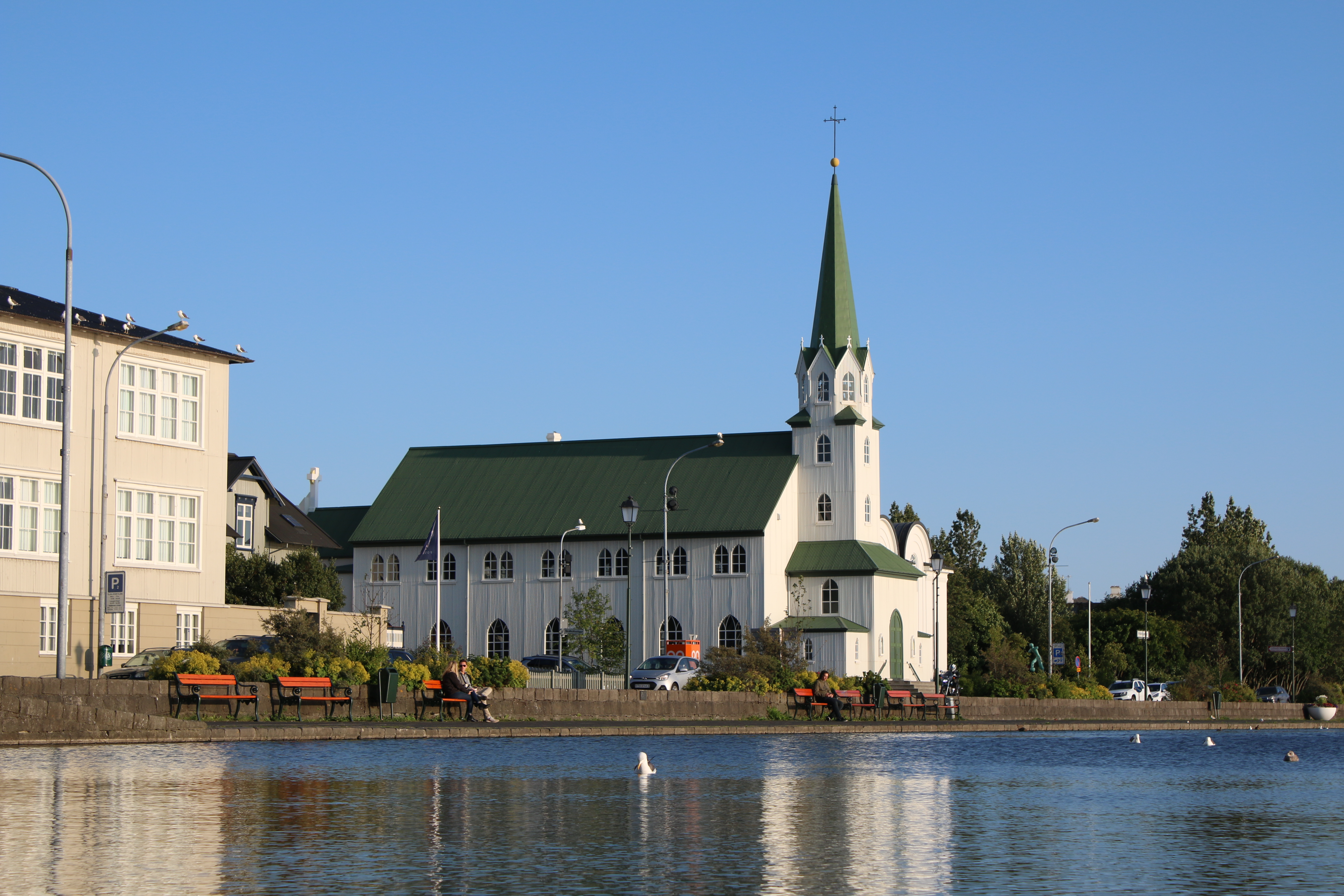
The Fríkirkjan Church in Reykjavík

The festival is held over several days in November in central Reykjavík, with events in multiple venues within walking distance of one another; venues have included Fríkirkjan, the artists' club Vinnustofa Kjarval, and, for larger headline events, Harpa. The programme consists of author panels, interviews and fringe events, and in recent years has extended to film, television, poetry and other storytelling media; the festival language is English. The festival is largely funded by participants rather than public subsidies, and has received support from Reykjavík UNESCO City of Literature and Promote Iceland.

== Icepick Award ==
Since 2014 the festival has been associated with the Icepick Award (Icelandic: Ísnálin), presented to the best crime novel published in Icelandic translation, judged on the quality of both the original work and the translation. The award was founded by Iceland Noir together with the Icelandic Association of Translators and Interpreters and the Icelandic Crime Writing Association. The inaugural award in 2014 went to Joël Dicker's The Truth About the Harry Quebert Affair and its Icelandic translator Friðrik Rafnsson; the 2018 award went to Jo Nesbø's The Son and its Icelandic translator.

== See also ==
- Icelandic literature
- Nordic noir
