= Svandís =

Svandís is a given name. Notable people with the name include:

- Svandís Dóra Einarsdóttir (born 1984), Icelandic actress
- Svandís Svavarsdóttir (born 1964), Icelandic politician
