= Þorvaldur Davíð Kristjánsson =

Icelandic actor

- Born: 27 September 1983 (age 42); Reykjavík, Iceland
- Other names: Thorvaldur Kristjansson; Thor Kristjansson
- Education: Juilliard School (BFA); Balliol College, Oxford (MBA)
- Occupations: Actor; writer
- Known for: Svartur á leik; Dracula Untold; I Remember You; A Letter from Helga; The Minister
- Relatives: Kristján Þorvaldsson (father)

Þorvaldur Davíð Kristjánsson (born 27 September 1983), also known as Thorvaldur Kristjansson, is an Icelandic actor.

== Biography ==
Þorvaldur was born in Reykjavík to journalist Kristján Þorvaldsson and Helga Jóna Óðinsdóttir, and first found fame as the voice of Simba in the Icelandic language version of Disney’s 1994 film The Lion King and Lion King (2019). Subsequent voiceovers include appearances in Brother Bear, Happy Feet and Ratatouille. Þorvaldur has performed in many of Iceland's most renowned theaters, including The Icelandic National Theater and Reykjavik City Theater. He moved to New York in 2007 to pursue a BFA in The Juilliard School’s Drama Division, where he graduated in 2011 as a member of Group 40. His education was fully funded by scholarships and through the personal assistance of the Academy Award winner and former Juilliard alumni Robin Williams. He also studied at the University of Oxford in the UK, where he is a lifelong member of Balliol College.

Þorvaldur had his first leading role, in the feature film Svartur á leik (English: Black's game), a year after his graduation from The Juilliard School. When Black's Game opened in Iceland it became the biggest box office hit in 2012 and the 2nd-highest-grossing Icelandic movie in history.

Þorvaldur's first Hollywood studio film was Dracula Untold, produced by Universal Pictures, Legendary Pictures and Michael De Luca. It was directed by Gary Shore and starred Luke Evans, Dominic Cooper, Sarah Gadon and Samantha Barks. Þorvaldur played Bright Eyes, an Eastern European taken as a slave as a young boy who became a vicious assassin in the Ottoman Army.

Þorvaldur has been both nominated for and won the Edda Award for his performances in various roles in television and film over the years. Additionally, he has participated in numerous theater productions, including receiving a Gríma Award nomination for his portrayal of Christopher Boone in The Curious Incident of the Dog in the Night-Time, staged at the Reykjavík City Theatre. In 2023, Þorvaldur was chosen as one of the European Shooting Stars at the Berlinale Film Festival. He has also received various awards and honors for his work in the field of acting, such as the American Scandinavian Foundation Cultural Grant and a nomination as an Outstanding Young Icelander by the JCI organization.

Þorvaldur has published three children’s books. In 2023, he released his first children’s book in collaboration with Bergrún Íris Sævarsdóttir, titled Sokkalabbarnir: Ný Veröld. This book is the first in the 'Sokkalabbarnir' series. Two more books in the same series, Sóli fer á Ströndina and Grændís: Græn af öfund, were published in 2024. The series is designed for beginner readers. Þorvaldur received a scriptwriting grant from the Icelandic Film Centre to develop a television series based on the 'Sokklabbarnir' series. The series is currently in development.

Þorvaldur lives in Laugardalur, Reykjavík, with his wife and three children.

== Filmography ==
- Reykjavik Whale Watching Massacre (2009)
- Svartur á leik (2012)
- Dracula Untold (2014)
- Life in a Fishbowl (2014)
- I Remember You (2017)
- The Swan (2017)
- White Lines (2020)
- The Minister (2020)
- Yes-People (2021)
- A Letter from Helga (2022)
- The Minister 2 (2024)
- Darkness (2024)
- Útilega (2024)
