= Afturelding (TV series) =

Icelandic television series

- Afturelding
- Genre: Drama
- Created by: Hafsteinn Gunnar Sigurðsson; Dóri DNA
- Written by: Katrín Björgvinsdóttir; Hafsteinn Gunnar Sigurðsson; Dóri DNA; Jörundur Ragnarsson; Jóhanna Friðrika Sæmundsdóttir
- Directed by: Hafsteinn Gunnar Sigurðsson; Elsa Maria Jakobsdóttir; Gagga Jonsdottir
- Starring: Ingvar E. Sigurðsson; Svandís Dóra Einarsdóttir; Saga Garðarsdóttir
- Country of origin: Iceland
- Original language: Icelandic
- No. of seasons: 1
- No. of episodes: 8

Production
- Producers: Birgitta Bjornsdóttir; Ragnheiður Erlingsdóttir; Arnar Benjamín Kristjánsson; Skúli Fr. Malmquist; Þór Sigurjónsson
- Production company: ZikZak

Original release
- Network: RÚV
- Release: 9 April 2023

Afturelding (Icelandic pronunciation: [ˈaftʏrˌɛltiŋk]) is an Icelandic TV series written by Hafsteinn Gunnar Sigurðsson og Dóri DNA. It stars Ingvar E. Sigurðsson as a burnt-out former handball star from the 1980s who takes over the coaching of Afturelding's women's team after years of drunkenness. The series also features Svandís Dóra Einarsdóttir and Saga Garðarsdóttir.

== Cast ==
- Ingvar E. Sigurðsson as Skarphéðinn, a burnt-out former handball star
- Svandís Dóra Einarsdóttir as Brynja, a former professional player who has returned to Iceland to play for the team
- Saga Garðarsdóttir as Hekla, a player for Afturelding/Skarphéðins biological daughter.
- Þorsteinn Bachmann as Eysteinn, CEO of Afturelding and former handball player. Skarphéðin's old teammate.
- Sverrir Þór Sverrisson as Björgvin, Afturelding's assistant coach
- Steinunn Ólína Þorsteinsdóttir as Rún, Hekla's mother/Skarphéðins former girlfriend
- Jóhann Sigurðarson as Rúrík, the chairman of Afturelding
- Halldóra Geirharðsdóttir as María, the chairman of the Icelandic Handball Association
- Nína Dögg Filippusdóttir as Stella, a board member of Afturelding
- María Thelma Smáradóttir as an Afturelding player
- Vala Kristín Eiríksdóttir as Skarphéðinn's daughter
- Vilhelm Neto as Jesper
- Jörundur Ragnarsson as Hannes, Brynja's ex-husband
