= End of Sentence =

2019 drama film

- Film poster
- Directed by: Elfar Adalsteins
- Screenplay by: Michael Armbruster
- Produced by: Elfar Adalsteins; David Collins; Sigurjón Sighvatsson
- Starring: John Hawkes; Logan Lerman; Sarah Bolger
- Cinematography: Karl Oskarsson
- Edited by: Kristján Loðmfjörð
- Release dates: 30 June 2019 (Edinburgh); 29 May 2020 (United States)
- Running time: 96 minutes
- Countries: Iceland; Ireland; United States
- Language: English

End of Sentence is a 2019 drama film starring John Hawkes, Logan Lerman and Sarah Bolger and directed by Elfar Adalsteins. Upon its release, the movie received critical acclaim.

== Plot ==
Frank Fogle, a widower, reluctantly embarks on a journey to honour his wife's last wish of spreading her ashes in a remote lake in her native Ireland and a promise of taking his estranged son, Sean, along for the trip. As Sean steps out of prison the last thing on his mind is a foreign road trip with his alienated father. What he needs is a fresh start in the United States. But when his travel plans collapse he reluctantly accepts his father's proposal in return for a ticket to the West Coast and a promise that they never have to see each other again. Between a disconcerting Irish wake, the surfacing of an old flame, the pick up of a pretty hitchhiker and plenty of unresolved issues, the journey becomes a little more than father and son had bargained for.

== Cast ==
- John Hawkes as Frank Fogle
- Logan Lerman as Sean Fogle
- Sarah Bolger as Jewel
- Ólafur Darri Ólafsson as Stone
- Denis Conway as Father Tobin
- Lalor Roddy as Murphy
- Sean Mahon as Andrew

== Production ==
The film was shot in Ireland in May 2017.

== Reception ==
On the review aggregator website Rotten Tomatoes, 92% of 71 critics' reviews are positive, with an average rating of 7/10. The website's consensus reads: "Steered by a pair of powerful lead performances, End of Sentence is a road trip movie that takes audiences on a satisfying emotional journey." Metacritic, which uses a weighted average, assigned the film a score of 74 out of 100, based on eight critics, indicating "generally favorable" reviews.
