= Kristján Þorvaldsson =

Icelandic editor (1962–2023)

- Born: 4 May 1962; Fáskrúðsfjörður, Iceland
- Died: 6 August 2023 (aged 61); Lolland, Denmark
- Occupation(s): Newspaper editor, journalist

Kristján Þorvaldsson (4 May 1962 – 6 August 2023) was an Icelandic editor and journalist.

== Early life ==
Kristján Þorvaldsson was born in Fáskrúðsfjörður. He was the youngest of four siblings, the son of Þorvaldur Jónsson and Oddný Aðalbjörg Jónsdóttir. He grew up in Fáskrúðsfjörður until he moved to Reykjavík to study at Menntaskólinn við Sund.

== Career ==
Þorvaldsson worked in the media for most of his career, mostly in print media. He started his career at Alþýðublaðið and worked there for several years. He worked for a while at Morgunblaðið and Vikan and later was editor of Pressan for a while as well as Mannlíf. He worked for a while as a radio host on Rás 2 and for several years hosted the radio show Sunnudagskaffi. In 1996 he was one of the founders of the magazine Séð og heyrt, and was its editor for ten years.

== Personal life and death ==
Þorvaldsson was the father of actor Þorvaldur Davíð Kristjánsson. Kristján Þorvaldsson died on 6 August 2023, at the age of 61.
