= The Minister (TV series) =

2020 Icelandic drama TV series

- Genre: Drama
- Directed by: Arnór Pálmi Arnarson; Nanna Kristín Magnúsdóttir
- Starring: Ólafur Darri Ólafsson; Anita Briem; Þuríður Blær Jóhannsdóttir; Þorvaldur Davíð Kristjánsson; Sigurður Sigurjónsson; Jóhann Sigurðarson
- Country of origin: Iceland
- Original language: Icelandic
- No. of seasons: 2
- No. of episodes: 16

Production
- Executive producers: Þórhallur Gunnarsson; Hilmar Sigurðsson; Ólafur Darri Ólafsson; Kjartan Þór Þórðarson
- Producer: Anna Vigdís Gísladóttir
- Cinematography: Ásgrímur Guðbjartsson
- Production company: Sagafilm

Original release
- Network: RÚV
- Release: 20 September 2020 – 13 October 2024

The Minister (Icelandic: Ráðherrann) is an Icelandic television drama series developed by Sagafilm. It debuted as an eight-part series that follows populist Prime Minister Benedikt Ríkarðsson (Ólafur Darri Ólafsson) as his mental illness grows and his colleagues try to keep it a secret from the nation. In 2023 it was renewed for a second season.
