= Óskar Þór Axelsson =

Icelandic film director and screenwriter

- Born: 28 June 1973 (age 53); Reykjavík, Iceland
- Education: University of Iceland; NYU
- Occupations: film director; screenwriter
- Known for: Black's Game; I Remember You
- Website: oskarthoraxelsson.com

Óskar Þór Axelsson (born 28 June 1973) is an Icelandic film director and screenwriter. He is best known for the 2012 crime film Black's Game and the 2017 mystery-horror I Remember You.

== Early life and education ==
Óskar was born and raised in Reykjavík, Iceland. He completed his Bachelor of Arts degree in general literature at the University of Iceland in 1997 and then spent one year in the ERASMUS exchange program at the University College London. He graduated with a Master of Fine Arts degree in Filmmaking from New York University in 2006.

== Career ==
Óskar's first full-length film was Black's Game (2012), based on the novel of the same name by Stefán Máni. In the 2013 Edda Awards, Óskar won Screenplay of the Year (Handrit ársins) for the film, and it became the second highest grossing Icelandic film of all time. A prequel to Black's Game was due for release in 2024, and a sequel in 2025.

Óskar's second film was I Remember You (2017), based on a novel of the same name by Yrsa Sigurðardóttir. It was the most watched and the highest grossing film in Iceland in 2017.

Óskar has also directed the TV series Stella Blómkvist, and five episodes of the TV series Trapped.

== Filmography ==
- Nylon (2004) (Short)
- Traveler (2005) (Short)
- Misty Mountain (2006) (Short)
- Black's Game (Svartur á leik) (2012)
- I Remember You (Ég man þig) (2017)
- Operation Napoleon
