= Black's Game =

2012 Icelandic film

- Film poster
- Icelandic: Svartur á leik
- Directed by: Óskar Þór Axelsson
- Screenplay by: Óskar Þór Axelsson
- Based on: Svartur á leik by Stefán Máni
- Produced by: Þórir Snær Sigurjónsson; Skúli Malmquist; Arnar Knútsson
- Starring: Þorvaldur Davíð Kristjánsson; Jóhannes Haukur Jóhannesson; Damon Younger; María Birta Bjarnadóttir
- Cinematography: Bergsteinn Björgúlfsson
- Edited by: Kristján Loðmfjörð
- Music by: Frank Hall
- Production companies: Zik Zak Filmworks; Filmus
- Distributed by: Sena
- Release dates: 1 February 2012 (Rotterdam); 2 March 2012 (Iceland)
- Running time: 104 minutes
- Country: Iceland
- Language: Icelandic
- Budget: 150000000 ISK

Black's Game (Icelandic: Svartur á leik) is an Icelandic crime film from 2012, directed and written by Óskar Þór Axelsson. It is based on the novel of the same name by Stefán Máni about the drug trade in Reykjavík in the mid-1990s.

In the 2013 Edda Awards, Óskar Þór Axelsson won Screenplay of the Year (Handrit ársins), Damon Younger won Best Supporting Actor (Leikari í aukahlutverki) and María Birta Bjarnadóttir won Best Supporting Actress (Leikkona í aukahlutverki) for the film. It became the second highest grossing Icelandic film of all time. A prequel to Black's Game was due for release in 2024, and a sequel in 2025.

== Plot ==
Black's Game takes place during the uncertain times of the mid-nineties, when Reykjavík's underworld is expanding and becoming more dangerous. The audience follows the rise and fall of a cast of characters; Stebbi, an ordinary man who gets involved in the drug world through his childhood friend, Tóti. Tóti works for Jói Faraó, the country's biggest drug baron since the 1970s. Tóti together with Brúnó take over Jói's business and change the drug market. At the beginning of the film, Stebbi is facing charges for a fight he got into when he was drunk. He comes across Tóta, who offers him the best criminal lawyer in the country if he comes to work for him. A little later, when Brúnó returns from his self-imposed one-year exile abroad, Stebbi sees that there is a lot of tension under the surface. Brúnó is amoral and thrives on danger and crime. Tóti, on the other hand, is in touch with reality and only wants to run a profitable company. An internal conflict begins with Stebbi is stuck in the middle. The story is told from Stebbi's point of view, and the first half of the film goes back and forth between Stebbi, who is learning the ropes and becoming a member of the gang with decent prospects, and Tóti's backstory and the beginnings of the gang. In the second half, Brúnó has returned and the gang has begun to break up. It ends with Stebbi finding himself stuck between Tóti and Brúnó.

== Cast ==
- Þorvaldur Davíð Kristjánsson as Stebbi Psycho
- Jóhannes Haukur Jóhannesson as Tóti
- Damon Younger as Brúnó
- María Birta Bjarnadóttir as Dagný
- Vignir Rafn Valþórsson as Robbi Rotta
- Egill Einarsson as Sævar K
- Björn Jörundur Friðbjörnsson as Óskar Tattoo
- Ísak Hinriksson as Nóri litli
- Andri Már Birgisson as Rósi
- Þór Jóhannesson as Eddi Krueger
- Rúnar Freyr Gíslason as Árni Jónsson
- Hilmar Jónsson as Konráð Geirsson
- Þröstur Leó Gunnarsson as Jói Faraó
- Steinn Ármann Magnússon as Einar Skakki
- Sveinn Geirsson as Viktor

== Production ==
In 2005, the film companies Zik Zak Filmworks and Filmus bought the film rights to the book and employed Stefán Mána to write the screenplay. However, Oskar Þór Axelsson later took over the job of screenwriter and in 2008 was chosen as the film's director. Black's Game took over seven years to produce and financing proved difficult. Andri Sveinsson and Heiðar Guðjónsson were the main investors in the film, but it also received a 64000000 ISK grant from the Icelandic Film Fund. At the beginning of 2009, and auditions were announced for the students of the Iceland Academy of Arts. In preparation for his role in the film, Jóhannes Haukur Jóhannesson hired a personal trainer and started exercising six times a week. Þorvaldur Davíð Kristjánsson was chosen for the role of Stebbi, but Stefán Máni, the author of the book, said that he had always envisioned him as the character.
