= Blank (2022 film) =

British film by Natalie Kennedy

- Theatrical release poster
- Directed by: Natalie Kennedy
- Written by: Stephen Herman
- Produced by: Rebecca-Clare Evans
- Starring: Rachel Shelley; Heida Reed; Wayne Brady; Annie Cusselle; Rebecca-Clare Evans
- Cinematography: James Oldham
- Edited by: Tamsin Jeffrey; Andrew McKee
- Music by: Arhynn Descy
- Production companies: Kenmor Films; Templeheart Films; Caged Film; EnMar Productions
- Distributed by: Sparky Pictures
- Release dates: 15 March 2022 (Manchester Film Festival); 3 November 2023 (United Kingdom)
- Running time: 95 minutes
- Country: United Kingdom
- Language: English

Blank is a 2022 British science fiction thriller film directed by Natalie Kennedy and written by Stephen Herman. It stars Rachel Shelley, Heida Reed, Wayne Brady, Annie Cusselle, Rebecca-Clare Evans, and Bhasker Patel.

== Plot ==
Claire Rivers is a desperate writer struggling with writer's block, so she travels to a fully enclosed rural compound for a retreat that is fully controlled by A.I. However, a glitch turns the whole residence into a torturous prison.

Malware locks Claire in her cabin, leaving her assigned android assistant Rita as the only one capable of unlocking the door. However, the same malware also causes Rita to misinterpret her programming, and she refuses to allow Claire to leave until Claire finishes writing her book.

Claire struggles to write her book, an autobiographical drama about her own childhood, in which she was raised by an abusive mother.

Meanwhile, Claire slowly grows more and more desperate to leave the cabin, but all of her attempts to escape or reason with the increasingly malfunctioning Rita fail.

The climax of the book, in which Claire kills her mother in self defense, is intercut with the climax of the frame story, in which Claire has a physical confrontation with Rita in a final attempt to escape.

In the denouement, we learn why Claire had such a difficult time writing the new book: She’s actually never written a book before; all of her previous novels had actually been written by her mother, which Claire claimed as her own after her mother’s death.

Wayne Brady has a supporting role as Claire’s holographic assistant.

== Cast ==
- Rachel Shelley as Claire Rivers
- Heida Reed as Rita
- Wayne Brady as Henry
- Annie Cusselle as Young Claire
- Rebecca-Clare Evans as Helen Rivers
- Bhasker Patel as Dr. Varma

== Release ==
Blank premiered at the Manchester Film Festival on 15 March 2022. It was released in the United Kingdom on 3 November 2023.

== Reception ==
Common Sense Media gave the film a score of four out of five and wrote it was a "compelling new cinematic prison that's well worth spending time in." Phil Hoad from The Guardian gave a score of three out of five and wrote, "With some flashes of inspired direction, like an upwards through-the-typewriter shot, this hybrid of fastidious huis clos thriller and trauma drama at least has an in-progress human energy and scope".
