= Já-fólkið =

2020 short film

Yes-People
- Official release poster
- Directed by: Gísli Darri Halldórsson
- Screenplay by: Gísli Darri Halldórsson
- Produced by: Arnar Gunnarsson; Gísli Darri Halldórsson
- Production company: CAOZ
- Release dates: 2020 (festivals); March 16, 2021
- Running time: 8 minutes
- Country: Iceland
- Language: Icelandic

Já-fólkið (Yes-People) is a 2020 Icelandic animated short film written, directed and co-produced by Gísli Darri Halldórsson, and produced & animated by CAOZ in Reykjavík.

== Summary ==
A diverse group of individuals , each confront their personal battles one morning.

== Voice cast ==
- Jón Gnarr
- Thor Kristjansson
- Helga Braga Jónsdóttir
- Kristján Franklin Magnúss
- Ilmur Kristjánsdóttir
- Sigurður Sigurjónsson

== Accolades ==
Yes-People was nominated for Best Animated Short Film and the 93rd Academy Awards.
