= Heida Reed =

Icelandic actress and model (born 1987)

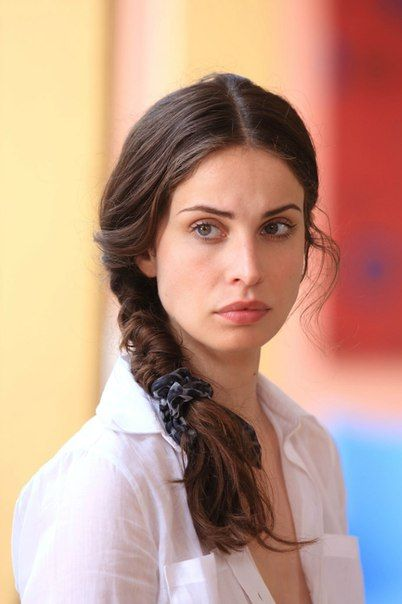
- Reed in 2021
- Born: Heiða Rún Sigurðardóttir; 22 May 1987 (age 39); Reykjavík, Iceland
- Education: Drama Centre London
- Occupations: Actress; model
- Years active: 2008–present
- Spouse: Sam Ritzenberg (m. 2018)

Heiða Rún Sigurðardóttir (HAY-da; born 22 May 1987), known professionally as Heida Reed, is an Icelandic actress and model. She is known for playing parts in One Day (2011), Jo (2013), Silent Witness (2014), the BBC drama Poldark (2015–2019) and the CBS drama FBI: International (2021–2024).

== Early and personal life ==
Reed was born in Iceland, the middle of three children of a music teacher father and a dental hygienist mother. She grew up in Breiðholt, Reykjavík, and attended Ölduselsskóli. Aged 18, she was recruited by an Icelandic modeling agency, and moved to Mumbai to work as a model in India for two years. When she was 19/20, she settled in London, where she studied drama at Drama Centre London, graduating in 2010.

As of July 2017, Reed announced through social media that she is engaged to her boyfriend, America-based producer Sam Ritzenberg.

== Acting career ==
Reed's first performance was in 2009 in an Edinburgh Fringe production of Camus's Cross Purpose. A reviewer for the Edinburgh Guide considered it "expertly acted and finely paced." In April 2015, Reed co-starred in the world premiere of a new play, Scarlet, by Sam H Freeman at Southwark Playhouse exploring slut-shaming and cyberbullying and their emotional repercussions.

The same year, Reed was cast in a major role in the British historical TV drama Poldark, which was based on the novels of the same title, playing the part of Elizabeth. She appeared in all five seasons of the series.

In 2018, she appeared on the West End in Foxfinder with Iwan Rheon.

In 2021, Reed began portraying FBI Special Agent Jamie Kellett in CBS crime drama series FBI: International. In December 2023, it was announced that she would be leaving the series with her character being written off in the first episode of the third season that aired in February 2024.

She played the part of Professor Jocelyn Peabody in the B7 Media Audio adaptations of some of the Dan Dare stories, which have been broadcast on BBC Radio 4 Extra a number of times, most recently in 2022.

== Filmography ==
=== Films ===
Year	Title	Role	Notes
2010	Dance Like Someone's Watching	Gabriella	Short film
2011	One Day	Ingrid	
2012	Vampyre Nation	Celeste	
2013	Eternal Return	Isabelle	
2022	Against the Ice	Naja	
2022	Blank	Rita	
2022	Summerlight… and Then Comes the Night	Elísabet	

=== TV Series ===
Year	Title	Role	Notes
2012	DCI Banks	Carmen	2 episodes
2013	Jo	Adèle Gauthier	Main role
2014	Silent Witness	Monica Dreyfus	Episode: "Commodity" (2 parts)
2014	The Lava Field (Hraunið)	Gréta	TV miniseries
2015–2019	Poldark	Elizabeth Poldark (nee Chynoweth)	Main cast (Seasons 1-4) 35 episodes Season 5 (in flashbacks & hallucinations)
2015	Toast of London	Pooky Hook	Episode: "Hamm on Toast"
2016	Death in Paradise	Eloise Ronson	Episode: "Posing in Murder"
2017–2021	Stella Blómkvist	Stella Blómkvist	Main role
2021–2024	FBI: International	Special Agent Jamie Kellett	Main cast
2023	FBI	Special Agent Jamie Kellett	Guest star

=== Web series ===
Year	Title	Role	Notes
2018	Nutritiously Nicola!	Olivia Reedy	Episode: "Food instability"

=== Theatre ===
Year	Title	Playwright	Role	Venue	Notes
2009	Cross Purpose	Albert Camus	Maria	Edinburgh Festival Fringe C Venues	Find a Penny Theatre Company
2009	Macbeth	William Shakespeare	The Doctor	Unknown	Shakespeare in Styria
2011	Top Girls	Caryl Churchill	Marlene understudy	Trafalgar Studios	
2015	Scarlet	Sam H. Freeman	Scarlet	Southwark Playhouse	Role shared with Lucy Kilpatrick, Jade Ogugua and Asha Reid in unison
2018	Foxfinder	Dawn King	Judith Covey	Ambassadors Theatre	
