= The Love That Remains =

2025 film by Hlynur Pálmason

- Icelandic theatrical release poster
- Icelandic: Ástin Sem Eftir Er
- Directed by: Hlynur Pálmason
- Screenplay by: Hlynur Pálmason
- Produced by: Rémi Burah; Katrin Pors; Anton Máni Svansson
- Starring: Saga Garðarsdóttir; Sverrir Gudnason; Ída Mekkín Hlynsdóttir; Þorgils Hlynsson; Grímur Hlynsson
- Cinematography: Hlynur Pálmason
- Edited by: Julius Krebs Damsbo
- Music by: Harry Hunt
- Production companies: STILL VIVID; Snowglobe; Aamu Film Company; HOBAB; Film i Väst; Arte France Cinéma
- Release dates: 18 May 2025 (Cannes); 14 August 2025 (Iceland)
- Running time: 109 minutes
- Countries: Iceland; Denmark; France; Finland; Sweden
- Language: Icelandic
- Box office: $397,881

The Love That Remains (Icelandic: Ástin Sem Eftir Er) is a 2025 comedy-drama written and directed by Hlynur Pálmason. Starring Saga Garðarsdóttir and Sverrir Guðnason, it follows a year in the life of an Icelandic family as the parents separate.

The film had its world premiere in the Cannes Premiere section of the 2025 Cannes Film Festival on 18 May, where the lead animal actor, Panda, won the Palm Dog Award. It was theatrically released in Iceland on 14 August.

It was selected as the Icelandic entry for Best International Feature Film at the 98th Academy Awards, but it was not nominated.

== Premise ==
It is described as a family drama exploring a year in the life of a family as the parents separate.

== Cast ==
- Saga Garðarsdóttir as Anna
- Sverrir Guðnason as Magnús
- Ída Mekkín Hlynsdóttir as Ída
- Þorgils Hlynsson as Þorgils
- Grímur Hlynsson as Grímur
- Kristinn Guðmundsson as Ágúst
- Halldór Laxness Halldórsson as Daníel
- Anders Mossling as Martin
- Ingvar E. Sigurðsson as Pálmi
- Katla M. Þorgeirsdóttir as Íris

== Production ==
It is produced by Anton Máni Svansson of Iceland’s STILL VIVID and Katrin Pors of Denmark’s Snowglobe.

Principal photography took place in Iceland in 2024. Palmason also served as cinematographer, shooting in 35 mm film. It features his regular collaborators such as editor Julius Krebs Damsbo, sound designer Björn Viktorsson and production designer Frosti Friðriksson. The soundtrack features original music by Harry Hunt.

== Release ==
The Love That Remains had its North American premiere at the 50th Toronto International Film Festival on 4 September 2025. It was also selected for the Main Slate of the 63rd New York Film Festival.

== Reception ==
On the review aggregator website Rotten Tomatoes, 94% of 54 critics' reviews are positive.

=== Accolades ===
Award	Year	Category	Recipient(s)	Result	Ref.
Cannes Film Festival	2025	Palm Dog Award	Panda	Won	
Film Fest Gent	2025	Special Mention	The Love That Remains	Won	

== See also ==
- List of submissions to the 98th Academy Awards for Best International Feature Film
- List of Icelandic submissions for the Academy Award for Best International Feature Film
