= The Darkness (TV series) =

Nordic noir television series

- Genre: Nordic noir
- Based on: The Darkness by Ragnar Jónasson
- Written by: Sam Shore, Kacie Stetson, Hannah Marshall, Óttar Nordfjord
- Directed by: Lasse Hallström
- Starring: Lena Olin
- Countries of origin: United States; Iceland
- Original language: English
- No. of series: 1
- No. of episodes: 6

Production
- Executive producers: Ragnar Jónasson; Greg Silverman; John-Paul Sarni; Kristinn Thordarson; Leifur B. Dagfinnsson; Samuel E Shore
- Production companies: CBS Studios; Truenorth; Stampede Ventures

Original release
- Network: SkyShowtime
- Release: 11 September 2024 (Iceland)

The Darkness is a 2024 Nordic noir television series. The Icelandic / American co-production is based on the Ragnar Jónasson novel of the same name. It is directed by Lasse Hallström and stars Lena Olin.

== Plot ==
Detective Inspector Hulda Hermannsdóttir is given a shocking new murder case, on the cusp of early retirement. Some hikers have discovered the frozen body of a young woman in a glacier. Her new partner assigned to the case, Lukas, has recently arrived from England.

Hermannsdóttir is haunted by the suicide of her daughter a year previously, which has also caused tensions in her marriage to Jon, as she is unable or unwilling to talk about it. There is also reference to her own childhood trauma. Her neighbour, Petur, is a widower whose dog regularly wanders over to her house, and she strikes up a friendship with him.

== Cast ==
- Lena Olin as Detective Inspector Hulda Hermannsdóttir
- Jack Bannon as Lukas, Hermannsdóttir new partner
- Douglas Henshall as Petur, Hermannsdóttir's neighbour
- Þorsteinn Bachmann as Jon, Hermannsdóttir's husband
- Björn Hlynur Haraldsson as Magnus
- Þorvaldur Davíð Kristjánsson
- Tora Hallström as Alexander
- Ahd Tamimi
- Árni Þór Lárusson
- Eva Dögg Atladóttir
- Hrafnhildur Ingadóttir as Naomi
- Olafur Darri Olafsson as Aki

== Production ==
=== Development ===
A prospective series adaptation of the book series by Icelandic author Ragnar Jónasson from CBS Studios and Truenorth was in development in September 2020.

An English-language six-episode series adaptation of the thriller series of books by Ragnar Jonasson was announced in October 2023, with Lasse Hallstrom as director and Lena Olin as Detective Inspector Hulda Hermannsdóttir. It is produced by CBS Studios and Truenorth and executive produced by Stampede Ventures.

The Darkness is written by Sam Shore, with he and Jónasson serving as executive producers, with Greg Silverman and John-Paul Sarni executive producers for Stampede Ventures and Kristinn Thordarson and Leifur B. Dagfinnsson executive producers for Truenorth.

=== Casting ===
In January 2024, Jack Bannon, Douglas Henshall, and Björn Hlynur Haraldsson joined the cast.

=== Filming ===
Filming locations include Reykjavík. Principal photography began in January 2024.

== Broadcast ==
The Darkness premiered in Iceland on 12 September 2024.

The series was broadcast on SBS Television in Australia from 9 January 2025, with all episodes available on its streaming service SBS on Demand on the same date.

== Reception ==
Anthony Morris of SBS Television praised Olin's performance as Detective Hulda Hermannsdóttir, saying that it "might be her most impressive role to date".
