= Jóhannes Haukur Jóhannesson =

Icelandic actor (born 1980)

- Born: 26 February 1980 (age 46); Hafnarfjörður, Iceland
- Occupation: Actor
- Years active: 2002–present

Jóhannes Haukur Jóhannesson (born 26 February 1980) is an Icelandic actor known for his roles in the TV series Game of Thrones (2016), Vikings: Valhalla (2022) and Succession (2023), and in the films Atomic Blonde (2017) and Alpha (2018).

== Filmography ==
=== Film ===
Year	Title	Role	Notes
2008	Reykjavík-Rotterdam	Eiríkur	
2009	Bjarnfreðarson	Guffi	
2012	Black's Game	Tóti	
2014	Noah	Cain	Uncredited
2016	The Aquatic Effect	Ólafur	
2017	Atomic Blonde	Yuri Bakhtin	
2017	I Remember You	Freyr	
2018	Alpha	Tau	
2018	The Sisters Brothers	Head Trapper	
2019	Where'd You Go, Bernadette	Captain J. Rouverol	
2019	The Good Liar	Vlad	
2020	Bloodshot	Nick Baris	
2020	Eurovision Song Contest: The Story of Fire Saga	Johans	
2021	Zone 414	Mr. Russell	
2021	Infinite	Kovic	
2024	Duino	Gunner	
2025	Captain America: Brave New World	Davis Lawfers / Copperhead	
2026	Masters of the Universe	Malcolm / Fisto	
2026	The Brink of War	Richard Perle	
TBA	The Boy in the Iron Box		Post-production

=== Television ===
Year	Title	Role	Notes
2008	Svartir Englar	Steinar Ísfeld	3 episodes
2008–2013	Áramótaskaup	Már / Geir Haarde / Various	5 episodes
2009	Fangavaktin	Guffi	Episode #1.7
2009–2010	Réttur	Magnús	8 episodes
2011	Pressa	Högni	5 episodes
2013	LazyTown	Chef Pablo Fantastico	Episode: "Chef Rottenfood"
2013	Journey's End	Egil Skallagrimsson	2 episodes
2013	A.D. The Bible Continues	Thomas the Apostle	9 episodes
2016	Game of Thrones	Lem Lemoncloak	2 episodes
2016	Der Island-Krimi	Leifur	Episode: "Der Tote im Westfjord"
2017	The Last Kingdom	Sverri	2 episodes
2017	Loforð	Róbert	4 episodes
2017, 2021	Stella Blómkvist	Sverrir	8 episodes
2018	The Innocents	Steinar	Main
2018	Origin	Eric Carlson/Vincent Jonsson	Recurring
2019	Beforeigners	Kalv / Asatru-Missionary	4 episodes
2020	Cursed	Cumber, the Ice King	Recurring
2020	The Letter for the King	Bors	Guest starring
2022–2023	Vikings: Valhalla	Olaf "the Holy" Haraldsson	Main
2023	Succession	Oskar Guðjohnsen	Guest starring
2023	The Witcher	Crach an Craite	Guest starring
2024	Those About to Die	Viggo	10 episodes
2025	Miss Fallaci	Orson Welles	8 episodes
