= Ragnar Jónasson =

Icelandic crime fiction writer (born 1976)

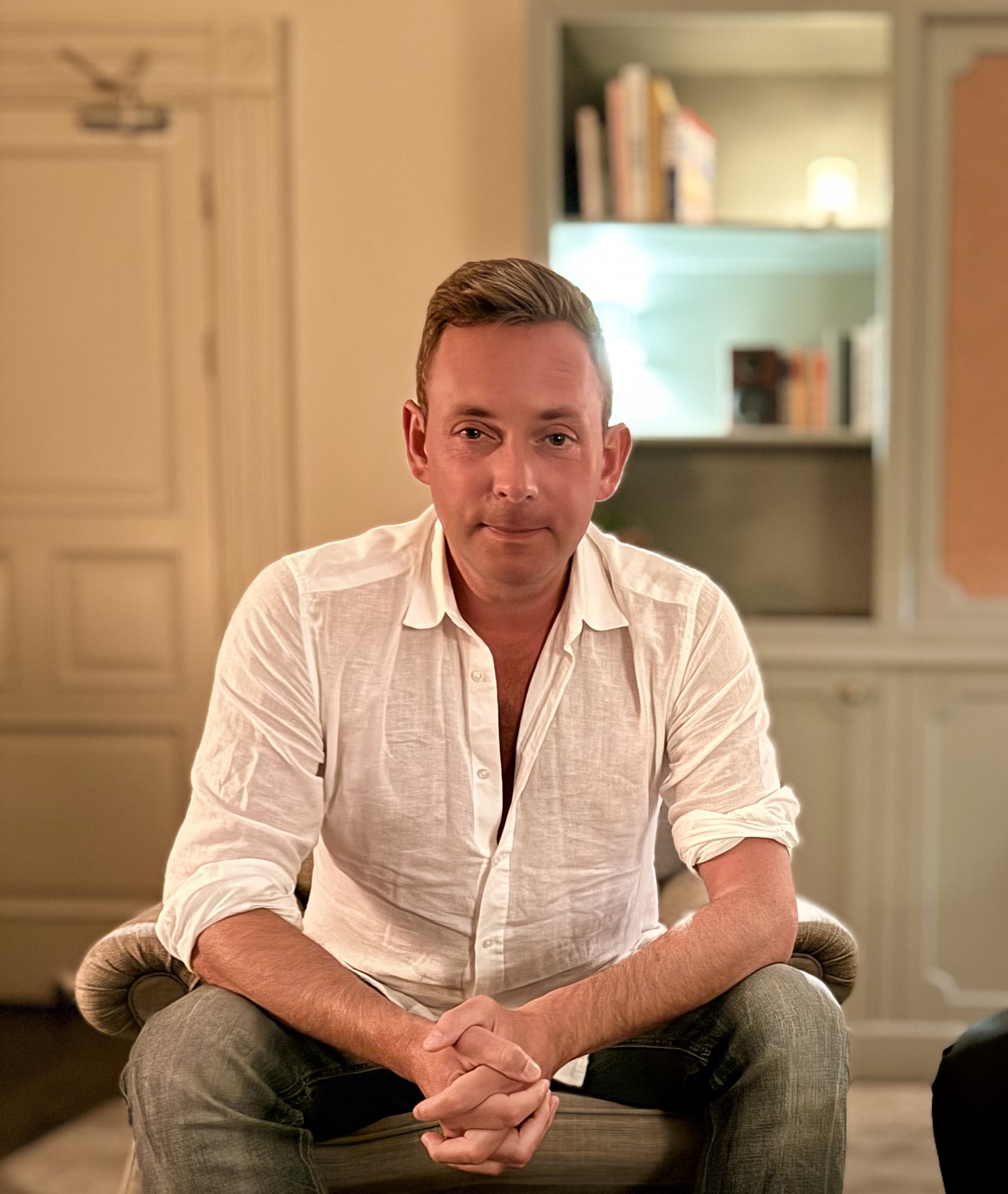
- Born: 20 July 1976 (age 50); Reykjavík, Iceland
- Occupations: Novelist, lawyer, translator
- Writing career
- Language: Icelandic
- Genre: Crime fiction
- Notable works: Snowblind; The Darkness; Reykjavík (with Katrín Jakobsdóttir)
- Website: ragnarjonasson.com

Ragnar Jónasson (born 20 July 1976) is an Icelandic author of crime fiction, best known for the Dark Iceland series featuring police officer Ari Þór Arason, set in the northern town of Siglufjörður, and the Hulda trilogy featuring Reykjavík detective Hulda Hermannsdóttir. His books have sold several million copies and been published in around 40 countries. In 2022 he co-wrote the novel Reykjavík with Katrín Jakobsdóttir, then the Prime Minister of Iceland, followed by a sequel, Franski spítalinn, in 2025. He is a co-founder of the Reykjavík literary festival Iceland Noir.

== Early life and career ==
Jónasson was born in Reykjavík on 20 July 1976. His father's family came from Siglufjörður, a fishing town in northern Iceland which he visited regularly in his childhood and which later became the setting of his Dark Iceland novels; his grandfather wrote a history of the town.

A reader of Agatha Christie from childhood, Jónasson began translating her work into Icelandic as a teenager, at seventeen, and has translated fourteen of her novels; the immersion in Christie's plotting is frequently cited as a formative influence on his own writing. His short stories have appeared in Ellery Queen's Mystery Magazine, the first by an Icelandic author in that publication. Trained as a lawyer, he has taught copyright law at Reykjavík University and worked in investment banking; he previously worked in radio and television, including as a news reporter for the Icelandic national broadcaster RÚV.

== Writing career ==
=== Dark Iceland series ===
Jónasson's debut novel, Fölsk nóta, was published in Iceland in 2009. He followed it with Snjóblinda (2010), the first of the Dark Iceland series, set in Siglufjörður and featuring the young policeman Ari Þór Arason. His international breakthrough came after he was taken on by the literary agency that had represented Henning Mankell, which sold the series widely abroad. The English translation, Snowblind (2015), reached number one in the Amazon Kindle chart in the United Kingdom, was described by The New York Times as a "classically crafted whodunit", and was named by The Independent among the best crime novels of 2015. Nightblind won the 2016 Dead Good Reader Award for Most Captivating Crime in Translation. In 2020 he became the first Icelandic author to hold two books simultaneously in the top places of the German bestseller list, when Dimma reached second place and Drungi fourth; at that point his books had sold around 1.5 million copies worldwide.

=== Hulda Hermannsdóttir series ===
The Hulda trilogy – The Darkness (Dimma), The Island (Drungi) and The Mist (Mistur) – features Hulda Hermannsdóttir, a Reykjavík detective on the verge of retirement, and is told in reverse chronological order. Drungi was nominated for the Icelandic crime fiction award Blóðdropinn in 2016.. In 2024, Hulda was published, which is a prequel to the series.

=== Helgi Reykdal series ===
The Helgi series - Death at the Sanatorium (Hvítidauði), The Mysterious Case of the Missing Crime Writer (Hvítalogn), and The Body in the Bath (Svartakóf) centers on Helgi Reykdal, a young detective of the Rekjiavík police, who solves current and cold cases, and contains references into the Hulda series. The Mysterious Case of the Missing Crime Writer concerns the disappearance of a celebrated crime novelist and was named by a critic in The Times among the best crime novels published in Britain that year.

=== Collaborations with Katrín Jakobsdóttir ===
In October 2022 Jónasson published Reykjavík, co-written with Katrín Jakobsdóttir, then Prime Minister of Iceland, who wrote her master's thesis on Icelandic crime fiction; the collaboration, largely completed during the COVID-19 pandemic, was launched at Iðnó in Reykjavík and drew international press attention. The mystery, set around the disappearance of a teenage girl in 1956 and a journalist's investigation during Reykjavík's bicentenary in 1986, became the best-selling book of the year 2022 in Iceland and was nominated for Blóðdropinn. It was published in English in 2023 by Minotaur Books as Reykjavík: A Crime Story and was named among the best crime novels of 2023 by The New York Times and Kirkus Reviews.

In 2025 the pair published a second novel, Franski spítalinn (The French Hospital), a sequel to Reykjavík set in East Iceland in February 1989, in which a man is found dead in the historic French Hospital in Fáskrúðsfjörður and a Morgunblaðið journalist investigates.

=== Standalones ===
His later standalone novels include The Girl Who Died (Þorpið), and Outside (Úti) The Girl Who Died was named one of the five best crime novels of the year by The Sunday Times in 2021, and its publisher reported it as the first Icelandic book to reach the top ten of the Sunday Times bestseller list. In October 2025 he published Emilía, a ghost-story novella and a departure from his crime fiction.

== Adaptations ==
In 2020 it was announced that CBS Studios and Stampede Ventures would produce an eight-episode television series based on The Darkness (Dimma), to be filmed in Iceland. The adaptation, produced by CBS Studios, directed by Lasse Hallström and starring Lena Olin as Hulda, was filmed in Reykjavík in 2024, with Jónasson serving as an executive producer and spending time on set during filming. His novel Outside is in development as a feature film by Ridley Scott's production company Scott Free Productions.

== Iceland Noir and other activities ==
In 2013 Jónasson co-founded the Reykjavík crime fiction festival Iceland Noir with Yrsa Sigurðardóttir and Quentin Bates; the festival has since grown into a broader annual literary festival. Together with Sigurðardóttir he also established the Svartfuglinn (Blackbird) award for the best debut crime novel by an Icelandic writer. He set up the first overseas chapter of the British Crime Writers' Association in Reykjavík. As of 2025 he is vice-chair of the Writers' Union of Iceland and sits on the board of the Iceland Symphony Orchestra, alongside his work as a special advisor at the Icelandic legal firm LOGOS.

== Translations ==
Starting at the age of 17, Jónasson translated fourteen of Agatha Christie's novels and one of her short-story collections into Icelandic. Among his translations is Death on the Nile, which had not previously been published in Icelandic.

- 1994 Sígaunajörðin (Endless Night), Skjaldborg, Reykjavík.
- 1995 Morð í þremur þáttum (Three Act Tragedy), Skjaldborg, Reykjavík.
- 1996 Höfðingjahótelið (The Body in the Library), Skjaldborg, Reykjavík.
- 1997 Morð um borð (Death in the Clouds), Skjaldborg, Reykjavík.
- 1998 Feigðarför (Appointment with Death), Skjaldborg, Reykjavík.
- 1999 Tönn fyrir tönn (One, Two, Buckle My Shoe), Skjaldborg, Reykjavík.
- 2000 Dauðinn á Níl (Death on the Nile), Skjaldborg, Reykjavík.
- 2001 Brögð í tafli (They Do It with Mirrors), Skjaldborg, Reykjavík.
- 2003 Á síðustu stundu (Mrs McGinty's Dead), Skjaldborg, Reykjavík.
- 2004 Lávarður deyr (Lord Edgware Dies), Skjaldborg, Reykjavík.
- 2005 Þögult vitni (Dumb Witness), Skjaldborg, Reykjavík.
- 2006 Flóð og fjara (Taken at the Flood), Skjaldborg, Reykjavík.
- 2007 Ráðgátan um jólabúðinginn og fleiri sögur (The Adventure of the Christmas Pudding, short stories), Ugla, Reykjavík.
- 2008 Spilin á borðið (Cards on the Table), Ugla, Reykjavík.
- 2009 Minning um morð (Five Little Pigs), Ugla, Reykjavík.

== Personal life ==
Jónasson lives in Reykjavík and has two daughters.

== Bibliography ==
Works within a series are listed in the order of the original Icelandic publications.

=== Dark Iceland series ===
- 2009 Fölsk nóta (prequel to the Dark Iceland series; not yet translated into English)
- 2010 Snjóblinda
  - Snowblind (translated by Quentin Bates), Orenda Books, London 2015, ISBN 978-1-910633-03-8.
- 2011 Myrknætti
  - Blackout (translated by Quentin Bates), Orenda Books, London 2016, ISBN 978-1-910633-46-5.
- 2012 Rof
  - Rupture (translated by Quentin Bates), Orenda Books, London 2017, ISBN 978-1-910633-57-1.
- 2013 Andköf
  - Whiteout (translated by Quentin Bates), Orenda Books, London 2017, ISBN 978-1-910633-89-2.
- 2014 Náttblinda
  - Nightblind (translated by Quentin Bates), Orenda Books, London 2016, ISBN 978-1-910633-11-3.
- 2020 Vetrarmein
  - Winterkill (translated by David Warriner), Orenda Books, London 2020, ISBN 978-1-913193-46-1.
- 2025 Fadeout (prequel novella; no Icelandic edition), in: Snowblind (10th anniversary edition), Orenda Books, London 2025, ISBN 978-1-916788-94-7.

=== Hulda Hermannsdóttir series ===
- 2015 Dimma
  - The Darkness (translated by Victoria Cribb), Michael Joseph, London 2018, ISBN 978-0-7181-8724-8.
- 2016 Drungi
  - The Island (translated by Victoria Cribb), Michael Joseph, London 2019, ISBN 978-0-7181-8725-5.
- 2017 Mistur
  - The Mist (translated by Victoria Cribb), Michael Joseph, London 2020, ISBN 978-0-7181-8907-5.
- 2024 Hulda (prequel to the Hulda trilogy)
  - The Valley (translated by Philip Roughton; announced for 13 May 2027), Michael Joseph, London 2027, ISBN 978-0-241-78640-6.

=== Helgi Reykdal series ===
- 2019 Hvítidauði
  - Death at the Sanatorium (translated by Victoria Cribb), Michael Joseph, London 2024, ISBN 978-0-241-49363-2.
- 2023 Hvítalogn
  - The Mysterious Case of the Missing Crime Writer (translated by Victoria Cribb), Michael Joseph, London 2025, ISBN 978-0-241-71110-1.
- 2026 Svartakóf
  - The Body in the Bath (translated by Philip Roughton), Michael Joseph, London 2026, ISBN 978-0-241-78638-3.

=== With Katrín Jakobsdóttir ===
- 2022 Reykjavík – glæpasaga
  - Reykjavík (translated by Victoria Cribb), Michael Joseph, London 2023, ISBN 978-0-241-62599-6; US edition: Reykjavík: A Crime Story, Minotaur Books, New York 2023, ISBN 978-1-250-90733-2.
- 2025 Franski spítalinn (not yet translated into English)

=== Standalone novels ===
- 2018 Þorpið
  - The Girl Who Died (translated by Victoria Cribb), Michael Joseph, London 2021, ISBN 978-0-241-40012-8.
- 2021 Úti
  - Outside (translated by Victoria Cribb), Michael Joseph, London 2022, ISBN 978-0-241-49365-6.
- 2025 Emilía (not yet translated into English)

=== Short stories ===
- 2026 Kistan – og fleiri sögur (not yet translated into English)
