= Grandma Lo-Fi =

Icelandic musician (1930–2011)

Sigríður Níelsdóttir
- Sigríður

Background information
- Also known as: Grandma Lo-Fi
- Born: Sigrid Maria Elisabeth Nielsen; 1930; Copenhagen, Denmark
- Died: 2011 (aged 81) Reyðarfjörður, Iceland
- Genres: Lo-fi
- Instrument: Keyboard
- Years active: 2001–2009

Sigríður Níelsdóttir (1930 – 2011, known as Grandma Lo-Fi (Icelandic: Amma Lo-Fi)) was an Icelandic musician.

Sigríður was born Sigrid Maria Elisabeth Nielsen in Copenhagen, Denmark in 1930 to Danish/German parents. She moved to Iceland in 1949, where she adopted her Icelandic name. In 1990, she moved to Brazil, but returned to Iceland eight years later.

In 2001, at the age of 70, Sigríður began to record lo-fi music in her Reykjavík kitchen, played on a Casio keyboard and recorded on a cassette deck. The albums were digitised, then duplicated to create fifty copies. Sigríður drew the covers herself, then sold them in the record shop 12 Tónar. Her output was prolific; within seven years she had recorded 59 albums.

Each album had 12 songs, but their content was hugely varied. Her catchy music incorporated everything from children's songs to kitchen percussion, and her lyrics covered from life at sea to elephants.

Sigríður was too shy to perform live herself, but other Icelandic musicians formed a group Stórsveit Sigríðar Níelsdóttur, that performed her music at The Icelandic Opera. She became a cult figure in the Icelandic music scene.

Sigríður stopped making music in 2009, and died in Reyðarfjörður in 2011, aged eighty-one.

== Documentary ==
A documentary film about Sigríður was released in 2011, entitled Grandma Lo-fi: The Basement Tapes of Sigrídur Níelsdóttir (Icelandic: Amma Lo-fi: Kjallaraspólur Sigríðar Níelsdóttur), and directed by Orri Jónsson, Kira Kira, and Ingibjörg Birgisdóttir. The film won the Sound & Vision Award at the Copenhagen International Documentary Film Festival in 2011, and was nominated for the Edda Awards in 2013.

Documentary poster
