= It Hatched =

2021 Icelandic horror film

- Film poster
- Directed by: Elvar Gunnarsson
- Written by: Elvar Gunnarsson; Ingimar Sveinsson
- Produced by: Bent Kingo; Guðfinnur Ýmir Harðarson; Magnús Ómarsson; Vilius Petrikas
- Starring: Gunnar Kristinsson; Vivian D. Ólafsdóttir
- Cinematography: Elvar Gunnarsson
- Edited by: Vilius Petrikas
- Music by: Elvar Gunnarsson
- Production company: Hero Productions
- Release date: 21 October 2021 (AFF)
- Running time: 96 minutes

It Hatched is a 2021 Icelandic horror film directed, shot, and scored by Elvar Gunnarsson, who co-wrote the screenplay with Ingimar Sveinsson. It stars Gunnar Kristinsson and Vivian D. Ólafsdóttir as a couple whose dreams of opening a bed and breakfast in the Westfjords come to a halt when she lays an egg containing a baby, after which an ancient demon escapes from under the basement.

The film premiered at the Austin Film Festival on 21 October 2021, where it was nominated for awards in the Dark Matters and Narrative categories. It also won Best International Film at the MidWest WeirdFest.
