= Elvar Gunnarsson =

Icelandic film director and screenwriter

- Born: 16 July 1982 (age 42)
- Occupations: film director; screenwriter

Elvar Gunnarsson (born 16 July 1982) is an Icelandic film director and screenwriter. Elvar was in the band XXX Rottweilerhundar; he graduated from the Icelandic Film School in 2005, and started working there after graduation.

Elvar directed the 2021 film It Hatched, which won the award for Best International Film at the Midwest Weirdfest.

== Filmography ==
- Einn (2012)
- It Hatched (2021)
