= Stella Blómkvist =

Icelandic crime TV series

Stella Blómkvist is an Icelandic crime television series which was first broadcast in 2017. It is produced by the Icelandic company Sagafilm. The show is loosely based on books of the same title by an anonymous Icelandic writer. The series was written by Jóhann Ævar Grímsson, Nanna Kristín Magnúsdóttir and Andri Óttarsson, and directed by Óskar Thór Axelsson.

After the success in Iceland the show became available in 2018 on Viaplay in the Nordic countries, in 2019 on Sundance Now in the United States and in 2020 SBS Australia acquired the rights for broadcasting in Australia.

After four years, a second season of the show premiered in Iceland on 30 September 2021 and became globally available in the months afterwards.

In April 2024, it was announced by broadcaster Síminn through an Instagram private message that the show would not be renewed for a third season.

== Synopsis ==
The show follows lawyer Stella Blómkvist who is called to defend a client suspected of murdering Halla, a young woman who works as an assistant for Sverrir, the Icelandic Prime Minister. Initially, the case seems pretty clear-cut, but Stella soon finds out that someone is trying to frame her client for the murder and higher powers are eager to close the case as soon as possible, to cover up their own involvement. When she receives an anonymous tip which suggests that the Prime Minister himself might have committed the murder she starts her own investigation, which leads her to uncover a web of corruption, involving Icelandic politicians and high ranking Chinese officials.

In season two Sverrir has been removed from power and Dagbjört, the woman with whom Stella had an affair in season one, has taken his place as the new Prime Minister of Iceland. She has imposed strict anti-abortion laws and has transformed the country into a semi-authoritarian state. Against this grim backdrop we see Stella struggle with her break-up with Dagbjört, while continuing to solve cases for her clients as a lawyer. She tries hard to forget Dagbjört, but this appears near impossible as the political turmoil in the country forces them to work together once more.

== Cast and characters ==
=== Main ===
- Heida Reed as Stella Blómkvist
- Sara Dögg Ásgeirsdóttir as Dagbjört
- Jóhannes Haukur Jóhannesson as Sverrir
- Kristín Þóra Haraldsdóttir as Gunna
- Þorsteinn Guðmundsson as Raggi
- Steinunn Ólína Þorsteinsdóttir as Edda

=== Recurring ===
- Bjarni Snæbjörnsson as Alexander
- David Yu as Guo Dai
- Sveinn Ólafur Gunnarsson as Valdi
- Hannes Óli Ágústsson as Haukur
- Kristín Lea as Halla (s1)
- Jóhann Kristófer Stefánsson as Sæmi
- Hilmar Guðjónsson police agent Steini
- Bing as Xi Feng
- Hanako Footman as Alba Noel (s2)
- Saga Garðarsdóttir as Myrra (s2)
- Adi Ezroni as Mossad Agent (s2)
- Ahd Tamimi as Nadim (s2)

== Episodes ==
Season 1
No.	Title	Directed by	Written by	Original release date
1.	"Murder at the Ministry" part 1	Óskar Thór Axelsson	Jóhann Ævar Grímsson, Andri Óttarsson, Nanna Kristín Magnúsdóttir	November 24, 2017
2.	"Murder at the Ministry" part 2	Óskar Thór Axelsson	Jóhann Ævar Grímsson, Andri Óttarsson, Nanna Kristín Magnúsdóttir	November 24, 2017
3.	"Murder at Swanlake" part 1	Óskar Thór Axelsson	Jóhann Ævar Grímsson, Andri Óttarsson, Nanna Kristín Magnúsdóttir	November 24, 2017
4.	"Murder at Swanlake" part 2	Óskar Thór Axelsson	Jóhann Ævar Grímsson, Andri Óttarsson, Nanna Kristín Magnúsdóttir	November 24, 2017
5.	"Murder at Harpa" part 1	Óskar Thór Axelsson	Jóhann Ævar Grímsson, Andri Óttarsson, Nanna Kristín Magnúsdóttir	November 24, 2017
6.	"Murder at Harpa" part 2	Óskar Thór Axelsson	Jóhann Ævar Grímsson, Andri Óttarsson, Nanna Kristín Magnúsdóttir	November 24, 2017

Season 2
No.	Title	Directed by	Written by	Original release date
1.	"Murder on Instagram" part 1	Óskar Thór Axelsson	Jóhann Ævar Grímsson, Jónas Margeir Ingólfsson, Dóra Jóhansdóttir	September 30, 2021
2.	"Murder on Instagram" part 2	Óskar Thór Axelsson	Jóhann Ævar Grímsson, Jónas Margeir Ingólfsson, Dóra Jóhansdóttir	September 30, 2021
3.	"Murder in the National History Museum" part 1	Thora Hilmarsdottir	Jóhann Ævar Grímsson, Dóra Jóhansdóttir, Snjolaug Ludviksdottir	September 30, 2021
4.	"Murder in the National History Museum" part 2	Thora Hilmarsdottir	Jóhann Ævar Grímsson, Dóra Jóhansdóttir, Snjolaug Ludviksdottir	September 30, 2021
5.	"Murder by the Cabin" part 1	Óskar Thór Axelsson	Jóhann Ævar Grímsson, Jónas Margeir Ingólfsson, Snjolaug Ludviksdottir	September 30, 2021
6.	"Murder by the Cabin" part 2	Óskar Thór Axelsson	Jóhann Ævar Grímsson, Jónas Margeir Ingólfsson, Snjolaug Ludviksdottir	September 30, 2021
