= Yrsa Sigurðardóttir =

Icelandic crime and children's writer (born 1963)

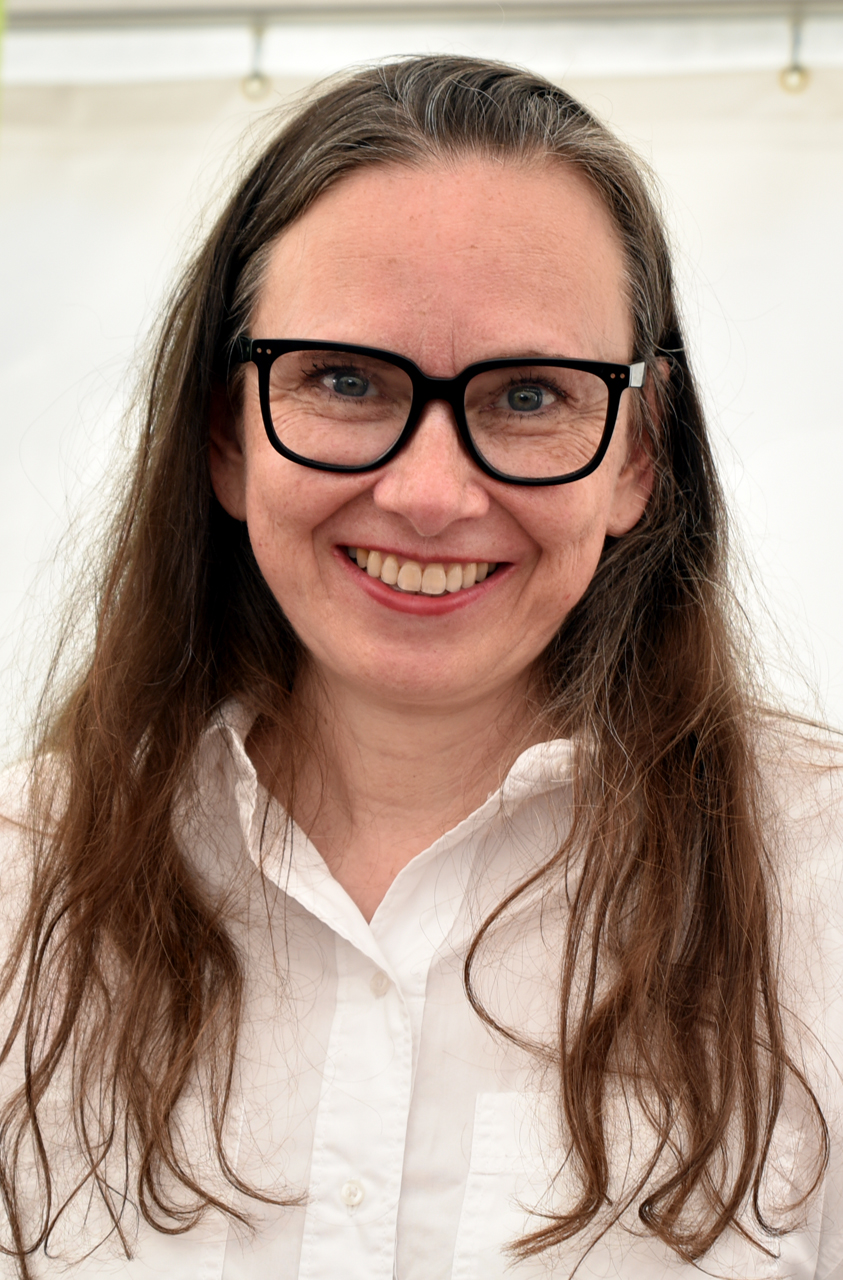
- Yrsa Sigurðardóttir in 2022
- Born: Vilborg Yrsa Sigurðardóttir; 24 August 1963 (age 63); Reykjavík, Iceland
- Occupations: Novelist, civil engineer
- Writing career
- Language: Icelandic
- Genres: Crime fiction, children's fiction, horror
- Notable works: Þóra Guðmundsdóttir series; Freyja and Huldar series; I Remember You
- Notable awards: Petrona Award (2015); Blóðdropinn (2011, 2015, 2021); Icelandic Children's Book Prize (2003)

Vilborg Yrsa Sigurðardóttir (born 24 August 1963) is an Icelandic writer of crime novels, horror and children's fiction, often described as the "queen of Icelandic crime fiction". Her novels have been translated into more than 30 languages, and she has won the Petrona Award for the best Scandinavian crime novel of the year and the Icelandic crime fiction award Blóðdropinn three times. Alongside her writing she has maintained a full career as a civil engineer. She is a co-founder of the Reykjavík literary festival Iceland Noir.

== Early life and engineering career ==
Yrsa was born in Reykjavík in 1963 and moved to Hafnarfjörður at the age of six. Her family later lived in Houston, Texas, while her parents studied there, returning to Iceland when she was twelve and settling in Seltjarnarnes. She attended Menntaskólinn í Reykjavík and studied civil engineering, later completing postgraduate studies in Canada, where she began writing while raising two small children. She has maintained a parallel engineering career throughout her writing life, working mainly on power projects in the hydroelectric and geothermal sectors; she served as technical manager on the Kárahnjúkar dam project in east Iceland, the largest construction project in Iceland's history. As of 2025 she continued to work part-time at the Reykjavík engineering firm Verkís, describing writing as having become the main job and engineering the sideline.

== Writing career ==
=== Children's books ===
Yrsa began her writing career with children's fiction, publishing her first book, Þar lágu Danir í því, in 1998. She won the 2003 Icelandic Children's Book Prize for Biobörn. After a seventeen-year break from children's literature, she returned to the genre in 2020 with Herra Bóbó, Amelía og ættbrókin, published in the same season as her crime novel Bráðin.

=== Þóra Guðmundsdóttir series ===
Yrsa made her crime fiction debut in 2005 with Þriðja táknið (English: Last Rituals), the first of six novels featuring the Reykjavík lawyer Þóra Guðmundsdóttir; the book was sold internationally and translated into English by Bernard Scudder. Someone to Watch Over Me was selected by The Sunday Times as a crime novel of the year, and the final novel in the series, Brakið (2011; English: The Silence of the Sea), won the 2015 Petrona Award for the best Scandinavian crime novel of the year.

=== Standalones ===
Her standalone novels include the horror-inflected ghost story Ég man þig (2010; English: I Remember You), which won Blóðdropinn in 2011 and was shortlisted for the Nordic Glass Key award, Kuldi (2012; The Undesired), Lygi (2013; Why Did You Lie?), a Sunday Times crime novel of the year that was shortlisted for the 2017 Petrona Award and longlisted for the International Dublin Literary Award, and Bráðin (2020; The Prey), for which she received Blóðdropinn as the best Icelandic crime novel of 2020; the win made the book Iceland's nominee for the Glass Key. The Prey was later shortlisted for the 2024 Petrona Award. Her latest standalone, Syndafall (2025; English title: A Fall From Grace), interweaving three narrative strands, debuted at number one on Iceland's hardcover bestseller list.

=== Freyja and Huldar series ===
Beginning with DNA (2014; English: The Legacy), Yrsa wrote a six-book series featuring the police detective Huldar and the child psychologist Freyja of the Children's House. DNA won Blóðdropinn in 2015, becoming Iceland's Glass Key nominee, and received the Danish Academy of Crime Writers' Palle Rosenkrantz Prize in 2017, and Aflausn (The Absolution) was shortlisted for the Petrona Award in 2020. The series was adapted into the Icelandic television series Reykjavík 112 (2025).

=== Black Ice series ===
Her most recent series, the Black Ice series, features the investigators Týr, Karó and Iðunn and comprises four novels: Lok, lok og læs (2021; English: Can't Run, Can't Hide), Gættu þinna handa (2022; The Wake), Frýs í æðum blóð (2023; The Depths) and Ég læt sem ég sofi (2024; Close Your Eyes). Close Your Eyes was the second best-selling fiction title in Iceland in 2024, and The Depths entered Der Spiegel's paperback fiction bestseller list at number five on its German release.

== Screenwriting and adaptations ==
Yrsa has written episodes for the Icelandic television series Trapped (Ófærð) and Pressa (The Press). Two of her novels have been adapted into Icelandic feature films, both starring Jóhannes Haukur Jóhannesson: I Remember You (Ég man þig), which premiered in May 2017, and Kuldi, directed by Erlingur Óttar Thoroddsen, which premiered in September 2023; Yrsa has said she prefers not to be involved in the screenwriting of adaptations of her books.

== Iceland Noir ==
In 2013 Yrsa co-founded the Reykjavík crime fiction festival Iceland Noir with Ragnar Jónasson. The festival began as a single-afternoon event at the Nordic House and has grown into a broad annual literary festival covering multiple genres as well as film and television, which the founders organise largely on a volunteer basis. Together with Jónasson she also established the Svartfuglinn (Blackbird) award for the best debut crime novel by an Icelandic author. In April 2026 Yrsa and Jónasson confirmed that they are writing a book together.

== Personal life ==
Yrsa is married to Ólafur Þór Þórðarson, whom she met as a teenager in Reykjavík; they have a son and a daughter. A self-described devotee of Christmas, she collects Christmas ornaments; her collection includes a rhinestone-studded skull bauble and one bearing the coat of arms of the Icelandic police, a gift from the National Police Commissioner.

== Awards and honours ==
- International Board on Books for Young People (IBBY) honour, 2000
- Icelandic Children's Book Prize, 2003, for Biobörn
- Blóðdropinn, 2011, for Ég man þig (I Remember You)
- Shortlisted, Shamus Award, 2010, for My Soul to Take
- Shortlisted, Glass Key award, 2011 (I Remember You) and 2014 (The Legacy)
- Shortlisted, Petrona Award, 2014, for Someone to Watch Over Me
- Blóðdropinn, 2015, for DNA (The Legacy)
- Petrona Award, 2015, for The Silence of the Sea
- Danish Academy of Crime Writers' Palle Rosenkrantz Prize, 2017, for The Legacy
- Shortlisted, Petrona Award, 2017, for Why Did You Lie?
- Longlisted, International Dublin Literary Award, 2018, for Why Did You Lie?
- Shortlisted, Petrona Award, 2020, for The Absolution
- Blóðdropinn, 2021, for Bráðin (The Prey), best Icelandic crime novel of 2020
- Shortlisted, Petrona Award, 2024, for The Prey

== Bibliography ==
=== Children's books ===
- Þar lágu Danir í því (1998)
- Við viljum jólin í júlí (1999)
- Barnapíubófinn, Búkolla og bókarræninginn (2000)
- B 10 (2001)
- Biobörn (2003)
- Herra Bóbó, Amelía og ættbrókin (2020)

=== Þóra Guðmundsdóttir series ===
- Þriðja táknið (2005) – English translation: Last Rituals (US 2007, UK 2008, translated by Bernard Scudder)
- Sér grefur gröf (2006) – English translation: My Soul to Take (2009, translated by Bernard Scudder and Anna Yates)
- Aska (2007) – English translation: Ashes to Dust (2010, translated by Philip Roughton)
- Auðnin (2008) – English translation: The Day is Dark (2011, translated by Philip Roughton)
- Horfðu á mig (2009) – English translation: Someone to Watch Over Me (2013, translated by Philip Roughton)
- Brakið (2011) – English translation: The Silence of the Sea (2014, translated by Victoria Cribb)

=== Freyja and Huldar series ===
- DNA (2014) – English translation: The Legacy (2017, translated by Victoria Cribb)
- Sogið (2015) – English translation: The Reckoning (2018, translated by Victoria Cribb)
- Aflausn (2016) – English translation: The Absolution (2019, translated by Victoria Cribb)
- Gatið (2017) – English translation: Gallows Rock (2020, translated by Victoria Cribb)
- Brúðan (2018) – English translation: The Doll (2021, translated by Victoria Cribb)
- Þögn (2019) – English translation: The Fallout (2022, translated by Victoria Cribb)

=== Black Ice series ===
- Lok, lok og læs (2021) – English translation: Can't Run, Can't Hide
- Gættu þinna handa (2022) – English translation: The Wake
- Frýs í æðum blóð (2023) – English translation: The Depths
- Ég læt sem ég sofi (2024) – English translation: Close Your Eyes

=== Standalone novels ===
- Ég man þig (2010) – English translation: I Remember You (2012, translated by Philip Roughton)
- Kuldi (2012) – English translation: The Undesired (2015, translated by Victoria Cribb)
- Lygi (2013) – English translation: Why Did You Lie? (2016, translated by Victoria Cribb)
- Bráðin (2020) – English translation: The Prey (2023, translated by Victoria Cribb)
- Syndafall (2025) – English title: A Fall From Grace
