= Lilja Sigurdardottir =

Icelandic crime-writer and playwright (born 1972)

Lilja Sigurðardóttir (born 1972 in the town of Akranes, Iceland) is an Icelandic writer of crime fiction, a playwright and a scriptwriter. She was raised in Mexico, Sweden, Spain and Iceland. She became a student at MH secondary school, trained as a secretary in England and later finished a BA degree in pedagogy and education at Háskóli Íslands, the University of Iceland. She has worked as an expert in the field of education and written and edited professional material for preschools.

== Books ==
Lilja has written nine crime novels that mostly take place in Reykjavík. Seven of them have been translated into English. Her first book, the crime fiction story Steps, was published in 2009 and well received; a year later came the next novel Forgiveness. After a break of several years, she returned in 2015 with Snare, the first in a new series, a trilogy called Reykjavik Noir. Snare introduced Sonja, a young mother who resorts to smuggling cocaine into Iceland, as she struggles to keep custody of her son, with devastating results. Sonja's relationship with her lover Agla adds to the difficulty of her situation. The setting was influenced by the Icelandic financial crisis. Lilja presented the book both in Iceland and abroad, and it was her English debut. The novel was shortlisted for the CWA International Dagger, a prestigious award from the British Crime Writers' Association, and was hitting bestseller lists worldwide. New York journal of books considered it to be ‘thriller of the year’. Trap, book number two, follows Sonja as her son is kidnapped by her ruthless ex-husband, and she is thrust back into the world of cocaine smuggling. This time she has a plan of her own how to deal with the criminal underworld. Cage culminates in the financial and criminal worlds battles for Sonja and Agla. The final instalment in the trilogy was highly praised, was The Guardian's Book of the Year, and a winner of the Blóðdropinn (Drop of Blood) for the Best Icelandic Crime Novel of the Year 2018. Lilja's next book Betrayal, a powerful, relevant, fast-paced standalone thriller, won Blóðdropinn in 2019. It told a story of the aid worker Úrsula returning to Iceland for a new job in the government, and becoming drawn into the dangerous worlds of politics, corruption and misogyny. Cold as Hell is the latest translation in English and the first book in a new trilogy Áróra Investigation, featuring financial investigator Áróra and police detective Daníel. Lilja's political and suspense thrillers are written in understated but punchy style, with short fast-paced chapters and intricate twisty plots. Often but not always they include LGBTQ themes, frequently looking at Icelandic society from the outsider's perspective. Lilja has deep empathy for her memorable characters, as she takes on various social issues, and classic Icelandic themes to combine them with modern outlook, in the society evolving post financial crisis 2008.

The books were well received by readers and have now been translated and published in many countries. The rights to her books have been sold to France/ Switzerland/ Luxembourg/ Canada (Éditions Métailié); Norway (Cappelen Damm); Czech Republic (LEDA); Denmark (People´s Press), Poland (Wydawnictwo Kobiece); Armenia (Guitank); Macedonia (Bata Press); Sweden (Bigarrábok); Romania (Crime Scene Press); World Arabic (Al Arabi); Germany (DuMont) and World English (Orenda Books).

Translators from Icelandic into the many languages include: Ursula Giger, Angela Schamberger, Anika Wolff, Tina Flecken (German), Quentin Bates (English), Jean-Christophe Salaün (French), Tone Myklebost (Norwegian), Lucie Korecká (Czech), Aya Ashraf (Arabic), Nanna Kalkar (Danish), Sara Lindberg Gombrii (Swedish), Jacek Godek (Polish) and Liviu Szoke (Romanian).

== Other work ==
Lilja attends various international literary and crime fiction festivals, such as Edinburgh International Book Festival, Theakston Old Peculier Crime Writing Festival, Bloody Scotland, CrimeFest, Quais du Polar, Krimimessen, Geneva Book Fair. For six years she was one of the organisers of IcelandNoir festival in Reykjavik.

Film rights to the Reykjavík Noir trilogy (Snare, Trap and Cage) have been sold to 66 Degrees North / Palomar Pictures International, based in California, US. The production is scheduled for 2022.

As a screenwriter Lilja worked with Baltasar Kormákur on the Netflix science fiction / supernatural TV series Katla. She wrote episode 2, titled Ása, and has storyline credit for 5 episodes of the series. Katla had a worldwide premiere on 17 June 2021.

Lilja lives by lake Elliðavatn with her partner and a dog on the outskirts of the Icelandic capital Reykjavík but spends a considerable amount of time in Scotland.

== Bibliography ==
- Steps (Spor) 2009 Bjartur Publishing
- Forgiveness (Fyrirgefning) 2010 Bjartur Publishing
- Big Babies (Stóru börnin), stage play 2013. Produced by Lab Loki theatre company 2013-2014 in Tjarnarbíó theatre
- Snare (Gildran) 2015 Forlagid (Reykjavík Noir Trilogy 1)
- Trap (Netið) 2016 Forlagid (Reykjavík Noir Trilogy 2)
- Cage (Búrið) 2017 Forlagid (Reykjavík Noir Trilogy 3)
- Betrayal (Svik) 2018 Forlagid
- Cold as Hell (Helköld sól) 2019 Forlagid (Áróra Investigation 1)
- Red as Blood (Blóðrauður sjór) 2020 Forlagid (Áróra Investigation 2)
- White as Snow (Náhvít jörð) 2021 Forlagid (Áróra Investigation 3)
- Dark as Night (Drepsvart hraun) 2024 Forlagid (Áróra Investigation 4)
- Black as Death (Dauðadjúp sprunga) 2025 Forlagid (Áróra Investigation 5)
