= Snorri Helgason =

Icelandic musician (born 1984)

- Born: Snorri Helgason; 1 June 1984 (age 42); Reykjavík, Iceland
- Genres: Pop; folk music
- Occupations: Singer; songwriter; musician
- Instruments: Guitar; piano; bass; banjo
- Years active: 2004–present
- Labels: Kimi; Record; Sena

Snorri Helgason (born 1 June 1984) is an Icelandic musician. He was the lead singer of the group Sprengjuhöllin before establishing a solo career.

He has performed in the United States and Canada.

== Discography ==
- I'm Gonna Put My Name on Your Door (2009)
- Winter Sun (2011)
- Autumn Skies (2013)
- Vittu til (2016)
- Margt býr í þokunni (2017)
