= The Home Game =

2023 Icelandic documentary film by Smari Gunn and Logi Sigursveinsson

- Theatrical release poster
- Icelandic: Heimaleikurinn
- Directed by: Smari Gunn; Logi Sigursveinsson
- Written by: Smari Gunn; Stephanie Thorpe
- Produced by: Freyja Kristinsdóttir; Elfar Adalsteins; Stephanie Thorpe; Heather Millard
- Starring: Freydís Bjarnadóttir; Viðar Gylfason; Kári Viðarsson
- Cinematography: Logi Sigursveinsson
- Edited by: Smari Gunn; Logi Sigursveinsson
- Music by: Kristján Sturla Bjarnason
- Production companies: Silfurskjár; The Freezer
- Release date: 30 May 2023
- Running time: 79 minutes
- Country: Iceland
- Language: Icelandic

The Home Game (Icelandic: Heimaleikurinn) is an Icelandic sports documentary directed by Smari Gunn and Logi Sigursveinsson.

The film premiered at Skjaldborg Film Festival on 30 May 2023.

== Premises ==
The film follows the journey of man's attempt to fulfill his father's dream; to gather a team of local people to play a long-awaited inaugural match on a football field that the father had built in the small fishing village of Hellissandur 25 years before.

== Accolades ==
In May 2023, the film won the Einarinn Audience Award at the Skjaldborg documentary film festival in Iceland. In September 2023, it won the City of Malmö's Audience Award at the Nordisk Panorama Film Festival.

In March 2024, it won the Audience award at the Glasgow Film Festival.

The Home Game was named Documentary of the Year in Iceland by the readers of Klapptré.
