= Blóðdropinn =

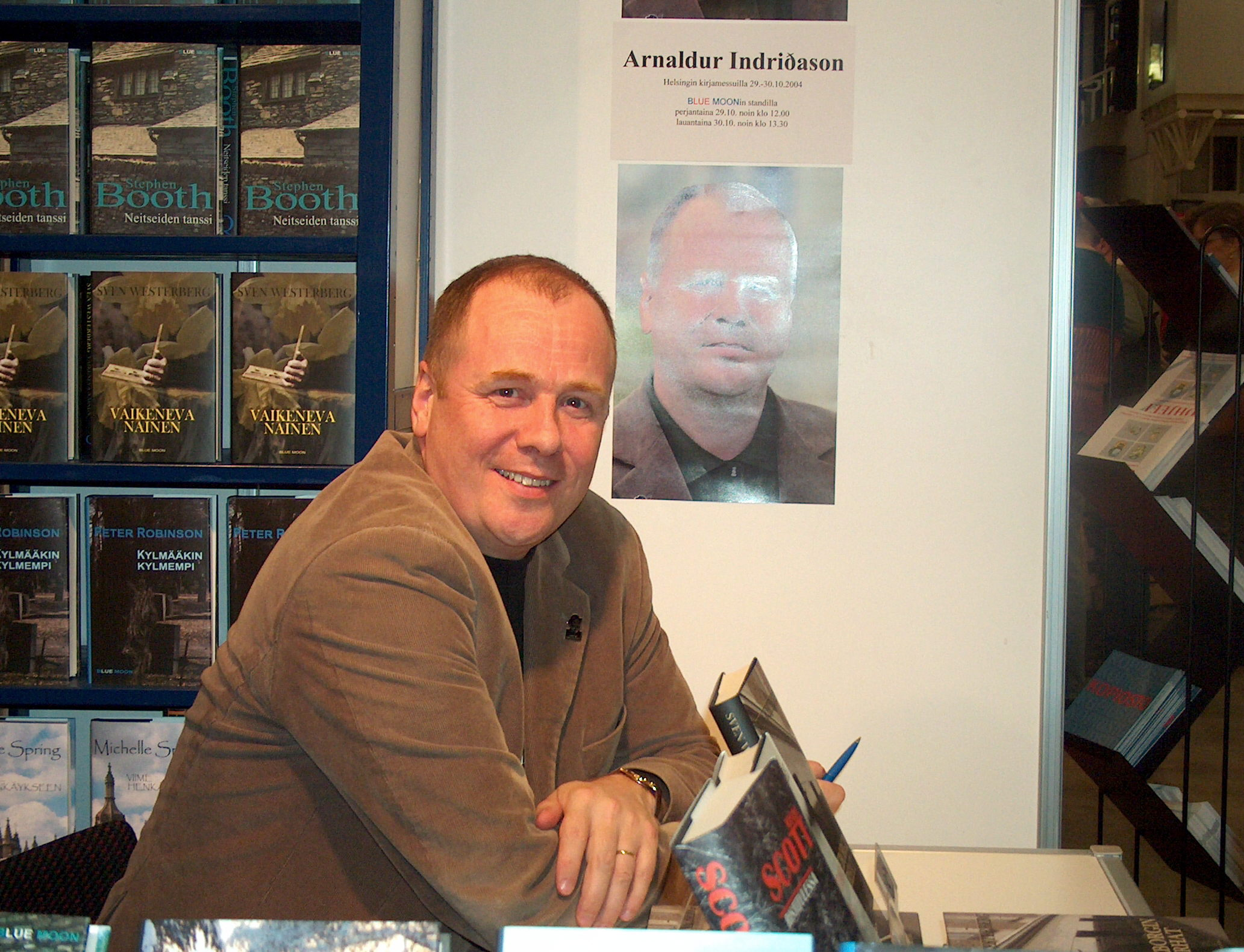
Arnaldur Indriðason, winner 2017

Blóðdropinn (Drop of Blood) is an annual Icelandic literary award for the best crime novel of the previous year, which has been awarded since 2007. The author of the winning novel becomes Iceland's candidate for the Glass Key award.

== Winners ==
Year	Author	Original title	English title
2019	Lilja Sigurðardóttir	Svik; JPV (Forlagið), Reykjavík 2018	
2018	Lilja Sigurðardóttir	Búrið; JPV útgáfa, Reykjavík 2016	Cage
2017	Arnaldur Indriðason	Petsamo; Vaka-Helgafell, Reykjavík 2016	
2016	Óskar Guðmundsson	Hilma; Draumsýn, Reykjavík 2015	
2015	Yrsa Sigurðardóttir	DNA; Veröld, Reykjavík 2014	The Legacy
2014	Stefán Máni	Grimmd; JPV, Reykjavík 2013	Cruelty
2013	Stefán Máni	Húsið; JPV, Reykjavík 2012	The House
2012	Sigurjón Pálsson	Klækir; Sigurjón Pálsson, Reykjavík 2011	Monkey business
2011	Yrsa Sigurðardóttir	Ég man þig Veröld, Reykjavík 2010	I Remember You; Hodder & Stoughton, London, 2012
2010	Helgi Ingólfsson	Þegar kóngur kom Ormstunga, Reykjavík 2009	When the King Came
2009	Ævar Örn Jósepsson	Land tækifæranna Uppheimar, Akranes 2008	Land of Opportunities
2008	Arnaldur Indriðason	Harðskafi; JPV, Reykjavík 2007	Hypothermia; Harvell Seckler; London, 2009
2007	Stefán Máni	Skipið; JPV, Reykjavík 2006	The Ship; Murdoch Books, Sydney 2012.
