= I Remember You (2017 film) =

2017 Icelandic mystery-horror film

- Film poster
- Icelandic: Ég man þig
- Directed by: Óskar Thór Axelsson
- Written by: Óskar Thór Axelsson; Ottó Geir Borg; Yrsa Sigurðardóttir (novel)
- Produced by: Skuli Fr. Malmquist; Sigurjon Sighvatsson; Thor Sigurjonsson
- Starring: Jóhannes Haukur Jóhannesson; Ágústa Eva Erlendsdóttir; Elma Stefania Agustsdottir; Thor Kristjansson; Anna Gunndís Guðmundsdóttir
- Cinematography: Jakob Ingimundarson
- Edited by: Kristján Loðmfjörð
- Production companies: Zik Zak Filmworks; Zik Zak Kvikmyndir
- Distributed by: TrustNordisk
- Release date: May 5, 2017
- Running time: 105 minutes
- Country: Iceland
- Language: Icelandic

I Remember You (Icelandic: Ég man þig) is a 2017 Icelandic mystery-horror film co-written and directed by Óskar Thór Axelsson. The film is based on the novel of the same name by Yrsa Sigurðardóttir.

== Plot ==
Freyr, a doctor in a city in Iceland, assists local police when an elderly woman is found hanged inside an old church. Crosses are found carved into her back, which is assumed to be the result of domestic abuse, but when the dead woman's husband insists he never touched her, policewoman Dagny links the death to the mysterious disappearance of a young boy, Bernódus, who vanished decades earlier. Dagny shows him a photograph of Bernódus's classmates, with eight of their faces scratched out with crosses. She explains that the classmates were known for bullying Bernódus, who had crosses carved on his back from his ultra-religious, abusive father (who blamed him for the death of his wife in childbirth). Six of the eight have been killed in mysterious accidents and were all found with crosses carved into their backs. Freyr, who is still reeling from the unsolved disappearance of his own son, Benni, while Benni was playing hide-and-seek with a friend, begins to see visions of Bernódus.

In the second plotline, married couple Katrin and Garðar (recovering from a recent estrangement), along with Katrin's best friend Líf, move to a small, abandoned hamlet to renovate an old, decades-abandoned house to turn into a bed and breakfast. While exploring the area, Katrin stumbles upon an old cemetery, with one of the graves missing a headstone. She begins to experience paranormal incidents around the area, including seeing Bernódus's ghost near the creek along with the missing headstone and hearing strange sounds in the house, which cause her to fall down the stairs and sprain her foot. As the house gets no cell phone reception, the group is unable to call for help. Katrin also ventures into the house's cellar, where she finds the body of Bernódus, who is carrying a picture of his mother, who resembles Katrin. The group is shaken by the discovery, but are again unable to get into contact with others. Katrin refuses to stay in the house any longer, and they move to another unoccupied home nearby.

Freyr continues to experience his own strange incidents. Benni's autistic friend only reveals that Benni was last seen in a "green submarine." The seventh bully of Bernódus is found dead after an apparent suicide attempt, and Freyr finds dozens of newspaper clippings about Benni's disappearance in one of his rooms. Freyr also learns that the eighth bully was Úrsúla, a woman he knows who is suffering from schizophrenia. An addled Úrsúla tells him that Benni is "at the bottom" of "somewhere green," but Freyr is unable to get more out of her; a clairvoyant who claims to be in contact with Benni's ghost gives similar information. Meanwhile, Katrin learns that Garðar and Líf were having an affair during their estrangement, which leaves her feeling betrayed. However, Garðar and Líf are still in love, and while Katrin is away, they plan to run away together and abandon Katrin. As they discuss their feelings, they are attacked by what appears to be a young boy who throws a stone through their window before running away to a nearby whale house. Garðar and Líf give chase and encounter Bernódus's ghost inside. The chimney then collapses on top of both of them. Katrin discovers Garðar dead and Líf mortally wounded. Katrin runs to try to find cell phone reception to call for help using Líf's phone, but in doing so discovers that Líf was pregnant with Garðar's baby, and the two were planning to run away together. A devastated Katrin leaves without calling, and goes to sleep in the cellar next to Bernódus's body.

Freyr awakens in the middle of the night and goes for a jog, where he once again sees Bernódus's ghost and gives chase. Bernódus leads him to a trapped Úrsúla, who claims that Bernódus is always with her; she reveals that she was the last one to see him before his disappearance, and saw him hiding in a boat, which she kept a secret for decades. Ursula also adds that Bernodus had been 'woken up' by the arrival of Benni's ghost to the house. Bernódus disembarked at the abandoned hamlet, which held the grave of his late mother, whose headstone Katrin discovered; alone, he wandered around the empty house before perishing in the cellar. Meanwhile, Benni's friend draws a green submarine, which his mother sends to Dagny. In a moment of inspiration, Dagny realizes that what he is describing is not a submarine, but a septic tank. She examines the gas station footage where Benni was last seen, and the footage reveals Katrin, Garðar and Líf; they were carrying a septic tank with them, which they were about to install during the house renovation.

It is revealed that Katrin, Garðar and Líf's plotline took place years earlier. Garðar and Líf's bodies were discovered, but Katrin was never found. Dagny posits that Benni crawled inside the septic tank in the gas station while the three were inside having a meal and died. They make their way to the abandoned house, where Benni's body is found inside the septic tank. Devastated but finally having closure, Freyr sits inside the house. Something draws him to the cellar, where the bodies of Katrin and Bernódus lay, but he shuts its door without looking inside. He leaves with Benni's body (including his blue-jacketed ghost, implying that he's no longer stuck), as the ghosts of Katrin and Bernódus hold hands and sadly watch him go.

== Cast ==
- Jóhannes Haukur Jóhannesson as Freyr
- Ágústa Eva Erlendsdóttir as Líf
- Elma Stefania Agustsdottir as Sara
- Thor Kristjansson as Garðar
- Anna Gunndís Guðmundsdóttir as Katrín

== Reception ==
On review aggregator Rotten Tomatoes, the film has an approval rating of 86% based on 7 reviews, with an average rating of 6.25/10. The website incorrectly spells the title "Eg man big". Cath Clarke from The Guardian gave the film three out of five stars and wrote: "Maybe it’s a matter of personal taste, but for me, the spectre of a supernatural explanation felt like a plot cop-out. Or perhaps the movie simply lacks a truly shocking moment of horror. It’s entertaining enough, but certainly didn’t have me reaching for a jumper." Frank Scheck from The Hollywood Reporter said: "I Remember You certainly traffics in clichés, such as its central character of an emotionally tortured investigator dealing with tragic events in his past. But the horror elements are relatively fresh to the genre, with director Axelsson teasing them out in intriguingly subtle fashion until the ending in which the various plot strands are satisfyingly tied together." Noel Murray from Los Angeles Times wrote: "But while the horror elements certainly could have been more horrifying, "I Remember You" does have a strong sense of place and character. The genre's a little twisted, but the film should still appeal to fans of books about moody detectives, doggedly pursuing justice against a frosty backdrop." Andy Webster from The New York Times, stated: "The Icelandic director Oskar Thor Axelsson is clearly fluent in horror conventions. But he has commendable restraint, and his latest film, “I Remember You,” transcends genre pyrotechnics even as it incorporates elements of Nordic noir."
