= Jón Kalman Stefánsson =

Icelandic author (born 1963)

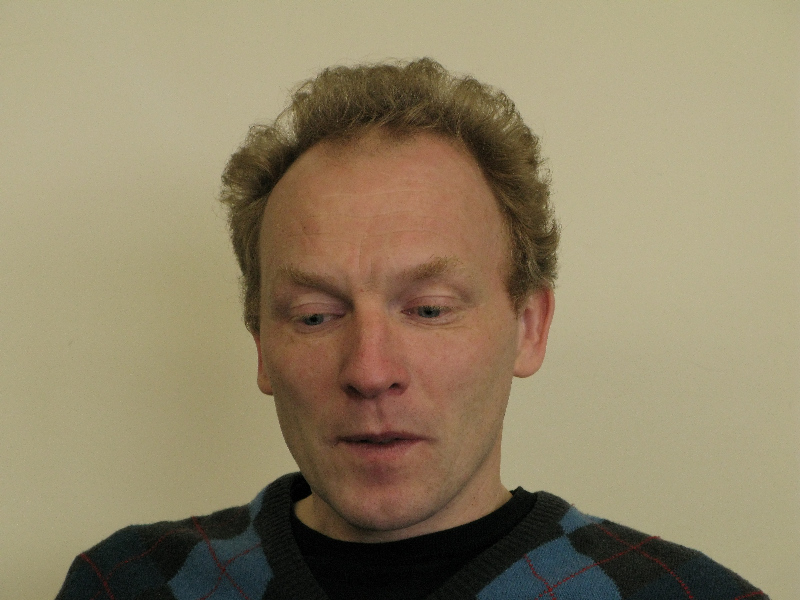
- Born: 17 December 1963 (age 62); Reykjavík, Iceland
- Occupation: author

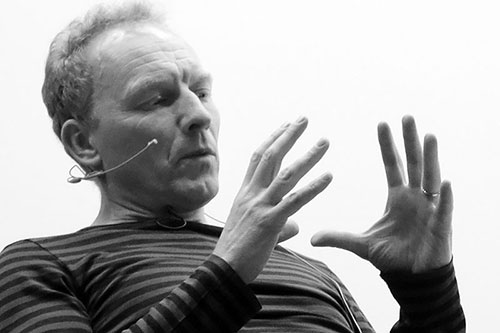
Jón Kalman Stefánsson in Aarhus Denmark, November 2015.

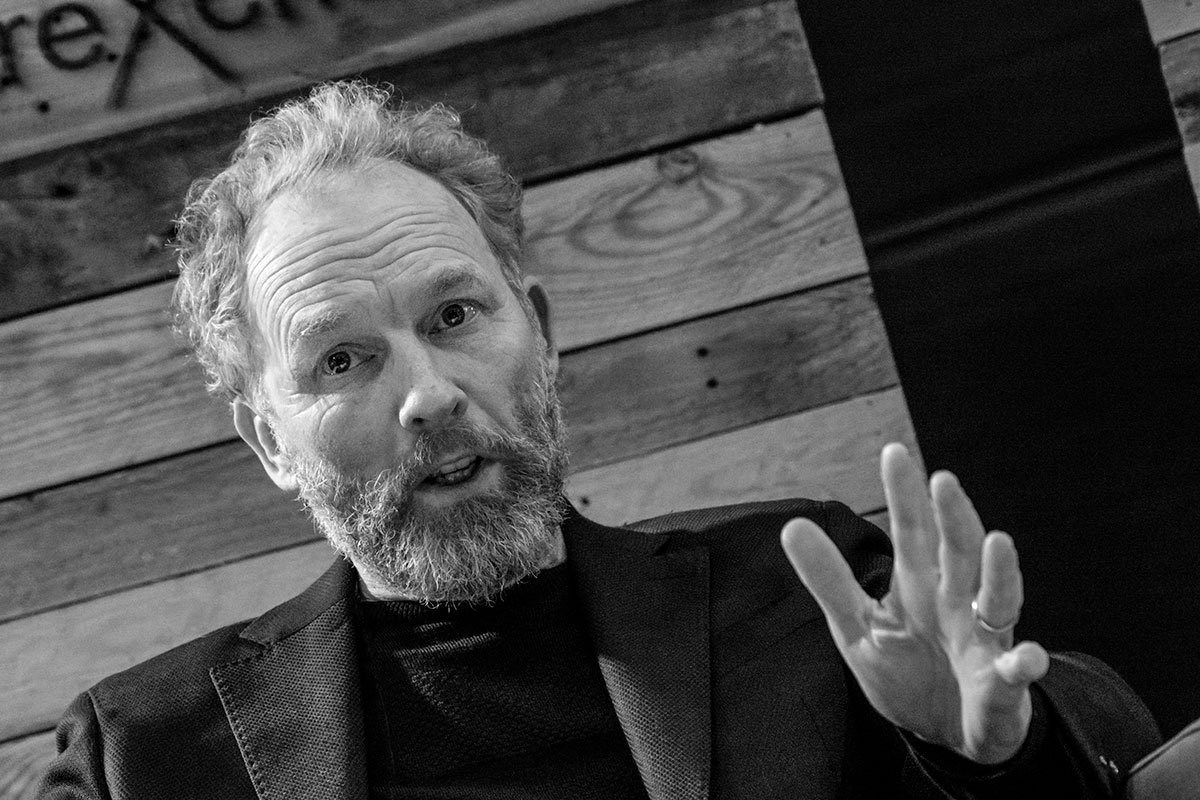
Aarhus Denmark, November 2022.

Jón Kalman Stefánsson (born 17 December 1963) is an Icelandic author.

== Biography ==
Jón Kalman was born in Reykjavík. He grew up there and in Keflavík. From 1975 to 1982, he lived in western Iceland, where he worked different jobs after finishing high school.

From 1986 to 1991, he studied literature at the University of Iceland, but did not pass an important exam. During this time, Stefánsson taught courses at high schools and wrote articles for the Icelandic newspaper Morgunblaðið. Between 1992 and 1995, he lived off various jobs in Copenhagen, Denmark. Afterwards he returned to Iceland and worked as a librarian for the Municipal Library in Mosfellsbær. Since then, he has been living as an independent author in Iceland.

In 2017 his novel Fish Have No Feet was nominated for the Man Booker International Prize. He has been nominated for the Nordic Council Literature Prize four times.

== Bibliography ==
=== Novels ===
- Skurðir í rigningu (1996, "Ditches in rain")
- Sumarið bakvið Brekkuna (1997, "The Summer Behind the Hill")
- Birtan á fjöllunum (1999, "The Light on the Mountains")
- Ýmislegt um risafurur og tímann (2001, "A Few Things about Giant Pines and Time")
- Snarkið í stjörnunum (2003, "Sparkle in the stars")
- Sumarljós og svo kemur nóttin (2005) / Summer Light and Then Comes the Night (HarperVia, 2020, translator Philip Roughton)
- Himnaríki og helvíti (2007) / Heaven and Hell (MacLehose Press, 2010, translator Philip Roughton)
- Harmur englanna (2009) / The Sorrow of Angels (MacLehose Press, 2013, translator Philip Roughton)
- Hjarta mannsins (2011) / The Heart of Man (MacLehose Press, 2015, translator Philip Roughton)
- Fiskarnir hafa enga fætur (2013) / Fish Have No Feet (MacLehose Press, 2016, translator Philip Roughton)
- Eitthvað á stærð við alheiminn: ættarsaga (2015) / About the Size of the Universe (MacLehose Press, 2019, translator Philip Roughton)
- Saga Ástu: Hvert fer maður ef það er engin leið út úr heiminum? (2017, "Asta's story: Where do you go if there is no way out of the world?")
- Fjarvera þin er myrkur (Bjartur, Reykjavík, 2020) / Your Absence is Darkness (MacLehose Press, 2024, translator Philip Roughton)
- Guli kafbáturinn ("The Yellow Submarine", Forlagið, Reykjavík, 2022)
- Himintungl yfir heimsins ystu brún ("Planets above the World's Edge", Benedikt, Reykjavík, 2024)

=== Poetry ===
- Með byssuleyfi á eilífðina ("With a gun license for eternity", 1988)
- Úr þotuhreyflum guða ("From the jet engines of the gods", 1989)
- Hún spurði hvað ég tæki með mér á eyðieyju ("She asked what I would take with me to a desert island", 1993)
- Þyngsta frumefnið ("The Heaviest Element", 2025)
