= Svandís Dóra Einarsdóttir =

Icelandic stage and film actress (born 1984)

- Born: 5 July 1984 (age 40); Iceland
- Education: Iceland Academy of the Arts
- Occupation: Actress

Svandís Dóra Einarsdóttir (born 5 July 1984) is an Icelandic actress. She is known for her role in In Front of Others (Icelandic: Fyrir framan annað fólk), for which she was nominated as Best Supporting Actress at the 2017 Edda Awards, and as Brynja in the TV-series Afturelding. She graduated from the Iceland Academy of the Arts in 2010. Svandís Dóra Einarsdóttir is known for her role in Trapped (Icelandic TV series) as Sonja, chief of the narcotics division; investigating Danish Hopper.

== Personal life ==
Svandís is married to Sigtryggur Magnason.
