= A White, White Day =

2019 film

- Film poster
- Icelandic: Hvítur, Hvítur Dagur
- Directed by: Hlynur Pálmason
- Written by: Hlynur Pálmason
- Starring: Ingvar Eggert Sigurðsson; Ída Mekkín Hlynsdóttir; Hilmir Snær Guðnason; Sara Dögg Ásgeirsdóttir
- Cinematography: Maria von Hausswolff
- Edited by: Julius Krebs Damsbo
- Music by: Edmund Finnis
- Release dates: 16 May 2019 (Cannes); 6 September 2019 (Iceland)
- Running time: 109 minutes
- Country: Iceland
- Language: Icelandic
- Budget: $2.8 million
- Box office: $836,600

A White, White Day (Icelandic: Hvítur, Hvítur Dagur) is a 2019 Icelandic drama film directed by Hlynur Pálmason. It premiered in the Critics' Week section at the Cannes Film Festival on 16 May 2019. It won Best Film Award at the 2019 Torino Film Festival. It was selected as the Icelandic entry for the Best International Feature Film at the 92nd Academy Awards, but it was not nominated.

== Plot ==
Police chief Ingimundur, whose wife died in a car accident, reluctantly undergoes grief counselling. He works constantly on renovating a farm building for his daughter Elín's family, and sometimes looks after her daughter Salka.

After Elín gives him some of her mother's effects, he's shocked to find a video evidently recording an affair she had with a man called Olgeir Olafsson. He stakes out Olgeir's home and joins his football club. Bad weather closes the roads; while having a pixelated online therapy session, Ingimundur snaps and trashes the room, beating up two colleagues when they protest and locking them in the cells. Insulting his granddaughter Salka to get rid of her, he kidnaps Olgeir and takes him at gunpoint to a grave he's dug. He demands to know the truth about the affair, and what Olgeir thought of his wife. Olgeir obliges and Ingimundur yells in fury; Olgeir flees.

The next day Olgeir confronts and stabs Ingimundur, terrifying Salka. With a bleeding arm, Ingimundur carries the girl home through another white-out, apologising for being rude. Having finally acknowledged his grief and anger, he has a vision of his wife undressing and smiling at him as he weeps.

== Cast ==
- Ingvar Eggert Sigurðsson as Ingimundur
- Ída Mekkín Hlynsdóttir (Note: Real-life daughter of the director, Hlynur Pálmason.) as Salka
- Hilmir Snær Guðnason as Olgeir
- Sara Dögg Ásgeirsdóttir as Ingimundur's wife

== Release ==
A White, White Day had its world premiere in the Critics' Week section at the Cannes Film Festival on 16 May 2019. It was screened in the Contemporary World Cinema section at the Toronto International Film Festival on 6 September 2019.

It was first theatrically released in Iceland on 6 September 2019 and on VOD by Film Movement Video on 11 August 2020.

== Reception ==
=== Box office ===
A White, White Day did not have a theatrical release in North America, but grossed $836,600 in other territories, against a production budget of $2.8 million.

=== Critical response ===
On the review aggregator Rotten Tomatoes, the film holds an approval rating of 95% based on 73 reviews, with an average rating of 7.5/10. The website's critics consensus reads: "A White, White Day plunges viewers into the darkness of grief and jealousy, led by Ingvar Eggert Sigurðsson's brilliantly layered performance." On Metacritic, the film has a weighted average score of 81 out of 100, based on 15 critics, indicating "universal acclaim".

Peter Bradshaw of The Guardian praised the film for its "startling aesthetic choices" and "enigmatic opening sequence." Brian Tallerico, writing for RogerEbert.com, gave the film 3 stars whilst positively highlighting leading man Sigurðsson. He also praised the ending with "such a devastating, powerful final shot that it alone erases most criticisms." Variety praised the film's deliberate pacing that is preoccupied less with "ticking-clock storylines" but "slow cinema" often associated with foreign film directors outside the Hollywood bubble. It is described as "a terrifying, soul-rattling character study" which makes Pálmason one of "the most important voices of this emerging generation."

== See also ==
- List of submissions to the 92nd Academy Awards for Best International Feature Film
- List of Icelandic submissions for the Academy Award for Best International Feature Film
