= Hera Hilmar =

Icelandic actress (born 1988)

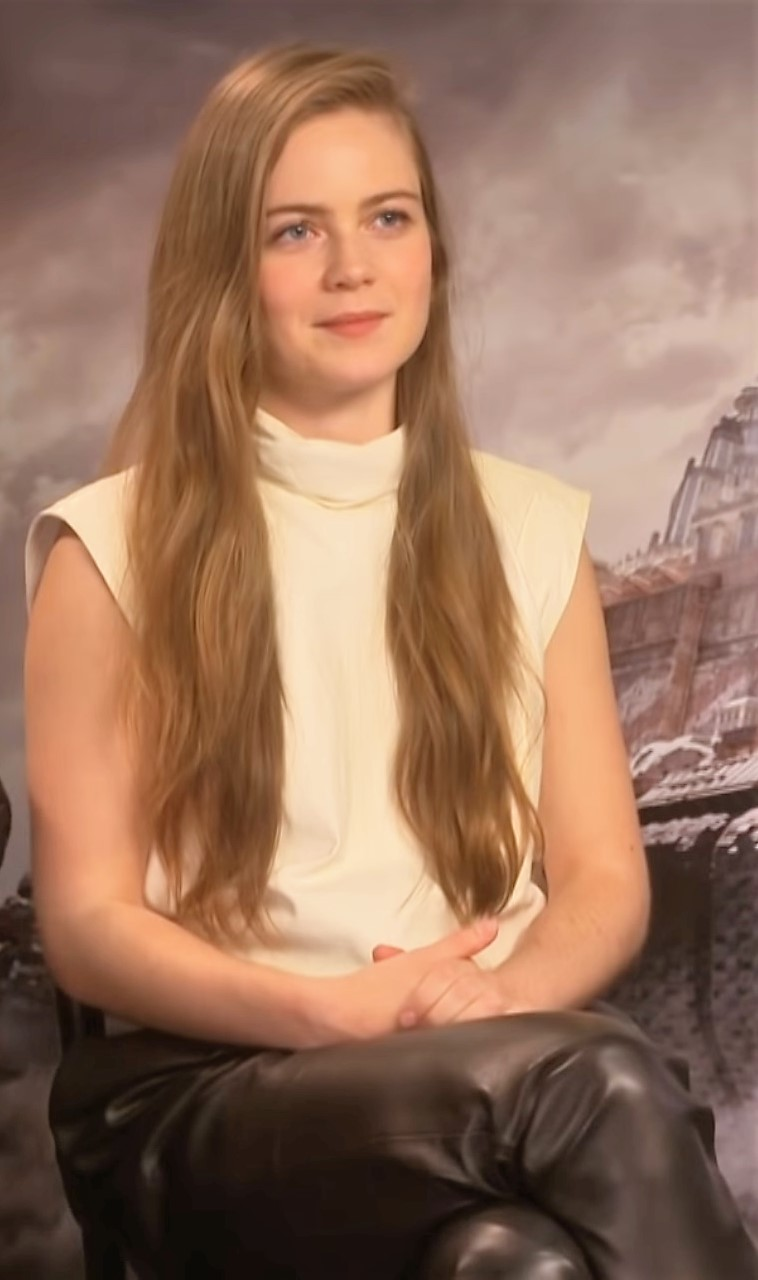
- Hera talks to MTV about Mortal Engines in 2018
- Born: Hera Hilmarsdóttir; 27 December 1988 (age 37); Reykjavík, Iceland
- Occupation: Actress
- Years active: 1995–present
- Father: Hilmar Oddsson

Hera Hilmarsdóttir (born 27 December 1988), known professionally as Hera Hilmar, is an Icelandic actress. Starting her career as a child actor, she has been active in the film industry since 1995.

== Personal life ==
Hera is the daughter of the film director Hilmar Oddsson and actress Thorey Sigthorsdottir (Icelandic: Þórey Sigþórsdóttir). Her grandfather was playwright and theater director Oddur Björnsson.

She graduated from the London Academy of Music and Dramatic Art in 2011.

== Career ==
Hera was nominated for an Edda as Actress of the Year in a leading role in 2007 for her role in The Quiet Storm. She joined Da Vinci's Demons in 2013 as Vanessa Moschella, an outspoken Florentine barmaid and occasional model for Leonardo.

Later she won the same award (Edda) twice, first in 2015 for her role as Eik in Life in a Fishbowl, and then in 2017 for her role as Anna in The Oath. She was also chosen as one of Europe's Shooting Stars at the Berlin International Film Festival in 2015, as well as winning a ‘special mention’ at the Zurich Film Festival for her role in Life in a Fishbowl.

In 2015, Hera appeared in the period drama film The Ottoman Lieutenant, playing Lillie Rowe, a 20-year-old nurse from a prominent Philadelphia family. Around the same time, Hera played Tanja, a Serbian agent disguised as a housemaid alongside Ben Kingsley in Brad Silberling's film, An Ordinary Man, which was later screened in 2017 before being released direct-to-video in June 2018. In 2016, Hera starred in The Ashram, which would be released two years later.

In February 2017, Hera was doing a play in Iceland when she heard about Peter Jackson’s film, Mortal Engines, based on the novel of the same name by Philip Reeve. Writer Philippa Boyens described her audition via Skype as "flawless", and she was cast thereafter. Her character, Hester Shaw, is different than in the novel, as she is older and a protagonist. Upon release in December 2018, she recounted reading the source material and going through the action that the complexly crafted world demanded. She tried to understand more during filming, which took place between April and July 2017.

In June 2018, Hera was cast in Matt Weiner's anthology series The Romanoffs. On October 18, 2018, it was reported that she had joined the Apple TV+ series See, alongside Christian Camargo. She plays Maghra, the wife of Baba Voss, a character played by Jason Momoa.

During the pandemic, Hera collaborated with The Icelandic Film Centre for the 2020 short films Last Dance and Óskin, or “The Wish”. She also starred as the leading role “Helga” in Ása Helga Hjörleifsdóttir’s feature film adaptation of Svar við bréfi Helgu, or A Letter from Helga. In addition, she provided the narration for a video revealing the new national Icelandic football team crest.

In 2024, Hera was cast in the Canadian thriller film Hangashore.

== Filmography ==
=== Film ===
Year	Title	Role	Director	Notes
1995	Tears of Stone	Jón's Daughter	Hilmar Oddsson (3)	
1998	No Trace	Child	Hilmar Oddsson (3)	
2006	An Ordinary Day	Unknown	Hilmar Oddsson (3)	Short film
2007	The Quiet Storm	Disa	Guðný Halldórsdóttir	
2008	Two Birds	Lára	Rúnar Rúnarsson	Short film
2010	Undercurrent	Unknown	Árni Ólafur Ásgeirsson	
2012	Anna Karenina	Varya Chirkova	Joe Wright	
2013	We Are the Freaks	Iona	Justin Edgar	
2013	The Fifth Estate	WikiLeaks Staffer #2	Bill Condon	
2014	Life in a Fishbowl	Eik	Baldvin Zophoníasson	
2014	Get Santa	WPC Boyle	Christopher Smith	
2016	Alleycats	Trix	Ian Bonhôte	
2016	The Oath	Anna	Baltasar Kormákur	
2017	The Ottoman Lieutenant	Lillie Rowe	Joseph Ruben	
2017	An Ordinary Man	Tanja	Brad Silberling	
2017	Summer Children	Unknown	Guðrún Ragnarsdóttir	
2018	The Ashram	Sophie	Ben Rekhi	
2018	Mortal Engines	Hester Shaw	Christian Rivers	
2020	The Wish	Halla	Inga Lísa Middleton	Short film
2020	Last Dance	Woman	Ása Helga Hjörleifsdóttir (2)	Short film
2022	A Letter from Helga	Helga	Ása Helga Hjörleifsdóttir (2)	
2022	Driving Mum	Bergdís	Hilmar Oddsson (4)	
2025	Hangashore	Vera	Justin Oakey	
2025	Turbulence	Emmy	Claudio Fäh	

=== Television ===
Year	Title	Role	Notes
2007	Áramótaskaupið	Unknown	Episode: "Áramótaskaupið 2007"
2008	Black Angels	Aðalheiður	6 episodes
2009	The Cliff	Una	4 episodes
2012	World Without End	Margery	2 episodes
2012	Leaving	Paulina	3 episodes
2013–2015	Da Vinci's Demons	Vanessa Moschella	25 episodes
2016	Harley and the Davidsons	Emma Davidson	3 episodes
2018	The Romanoffs	Ondine	Episode: "The One That Holds Everything"
2019–2022	See	Maghra Kane	24 episodes
2025	Reykjavik Fusion	Marý	6 episodes
