= Brun bitter =

- Directed by: Sølve Skagen
- Written by: Sølve Skagen; Gunnar Staalesen
- Starring: Frank Krog; Kristin Kajander; Anne Krigsvoll
- Release date: 17 November 1988
- Running time: 83 minutes
- Country: Norway
- Language: Norwegian

Brun bitter (English: Brown bitter), also called Hair of the Dog, is a 1988 Norwegian crime film directed by Sølve Skagen, starring Frank Krog, Kristin Kajander and Anne Krigsvoll. The screenplay is also by Skagen, based on the book Din, til døden, by Gunnar Staalesen. The story is typical of a film noir, with the detective Alexander 'Lex' Larsen (Krog) attempting to clear the femme fatale Vigdis Wang (Kajander) of a charge of murder.

== Cast ==
- Frank Krog as Alexander 'Lex' Larsen
- Kristin Kajander as Vigdis Wang
- Anne Krigsvoll as Liv Bredesen
- Rolf Skøien as Johnny 'Jocken'
- Vidar Sandem as Jens Falch a.k.a. Falchen
- Svein Erik Brodal as Asbjørn, videomann
- Rulle Smit as Charlotte
- Dan Kristoffer Ree as Kristoffer 'Kolumbus'
- Bjørn Floberg as Sebastian Ramberg
- Eva von Hanno as Kontordame
- Fredrik Rütter as Mikkelsen
- Morten Faldaas as Windy
- Bjarne Thomsen as Salasso
- Odd Furøy as Forhørsdommer
- Wiggo Lebsanft as Gudmund Holte
- Kine Hellebust as Astrid Holte
- Tone Schwarzott as Religiøs dame
- Siva Rita Engra Ringdal as Siarita
