= Count Me Out (1997 film) =

1997 film

- Directed by: Ari Kristinsson
- Written by: Ari Kristinsson
- Starring: Bergþóra Aradóttir
- Release date: 26 December 1997
- Running time: 84 minutes
- Country: Iceland
- Language: Icelandic

Count Me Out (Icelandic: Stikkfrí) is a 1997 Icelandic comedy film directed by Ari Kristinsson. The film was selected as the Icelandic entry for the Best Foreign Language Film at the 71st Academy Awards, but was not accepted as a nominee.

== Cast ==
- Bergþóra Aradóttir as Hrefna
- Freydís Kristófersdóttir as Yrsa
- Edda Heidrún Backman as Yrsa's mom
- Halldóra Björnsdóttir as Hrefna's mom
- Maria Ellingsen as Pálina
- Bergsveinn Eyland as Kerru strákur
- Halldóra Geirharðsdóttir as Margrét 'Magga'

== See also ==
- List of submissions to the 71st Academy Awards for Best Foreign Language Film
- List of Icelandic submissions for the Academy Award for Best Foreign Language Film
