= Tõnu Kõrvits =

Estonian composer (born 1969)

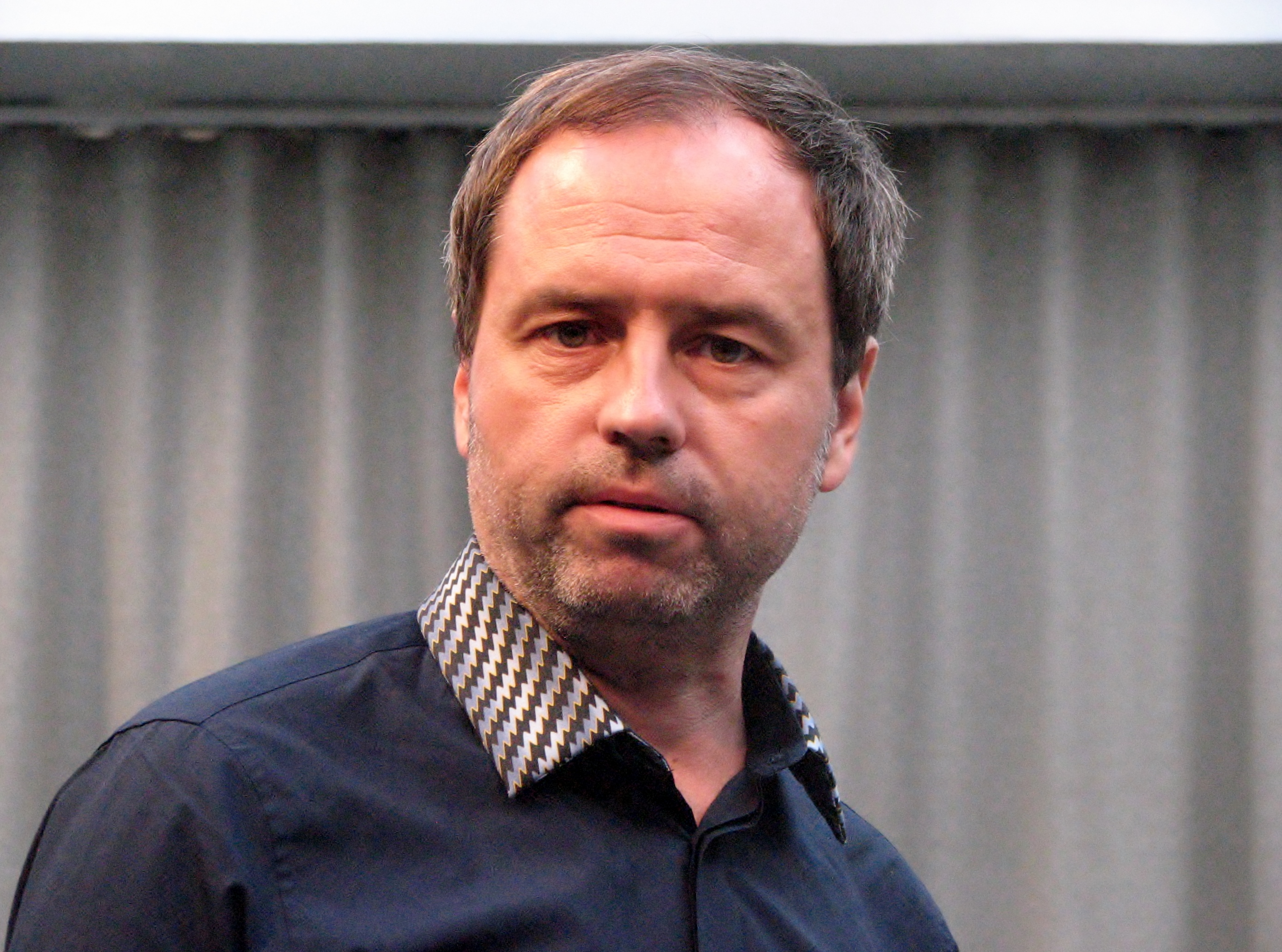
- Kõrvits in 2013.
- Born: April 9, 1969 (age 57); Tallinn, then part of Estonian SSR, Soviet Union
- Education: Estonian Academy of Music and Theatre
- Occupations: Composer, teacher

Tõnu Kõrvits (born 9 April 1969) is an Estonian composer.

Kõrvits was born in Tallinn. In 1994 he graduated from the Estonian Academy of Music and Theatre with specialty in composition.

Since 2001 he has taught composition and instrumentation at the Estonian Academy of Music and Theatre.

Since 1994 he has been a member of the Estonian Composers' Union.

== Awards ==
- 2001: Heino Eller Music Prize
- 2016: Order of the White Star, 3rd Class
- 2018: Lepo Sumera Award for Composition
- 2012 and 2016: Cultural Prize of the Republic of Estonia
- 2015: Estonian Public Broadcasting chose Tõnu Kõrvits as the Musician of the Year
- 2022: 26th Tallinn Black Nights Film Festival (PÖFF) Official Selection Competition: Best Original Score (for a film “Á ferð með mömmu / Driving Mum” by Hilmar Oddsson)
- 2024 Edda Awards: Best Original Score (for a film “Á ferð með mömmu / Driving Mum” by Hilmar Oddsson)

== Albums ==
- 2013: “Kreek’s Notebook” (Hyperion Records). Music performed by Royal Holloway Choir, Britten Symphony Conducted by Rupert Gough
- 2016: “Mirror” (ECM Records). Music performed by Anja Lechner (cello), Kadri Voorand (vocal), Estonian Philharmonic Chamber Choir, Tallinn Chamber Orchestra. Conducted by Tõnu Kaljuste. Produced by Manfred Eicher.
- 2017: “Moorland Elegies” on a poems by Emily Bronte (Ondine Records). Music performed by Estonian Philharmonic Chamber Choir, Tallinn Chamber Orchestra. Conducted by Risto Joost
- 2020: “Hymns to the Nordic Lights” (Ondine Records). Music performed by Meelis Vind (bass clarinet), Estonian National Symphony Orchestra. Conducted by Risto Joost
- 2020: “Sei la luce e il mattino / You are Light And Morning” on a poems by Cesare Pavese (Ondine Records). Music performed by Estonian Philharmonic Chamber Choir, Tallinn Chamber Orchestra. Conducted by Risto Joost
- 2023: “Tiibade Hääl / The Sound of Wings” on a poems by Doris Kareva (Ondine Records). Music performed by Estonian Philharmonic Chamber Choir, Tallinn Chamber Orchestra. Conducted by Risto Joost

== Works ==
- 2005: chamber opera "My Swans, My Thoughts"
- 2006: chamber opera "Firegarden"
- 2014: “Stabat Mater” for mixed choir
- 2014: "Canticle of the Sun" for mixed choir
- 2015: "Moorland Elegies" for choir and orchestra, based on works by Emily Bronte
- 2019: "You Are Light and Morning" for choir and orchestra, based on works by Cesare Pavese
- 2022: "The Sound of Wings" for choir and orchestra, inspired by Amelia Earhart
