= List of submissions to the 59th Academy Awards for Best Foreign Language Film =

1986 Best Foreign Language Film submissions

Highlights
- Oscar winner: (Netherlands) The Assault
- Submissions: 32
- Debuts: 1

This is a list of submissions to the 59th Academy Awards for Best Foreign Language Film. The Academy Award for Best Foreign Language Film was created in 1956 by the Academy of Motion Picture Arts and Sciences to honour non-English-speaking films produced outside the United States. The award is handed out annually, and is accepted by the winning film's director, although it is considered an award for the submitting country as a whole. Countries are invited by the Academy to submit their best films for competition according to strict rules, with only one film being accepted from each country.

Puerto Rico submitted a film for consideration for the first time. For the 59th Academy Awards, thirty-two films were submitted in the category Academy Award for Best Foreign Language Film. The five nominated films came from Austria, Canada, Czechoslovakia, France and Netherlands. Austria and Canada were nominated for the first time.

Netherlands won the award for the first time with The Assault by Harry Mulisch.

== Submissions ==
| Submitting country | Film title used in nomination | Original title | Language(s) | Director(s) | Result |
|---|---|---|---|---|---|
| Algeria | The Last Image | La dernière image | French | Mohammed Lakhdar-Hamina | Not nominated |
| Argentina | Tangos, the Exile of Gardel | Tangos, el exilio de Gardel | Spanish, French | Fernando Solanas | Not nominated |
| Austria | 38 | 38 – Auch das war Wien | German | Wolfgang Glück | Nominated |
| Belgium | Jumping | Springen | Dutch | Jean-Pierre De Decker | Not nominated |
| Brazil | The Hour of the Star | A Hora da Estrela | Brazilian Portuguese | Suzana Amaral | Not nominated |
| Canada | The Decline of the American Empire | Le Déclin de l'empire américain | French, English | Denys Arcand | Nominated |
| China | Dr. Sun Yat-sen | 孙中山 | Mandarin | Ding Yinnan | Not nominated |
| Colombia | Time to Die | Tiempo de morir | Spanish | Jorge Alí Triana | Not nominated |
| Czechoslovakia | My Sweet Little Village | Vesnicko má stredisková | Czech | Jiří Menzel | Nominated |
| Denmark | The Dark Side of the Moon | Manden i månen | Danish | Erik Clausen | Not nominated |
| Finland | The Unknown Soldier | Tuntematon sotilas | Finnish | Rauni Mollberg | Not nominated |
| France | Betty Blue | 37°2 le matin | French | Jean-Jacques Beineix | Nominated |
| West Germany | Men... | Männer... | German | Doris Dörrie | Not nominated |
| Hungary | Cat City | Macskafogó | Hungarian | Béla Ternovszk | Not nominated |
| Iceland | The Beast | Eins og skepnan deyr | Icelandic | Hilmar Oddsson | Not nominated |
| India | The Pearl | சிப்பிக்குள் முத்து | Telugu | K. Viswanath | Not nominated |
| Israel | Avanti Popolo | אוונטי פופלו | Hebrew, Arabic, English | Rafi Bukai | Not nominated |
| Italy | Summer Night | Notte d'estate con profilo greco, occhi a mandorla e odore di basilico | Italian | Lina Wertmüller | Not nominated |
| Japan | Final Take | キネマの天地 | Japanese | Yōji Yamada | Not nominated |
| Mexico | The Realm of Fortune | El imperio de la fortuna | Spanish | Arturo Ripstein | Not nominated |
| Netherlands | The Assault | De aanslag | Dutch, English, German | Fons Rademakers | Won Academy Award |
| Norway | Hard Asphalt | Hard asfalt | Norwegian | Sølve Skagen | Not nominated |
| Poland | Axiliad | Siekierezada | Polish | Witold Leszczyński | Not nominated |
| Puerto Rico | La Gran Fiesta | | Spanish | Marcos Zurinaga | Not nominated |
| Romania | The Last Assault | Noi, cei din linia întîi | Romanian | Sergiu Nicolaescu | Not nominated |
| Soviet Union | The Wild Pigeon | Чужая белая и рябой | Russian | Sergei Solovyov | Not nominated |
| South Korea | Eunuch | 내시 | Korean | Doo-yong Lee | Not nominated |
| Spain | Half of Heaven | La mitad del cielo | Spanish | Manuel Gutiérrez Aragón | Not nominated |
| Sweden | The Sacrifice | Offret | Swedish, English, French | Andrei Tarkovsky | Not nominated |
| Switzerland | Tanner | Der Schwarze Tanner | Swiss German | Xavier Koller | Not nominated |
| Taiwan | The Heroic Pioneers | 唐山过台湾 | Mandarin | Li Hsing | Not nominated |
| Yugoslavia | Happy New Year '49 | Среќна Нова '49 | Macedonian, Serbian | Stole Popov | Not nominated |
