= Waterborne =

Waterborne may refer to:

- Waterborne disease
- Waterborne (film), 2005 Indian American film
- Waterborne transport
