= My First Two Hundred Years =

1985 film

- Directed by: Gyula Maár
- Written by: Gyula Maár; Pál Királyhegyi
- Produced by: József Bajusz
- Starring: Zoltán Bezerédi
- Cinematography: Iván Márk
- Edited by: Júlia Sívó
- Release date: 1985
- Running time: 104 minutes
- Country: Hungary
- Language: Hungarian

My First Two Hundred Years (Hungarian: Első kétszáz évem) is a 1985 Hungarian drama film directed by Gyula Maár. It was entered into the 36th Berlin International Film Festival.

== Cast ==
- Zoltán Bezerédi as Pál Királyhegyi
- Anna Kubik as Maud
- László Márkus as Krausz
- Béla Both as Krausz
- Jiří Adamíra as Film producer
- Mari Törőcsik as A filmcézár felesége
- Ferenc Paláncz as Surányi testvér
- Gábor Nagy as Nyilas tiszt
- György Kézdy as Henrik
- László Csákányi as Kondor
- Kati Sír as Nyilas pártszolgálatosnő
- János Gálvölgyi as Német tiszt
- Gyula Benkő as Kegyelmes úr
- Endre Harkányi as Ernő
- Péter Andorai as Betörő
