= Tears of Stone =

Tears of Stone may refer to:

- Tears of Stone (album), Irish folk album by The Chieftains
- Tears of Stone (film), Icelandic film
