= List of submissions to the 64th Academy Awards for Best Foreign Language Film =

1991 Best Foreign Language Film submissions

Highlights
- Oscar winner: (Italy) Mediterraneo
- Submissions: 34
- Debuts: 1

This is a list of submissions to the 64th Academy Awards for Best Foreign Language Film. The Academy Award for Best Foreign Language Film was created in 1956 by the Academy of Motion Picture Arts and Sciences to honour non-English-speaking films produced outside the United States. The award is handed out annually, and is accepted by the winning film's director, although it is considered an award for the submitting country as a whole. Countries are invited by the Academy to submit their best films for competition according to strict rules, with only one film being accepted from each country.

For the 64th Academy Awards, thirty-four films were submitted in the category Academy Award for Best Foreign Language Film. The five nominated films came from Czechoslovakia, Hong Kong, Iceland, Sweden and Italy. Hong Kong and Iceland received their first-ever nominations, while Czechoslovakia received its final nomination as a unified state.

Italy won the award for the twelfth time with Mediterraneo by Gabriele Salvatores.

== Submissions ==
Submitting country	Film title used in nomination	Original title	Language(s)	Director(s)	Result
Algeria	Cheb		French, Arabic	Rachid Bouchareb	Not nominated
Argentina	The Tombs	Las tumbas	Spanish	Javier Torre	Not nominated
Armenia	The Voice in the Wilderness		Armenian	Vigen Chaldranyan	Not on the final list
Austria	I Love Vienna		German, English, Italian, Polish, Persian, Arabic	Houchang Allahyari	Not nominated
Belgium	Toto the Hero	Toto le héros	French	Jaco Van Dormael	Not nominated
Brazil	Exposure	A Grande Arte	Brazilian Portuguese, English, Spanish	Walter Salles	Not nominated
Bulgaria	The Well	Кладенецът	Bulgarian	Docho Bodzhakov	Not nominated
Canada	A Bullet in the Head		Fictional Language	Attila Bertalan	Not nominated
Chile	La Frontera		Spanish	Ricardo Larraín	Not nominated
China	The Spring Festival	过年	Mandarin	Huang Jianzhong	Not nominated
Colombia	Confessing to Laura	Confesión a Laura	Spanish	Jaime Osorio Gómez	Not nominated
Cuba	Hello Hemingway		Spanish	Fernando Perez	Not nominated
Czechoslovakia	The Elementary School	Obecná skola	Czech	Jan Svěrák	Nominated
Croatia	Fragments: Chronicle of a Vanishing		Croatian	Zrinko Ogresta	Not on the final list
Denmark	The Great Day on the Beach	Den store badedag	Danish	Stellan Olsson	Not nominated
France	Van Gogh		French	Maurice Pialat	Not nominated
Hong Kong	Raise the Red Lantern	大紅燈籠高高掛	Mandarin	Zhang Yimou	Nominated
Hungary	Brats	Félálom	Hungarian	János Rózsa	Not nominated
Iceland	Children of Nature	Börn náttúrunnar	Icelandic, English	Friðrik Þór Friðriksson	Nominated
India	Henna	हिना	Hindi, Urdu	Randhir Kapoor	Not nominated
Israel	Beyond the Sea	מעבר לים	Hebrew	Jacob Goldwasser	Not nominated
Italy	Mediterraneo		Italian, English, Greek	Gabriele Salvatores	Won Academy Award
Japan	Rhapsody in August	八月の狂詩曲	Japanese	Akira Kurosawa	Not nominated
Mexico	Homework	La tarea	Spanish	Jaime Humberto Hermosillo	Not nominated
Netherlands	Eline Vere		Dutch	Harry Kümel	Not nominated
Norway	Frida – Straight from the Heart	Frida - med hjertet i hånden	Norwegian	Berit Nesheim	Not nominated
Peru	Alias 'La Gringa'		Spanish	Alberto Durant	Not nominated
Poland	The Double Life of Véronique	Podwójne życie Weroniki	Polish, French	Krzysztof Kieślowski	Not nominated
Portugal	O Sangue	O Sangue	Portuguese	Pedro Costa	Not nominated
Soviet Union	Get Thee Out	Изыди!	Russian	Dmitriy Astrakhan	Not nominated
Spain	High Heels	Tacones lejanos	Spanish	Pedro Almodóvar	Not nominated
Sweden	The Ox	Oxen	Swedish	Sven Nykvist	Nominated
Switzerland	Der Berg	Der Berg	Swiss German	Markus Imhoof	Not nominated
Taiwan	A Brighter Summer Day	牯嶺街少年殺人事件	Mandarin, Shanghainese, Taiwanese Hokkien	Edward Yang	Not nominated
United Kingdom	Lost in Siberia	Затерянный в Сибири	Russian	Alexander Mitta	Not nominated
Venezuela	Jericho	Jericó	Spanish	Luis Alberto Lamata	Not nominated
Yugoslavia	The Original of the Forgery	Оригинал фалсификата	Serbian	Dragan Kresoja	Not nominated

== Notes ==
- Germany caused controversy when it took the unusual step not to submit any film to the competition. Europa, Europa by Agnieszka Holland was one of the pre-selection favorites to win the award. Although the film was made in German and about Germany, the country's National Film Board said that because they considered the film to be a majority-French production, and because the director was Polish, they did not consider it qualified to represent Germany. This is the only time since 1977 that Germany failed to be represented.
- In spite of a rule requiring films to be in the language of the submitting country, AMPAS decided to accept a submission from the United Kingdom that was mostly in Russian, marking the UK's first-ever participation in the competition.
- AMPAS acknowledged that they had received four submissions from new Eastern European republics, Armenia, Croatia, Macedonia and Slovenia, which had each declared independence in mid-to-late 1991. Since none of the countries had yet been recognized internationally, the films were disqualified and not screened, although representatives from their parent states - the USSR and Yugoslavia - were allowed to compete. AMPAS did not announce the titles, but based on the small size of these republic's film industries at the time it appears certain that Macedonia chose Stole Popov's Tetoviranje, the most celebrated Yugoslavian film of 1991, and that Croatia, Slovenia and Armenia likely chose family drama Fragments, black comedy The Cartier Operation and surreal religious drama The Voice in the Wilderness respectively.
- Other countries notable by their absence included Egypt, Finland, Greece and Romania.
