= The Ottoman Lieutenant =

- Directed by: Joseph Ruben
- Written by: Jeff Stockwell
- Produced by: Stephen Joel Brown
- Starring: Michiel Huisman; Hera Hilmar; Josh Hartnett; Ben Kingsley
- Cinematography: Daniel Aranyó
- Edited by: Nick Moore; Dennis Virkler
- Music by: Geoff Zanelli
- Production companies: Y Production; Eastern Sunrise Films
- Distributed by: Paladin
- Release date: March 10, 2017
- Running time: 106 minutes
- Countries: United States; Turkey
- Language: English
- Box office: $240,978

The Ottoman Lieutenant (Turkish: Osmanlı Subayı) is a Turkish-American romantic war drama film directed by Joseph Ruben and written by Jeff Stockwell. The film stars Michiel Huisman, Hera Hilmar, Josh Hartnett and Ben Kingsley. The film was released widely on March 10, 2017.

The film was released around the period of the film The Promise, a film depicting the Armenian genocide. The perceived similarities between the films resulted in accusations that The Ottoman Lieutenant existed to deny the Armenian genocide.

== Plot ==
The Ottoman Lieutenant is a love story between an idealistic American nurse, Lillie, and a Turkish officer during World War I. Lillie first travels to Istanbul before being escorted by Ismail to the region around Van.

== Cast ==
- Michiel Huisman as Ismail Veli, a lieutenant in the Ottoman Imperial Army
- Hera Hilmar as Lillie Rowe, an idealistic American nurse
- Josh Hartnett as Jude Gresham, an American doctor
- Ben Kingsley as Dr. Garrett Woodruff
- Haluk Bilginer as Halil Bey
- Peter Hosking

== Production ==
The motion picture commenced principal photography in Prague, Czech Republic in April 2015, and also filmed in Cappadocia and Istanbul, Turkey and completed filming in July 2015. The film's music score was composed by Geoff Zanelli. A 300,000-square-foot (28,000 m^{2}) parcel of land at Barrandov Studios in Prague was where most filming took place. The Ottoman Lieutenant entered into production before The Promise, which describes the Armenian genocide as a deliberate campaign of the Ottoman Empire. The Ottoman Lieutenant depicts the deaths of Armenians in the manner that the Turkish government stated had happened, that is, unorganized killings, instead of a planned genocide.

Cara Buckley of The New York Times stated that "several people familiar with" the production indicated that the producers in Turkey, unbeknownst to the director, had arranged for the final cut, and due to the post-production removal of dialog related to the Armenian genocide, "Several people who worked on the project felt the final version butchered the film artistically, and smacked of denialism". Director Joseph Ruben, unsatisfied with post-production changes, did not promote the film, but was contractually required to keep his name in the credits.

The production team of The Ottoman Lieutenant asked Project Save, an archive of Armenian photographs based in the United States, for permission to use some of the photographs. Project Save researched the producers and declined to license the photographs because the producers of the film received financial support from Turkey.

== Reception and release ==
The film's release date changed as the release date of The Promise changed, and internet users stated that this was a campaign from the producers of The Ottoman Lieutenant to influence Americans. Terry George, who directed The Promise, stated that the publicity material for the films was similar; there were accusations, from George and The Promise producer Eric Esrailian, that the film was created solely to counter The Promise.

Its Turkish release was scheduled for May 19, 2017. By May 30 of that year, 41,578 people in Turkey viewed the film, a figure that lead Riada Asimovic Aykol of Al Monitor to conclude that The Ottoman Lieutenant had "not done well". The Turkish version of the film added censorship against the kissing scene.

Los Angeles was scheduled as the North American premiere site. In the United States the film's revenue was fewer than $250,000 by April 2017. Alex Ritman and Mia Galuppo of The Hollywood Reporter stated that The Ottoman Lieutenant "didn't have much impact at the box office" stateside.

The film later aired on Turkish TV channels and on the in-flight entertainment systems of Turkish Airlines.

=== Reception ===
The Ottoman Lieutenant was panned by film critics. On review aggregator Rotten Tomatoes, the film holds an approval rating of 19%, with an average rating of 3.8/10 based on reviews from 36 critics. On Metacritic the film has a score of 26 out of 100, based on reviews from 13 critics.

Especially in the West, several critics criticized the film for perpetuating the denial of the Armenian genocide. In his review for Variety Dennis Harvey writes, "[In] this primarily Turkish-funded production, the historical, political, ethnic and other intricacies — not to mention that perpetual elephant in the room, the Armenian Genocide, which commenced in 1915 — are glossed over in favor of a generalized 'Whattaya gonna do… war is bad' aura that implies conscience without actually saying anything."

In his review of the film for Slant Magazine, Keith Watson writes, "More conspicuous than The Ottoman Lieutenant's rote melodrama is the way the film elides the concurrent genocide of ethnic Armenians by Ottoman forces, a historical reality which the Turkish government continues to deny to this day." Critic Roger Moore called The Ottoman Lieutenant "a botched love-triangle romance set against a revisionist account of the Turkish Armenian Genocide."

On March 7, 2017, the Armenian Youth Federation Western United States issued a statement, urging the public not to watch the film in theaters or support it in any way. “[We] do feel it is important for our community to be aware of the fact that genocide denial is present and still a major issue, even outside of the Republic of Turkey,” read a part of the statement. The American Hellenic Council accused the film of being made as a rival of The Promise and argued for boycotting The Ottoman Lieutenant.

Michael Daly of The Daily Beast contrasted the film with The Promise, which he said does express the truth about the Armenian genocide. Buckley wrote that, due to similarities of some plot points, The Ottoman Lieutenant had "uncanny parallels" to The Promise.

The film's reception in Turkey varied, with some being critical, and those in favor of the Turkish government praising the film. Turkish film critic Atilla Dorsay gave approval to the film overall, stating that it mainly reflected the Turkish point of view while being "impartial and honest, without maligning any particular camp and leaving little room for objection", but criticized a scene lacking emphasis of the Cathedral of the Holy Cross, Aghtamar, stating that it could have shown Christian audiences the Ottomans' relative religious tolerance.

== Accuracy ==
The city of Istanbul is called as such in the movie, though at the time the English name for the entire city was Constantinople, while the central portion was known as "Stamboul".

== See also ==
Other productions by Eastern Sunrise Films:

- Payitaht: Abdülhamid
- Filinta
- İsimsizler

Other topics:

- Names of Istanbul
