= Anne Krigsvoll =

Norwegian actress (born 1957)

- Born: Anne Katharine Krigsvoll; 4 February 1957 (age 69); Trondheim, Norway
- Occupation: Actress
- Years active: 1982 – present
- Awards: Amanda Award 1988, "Best actress"

Anne Katharine Krigsvoll (born 4 February 1957) is a Norwegian actress. She debuted at Nationaltheatret (the National Theatre) in 1982, and has worked there since. Here she has had roles such as "Shui Ta" in Brecht's The Good Person of Sezuan, and "Dorine" in Molière's Tartuffe. In 2002 she also had great success as "Martha" in Edward Albee's Who's Afraid of Virginia Woolf?. Krigsvoll has also worked in film and television, and in 1988 won the Amanda Award for her role in the TV-series Av måneskinn gror det ingenting. She has been married four times.

== Select filmography ==
- On the Threshold (1984)
- Av måneskinn gror det ingenting (TV, 1987)
- Brun bitter (1988)
- For dagene er onde (1991)
- Vestavind (TV, 1994)
- Brødrene Dal og legenden om Atlant-Is (TV, 1994)
- Aldri mer 13! (1996)
- Offshore (TV, 1996)
- Uro (2006)
- Berlinerpoplene (TV, 2007)
- Lilyhammer (TV, 2012)
