= Love, Mother =

1987 film

- Directed by: János Rózsa
- Written by: Miklós Vámos
- Starring: Dorottya Udvaros
- Cinematography: Elemér Ragályi
- Release date: 12 March 1987
- Running time: 103 minutes
- Country: Hungary
- Language: Hungarian

Love, Mother (Hungarian: Csók, Anyu!) is a 1987 Hungarian drama film directed by János Rózsa. It was entered into the 15th Moscow International Film Festival where Dorottya Udvaros won the award for Best Actress.

== Cast ==
- Dorottya Udvaros as Kalmár Juli
- Róbert Koltai as Kalmár Géza
- Sándor Gáspár as Doki
- Kati Lajtai as Kalmár Mari
- Simon Gévai as Peti Kalmár (as Gévai G. Simon)
- Péter Andorai as Csezmiczey
- Ildikó Bánsági as Osztályfõnökn&otilde
- Erika Bodnár as Szomszédasszony
- Zsuzsa Töreky as Szeretõ
- Judit Pogány as Vendég asszony
- Frigyes Hollósi as Vendég férfi
