= The Oath (2016 film) =

2016 film

- Film poster
- Directed by: Baltasar Kormákur
- Written by: Ólafur Egilsson; Baltasar Kormákur
- Produced by: Magnús Viðar Sigurðsson; Baltasar Kormákur
- Starring: Baltasar Kormákur
- Cinematography: Óttar Guðnason
- Edited by: Sigvaldi J. Kárason
- Music by: Hildur Guðnadóttir
- Distributed by: RVK Studios
- Release date: 6 September 2016
- Running time: 103 minutes
- Country: Iceland
- Language: Icelandic
- Box office: $568,619 (domestic)

The Oath (Icelandic: Eiðurinn) is a 2016 Icelandic thriller film written by Ólafur Egill Egilsson, and co-written and directed by Baltasar Kormákur, who also plays the leading role. It was screened in the Special Presentations section at the 2016 Toronto International Film Festival. It was the most popular movie in Icelandic theaters in 2016.

== Plot ==
Finnur is a surgeon who is worried about his eldest daughter, Anna. Anna has been involved with drugs and Finnur is made aware that Anna's boyfriend Óttar is a drug dealer. Thinking he is a bad influence on Anna, Finnur tries to break up the relationship. But neither Anna nor Óttar has any intention in doing so and Óttar becomes threatening due to Finnur's incursions on their private life. After Finnur's workmate Halldór shows him a victim of a shooting, Finnur starts to plan for Óttar's disappearance. Finnur carries out his plan, but it goes wrong, ending with Finnur trying to revive dead Óttar in the hospital. The police think Finnur killed him, but have to let him go for lack of evidence. Unfortunately for Finnur, his daughter deduces that Finnur was with Óttar shortly before his death.

== Cast ==
- Baltasar Kormákur as Finnur
- Hera Hilmar as Anna
- Gísli Örn Garðarsson as Óttar
- Ingvar Eggert Sigurðsson as Halldór
- Þorsteinn Bachmann as Ragnar

== Reception ==
On review aggregator website Rotten Tomatoes, the film holds a 75% approval rating, based on 16 reviews with an average rating of 7/10.

Adam Graham of Detroit News had compared the film to Fear and Taken, and praised Kormákur for setting "[an] icy tone from the beginning".

Matthew Lickona of San Diego Reader jokingly have said that "[The Oath] is [a]n anti-Taken, though definitely not a Given", adding in his closing comments that "Everyone gets sympathy; no one gets excused".

Michael McNeely of That Shelf (formerly The Hindu Business Line), compared the film to Graduation and The Unknown Woman, but said that "unlike The Unknown Woman, the investigation is fast-paced and the results are found quickly".

Brent McKnight of Seattle Times had commented on film's "escalating psychological tension", adding that it "eschews the action trappings for delicate character work".

According to Laura DeMarco of The Plain Dealer, "[the film] is a philosophical drama that asks is it right for a father to go to such lengths".

Unlike other critics, Chicago Reader's Ben Sachs found the film "ugly and misanthropic".
