= Hard Asphalt =

Hard asfalt
- Directed by: Sølve Skagen
- Produced by: John M. Jacobsen
- Starring: Kristin Kajander; Frank Krog
- Release date: 1 October 1986
- Running time: 109 minutes
- Country: Norway
- Language: Norwegian
- Box office: $1.4 million (Norway)

Hard Asphalt (Norwegian: Hard asfalt) is a 1986 Norwegian drama film directed by Sølve Skagen. It was entered into the 15th Moscow International Film Festival. The film was selected as the Norwegian entry for the Best Foreign Language Film at the 59th Academy Awards, but was not accepted as a nominee. It was the highest-grossing Norwegian film of the year.

== Cast ==
- Kristin Kajander as Ida
- Frank Krog as Knut
- Marianne Nielsen as Åse
- Morten Faldaas as Bønna
- Liv Heløe as May-Britt
- Tone Schwarzott as Idas mor
- Tom Tellefsen as Idas far
- Svein Erik Brodal as Herr Abrahamsen
- Gudrun Waadeland as Fru Abrahamsen
- Sigve Bøe as Nordlie
- Anne Marit Jacobsen as Dagmamma
- Bernhard Ramstad as Kaspersen

== See also ==
- List of submissions to the 59th Academy Awards for Best Foreign Language Film
- List of Norwegian submissions for the Academy Award for Best Foreign Language Film
