= The Tombs (film) =

1991 film

- Directed by: Javier Torre
- Written by: Javier Torre
- Starring: Norma Aleandro
- Edited by: Juan Carlos Macías
- Release date: 8 August 1991
- Running time: 90 minutes
- Country: Argentina
- Language: Spanish

The Tombs (Spanish: Las tumbas) is a 1991 Argentine drama film directed by Javier Torre. The film was selected as the Argentine entry for the Best Foreign Language Film at the 64th Academy Awards, but was not accepted as a nominee.

== Cast ==
- Norma Aleandro as Maria
- Federico Luppi as Espiga
- Jorge Mayor as La Gaita
- Isabel Quinteros as Rosita
- Lidia Catalano as Sara
- Sara Benítez as Gaucha
- Miguel Dedovich as Padre Roque
- Pompeyo Audivert as Remolacha

== See also ==
- List of submissions to the 64th Academy Awards for Best Foreign Language Film
- List of Argentine submissions for the Academy Award for Best Foreign Language Film
