= Sølve Skagen =

Norwegian film director (born 1945)

- Born: 17 February 1945 (age 81); Norway
- Occupation: Film director
- Years active: 1975-1993

Sølve Skagen (born 17 February 1945) is a Norwegian film director. He was born in Eid Municipality in Sogn og Fjordane county. He is related to Kaj Skagen. Among his films are Hard asfalt from 1986 and Brun bitter from 1988. Hard asfalt was Norway's submission for the 59th Academy Award for Best Foreign Language Film, and it was later entered into the 15th Moscow International Film Festival.
