= The Ashram (film) =

- Poster
- Directed by: Ben Rekhi
- Screenplay by: Ben Rekhi; Binky Mendez
- Produced by: Ben Rekhi; Guneet Monga; Achin Jain
- Starring: Sam Keeley; Hera Hilmar; Radhika Apte; Suhas Joshi; Kal Penn; Melissa Leo; Manoel Orfanaki
- Cinematography: Nikos Andritsakis
- Production company: Sikhya Entertainment
- Distributed by: IM Global
- Release dates: 2 March 2018 (Cinequest Festival); 27 March 2018 (VOD)
- Countries: United States; India
- Language: English

The Ashram is a 2018 fantasy thriller film directed by Ben Rekhi and written by Rekhi and Binky Mendez. It stars Sam Keeley, Hera Hilmar, Kal Penn, Melissa Leo and Radhika Apte.

== Cast ==
- Sam Keeley as Jamie
- Hera Hilmar as Sophie
- Kal Penn as Nitin
- Melissa Leo as Chandra
- Radhika Apte as Gayatri
- Suhas Joshi as Guruji

== Locations ==
The movie was shot at the Kedarnath Shrine and at several locations in the Himalayas.
