= Inga Lísa Middleton =

Icelandic filmmaker / photographer

- Born: December 9, 1964 (age 61); Reykjavík, Iceland
- Education: Surrey Institute of Art & Design, University College Royal College of Art
- Occupations: Photographer, film director, screenwriter, animator
- Known for: Experimental photography
- Website: https://www.ingalisamiddleton.com/

Inga Lísa Middleton (born December 9, 1964) is an Icelandic photographer and film maker recently specialising in producing her photographs as cyanotype prints. She has also directed several films, such as the anthology Comedy drama Dramarama, and the short film Búi, which won the short film award at the SCHLINGEL International Film Festival. Her photographs have gone on to be shown in Iceland, Denmark, Japan and the United Kingdom.

== Education ==
Inga Lísa Middleton was born in Reykjavík, Iceland, and performed her Icelandic University Entrance Exam at Menntaskólinn við Sund. Moving from Iceland to the United Kingdom in 1985, she gained an art foundation diploma after studying a year course at Sunderland Polytechnic. Middleton then enrolled at West Surrey College of Art and Design, Farnham, where she studied for three years and graduated with a BA in photography, film/video and animation. It was during this time where she created her first animated short film, Mommy, Daddy, Bobby and Debby, of which was sold off to the British television channel, Channel 4.

After university, she went on to complete a two-year postgraduate course at the Royal College of Art in London, England. Here, in 1992, she graduated with an MA in visual communication. It would be the same year that Middleton would go on to direct and write the animated short film A Fairy Tale of Our Time. The short received critical acclaim and was later nominated for best short film at the 46th annual Cannes Film Festival.

== Photography ==
In 2017, Middleton showed off her first photograph exhibition, titled Thoughts of Home, a series of cyanotype prints documenting the wildlife and natural environments of Iceland. The project was first exhibited at the Icelandic Embassy in Copenhagen, Denmark, and the National Museum of Iceland in Reykjavík, Iceland. One year later, Thoughts of Home, went on to be exhibited at the Icelandic Embassy in London, England, and at the annual Photo London event, held inside Somerset House, London. Middleton notes her inspiration for Thoughts of Home as being, both, her nostalgia for growing up in Iceland, while also the pairing of the beauty in nature and practical efficient undertones. 2018 also saw the reveal of Middleton's second art project, Tip of the Iceberg; cyanotype prints of icebergs, with only the iceberg's tip not submerged under water.

Phytoplankton, her most recent project, was first revealed at Photo London, in 2019. Middleton was inspired to pursue this project was by through how unicellular organisms, known as phytoplankton, are being destroyed by microplastics, even though they are vital to keeping the humans alive by producing the majority of the atmosphere's oxygen. She has also gone on record as being influenced by the work of Carl Jung, specifically his book Man and His Symbols. The works has been shown at PhotoLondon 2019 and at the Icelandic Embassy in Tokyo, Japan.

== Filmography^{a} ==
Year	Title	Director	Screenwriter	Producer	Script supervisor	Still photographer
1992	A Fairy Tale of Our Time	Yes	Yes	No	No	No
1994	Movie Days	No	No	No	No	Yes
1995	Tears of Stone	No	No	No	Yes	Yes
1995	Cold Fever	No	No	No	Yes	Yes
1995	When Dreams Come True	Yes	Yes	No	No	No
1996	Devil's Island	No	No	No	Yes	No
1998	Slurpinn & Co.	No	No	No	No	Yes
2001	Dramarama	Yes	No	No	No	Yes
2005	Galdrabókin	Yes	Yes	No	No	No
2016	Búi	Yes	Yes	No	No	No
2020	The Wish	Yes	Yes	No	No	No

== Exhibitions ==
- Thoughts of Home (2017) – Embassy of Iceland – Copenhagen, Denmark
- Thoughts of Home (2017) – National Museum of Iceland – Reykjavik, Iceland
- Thoughts of Home (2018) – Embassy of Iceland – London, United Kingdom
- Tip of the Iceberg & Thoughts of Home (2018) – London, United Kingdom
- Phytoplankton (2019) – Photo London – London, United Kingdom
- Megaptera (2021) – Photo London – London, United Kingdom
- Phytoplankton (2021-23) – Embassy of Iceland – Tokyo, Japan
- Icons of the Oceand (2022) – Photo London – London, United Kingdom
- Solo show (2022-23) – L'Atelier D'Artistes – Paris, France
- Oceans in the age of humans (2023) – Arctic Circle Japan Forum – Tokyo, Japan
- Oceans in the age of humans (2023) – Akureyri Art museum – Akureyri, Iceland
- Phytoplankton (2024-2025) – The Box - Plymouth Art Centre, United Kingdom
- Group show (2022-23) – L'Atelier D'Artistes – Paris, France

== Notes ==
_{a.Filmography gathered from the Icelandic Film Centre}
