= Ben Rekhi =

American director

- Born: Mountain View, CA, US
- Occupations: Director, producer, screenwriter
- Years active: 1999–present

Ben Rekhi is an American director, producer, and screenwriter. He is known for Waterborne (2005), Fun Size Horror: Volume One (2015), and The Ashram (2018).

== Career ==
Rekhi has worked on the set of O Brother, Where Art Thou? and shot the behind-the-scenes documentary for Confessions of a Dangerous Mind. He founded Drops Entertainment and produced his first feature film, Bomb the System, which was nominated for the 2004 Independent Spirit Award for Best First Feature and distributed by Palm Pictures. His directorial debut, Waterborne, was the runner-up for the narrative audience prize at the 2005 SXSW Film Festival, and Car Babes, which he produced, premiered at the Hollywood Film Festival.

Rekhi also served as VP of Acquisitions at Apsara Distribution. Apsara obtained exclusive Asia distribution rights to Harrison Ford's Paranoia.

Rekhi directed The Ashram (2016) in India, featuring Sam Keeley, Kal Penn, Melissa Leo, and Radhika Apte.

In 2019, he directed Watch List (Maria) in Manila, a crime thriller set in the drug underworld during the time of Rodrigo Duterte's extrajudicial killings. The film was nominated for a Jury Prize at the Seattle International Film Festival.
