= The Swan (novel) =

1991 novel by Guðbergur Bergsson

The Swan (orig. Icelandic Svanurinn) is a novel written by the Icelandic writer Guðbergur Bergsson in 1991.

== Plot introduction ==
The story is about a nine-year-old girl sent to a country farm in Iceland to serve her probation for shoplifting (which is a characteristic Icelandic sentence). In the novel, the girl finds a kind of freedom by submitting to the inevitable restraints and suffering of remote rural life. She develops a bond with the farmhand, who writes a diary in the evenings. Things are disrupted when the farmer's daughter returns from university unexpectedly.

== Awards and nominations ==
- In 1991, Guðbergur Bergsson got the Icelandic Literary Prize for his novel, Svanurinn.
- In 1992, Svanurinn was nominated for the Literary Prize of the Nordic Council.

== Translation ==
- This is one of the few novels by Guðbergur Bergsson that are available in English. The English version is translated by Bernard Scudder, a member of the team producing an English translation of the Icelandic Sagas.

== Adaptation ==
In 2017, the Icelandic film director Ása Helga Hjörleifsdóttir shot her first movie The Swan, the adaptation of The Swan.
