= Driving Mum =

2022 Icelandic film

- Directed by: Hilmar Oddsson
- Written by: Hilmar Oddsson
- Produced by: Hlín Jóhannesdóttir
- Starring: Þröstur Leó Gunnarsson; Kristbjörg Kjeld; Hera Hilmar
- Cinematography: Óttar Guðnason
- Edited by: Hendrik Mägar
- Music by: Tõnu Kõrvits
- Production companies: Alexandra Films S.A.; Icelandic Film Center; Ursus Parvus
- Distributed by: Prokino Filmverleih
- Release dates: February 24, 2022 (Sambíó); November 19, 2022 (Tallinn)
- Running time: 112 minutes
- Countries: Iceland, Estonia
- Language: Icelandic

Driving Mum (Icelandic: Á Ferð með Mömmu) is a 2022 comedy drama film written and directed by Hilmar Oddsson that stars Þröstur Leó Gunnarsson, Kristbjörg Kjeld, and Hera Hilmar. Driving Mum is shot in black-and-white.

== Plot summary ==
Set in 1980, after the sudden passing of his mother (Kristbjörg Kjeld), Jón (Þröstur Leó Gunnarsson) takes his mother's corpse, a 35 mm camera, and the family dog, Bresnef, on one last trip to Eyrarbakki to bury her, as her instructions. Jón also never recovered from his girlfriend running away many years before. Along the trip, he tries to find his ex, and learns what happened to her. Enraged, he sets fire to the car (his mother did not want to be cremated). For that, he goes to prison.

== Cast ==
- Þröstur Leó Gunnarsson as Jón
- Kristbjörg Kjeld as Mamma, Jón's late mother
- Hera Hilmar as Bergdís
- Tómas Lemarquis as Hitchhiker
- Harpa Arnardóttir as farmer
- Kjartan Bjargmundsson as farmer
- Þorsteinn Gunnar Bjarnason as prisoner
- Arnmundur Ernst Björnsson as Theatre Group Member
- Pétur Eggerz as prisoner
- Ásgrímur Egilsson as prisoner
- Alexander Dantes Erlendsson as prison guard
- Pálmi Gestsson
- Einar Gunn as funeral director
- Halldór Gylfason as prison guard
- Kolbrun Halldórsdóttir as Theatre Group Member
- Jóhann Sigurðsson as warden
- Steiney Skúladóttir
- Björn Stefánsson as angry driver

== Release ==
Driving Mum won the Grand Prix Prize for Best Film at the Tallinn Black Night Film Festival and was also an Industry Select title at the 2022 Toronto International Film Festival.

Sena distributed Driving Mum in Iceland.

Prokino Filmverleih helped to distribute German-language dubs and got Swiss rights for Driving Mum from Alief.

== Reception ==
Wendy Ide of ScreenDaily praised the film, stating that it was, "a road movie from beyond - or before - the grave"

Amber Wilkinson of Eye For Film praised the soundtrack and cinematography and also interviewed Hilmar Oddsson who said, "I used one of these old compositions, which we tried by coincidence in one driving scene, it’s cello and choral voices. It’s so beautiful and he liked that piece himself in that spot. But it was something he had already recorded and published.”

Hungarian director Ildikó Enyedi, said that "Driving Mum charmed us all with its transparent, simple, but bold film language, with its graceful sense of humour, with its unpretentious way of speaking about burning questions of personal life. A film which tells us that it is never too late."

Producer Hlin Johannesdottir stated that, "Both Hilmar Oddsson and myself feel delighted and honoured to have Driving Mum selected for the main competition at [the] Black Nights festival and to have its world premiere in Tallinn. We had Estonian talent involved in the production and this will be a perfect venue for the film to start its journey to the audiences."

Driving Mum won 9 awards at the 2024 Edda Awards:

- Film of the Year.
- Directing: Hilmar Oddsson.
- Screenplay: Hilmar Oddsson.
- Leading Actor: Þröstur Leó Gunnarsson.
- Leading Actress: Kristbjörg Kjeld.
- Cinematography: Óttar Guðnason.
- Costume Design: Helga Rós V. Hannam.
- Make-Up: Kristín Júlla Kristjánsdóttir.
- Original Score: Tõnu Kõrvits.
