= Zoltán Bezerédi =

Hungarian actor

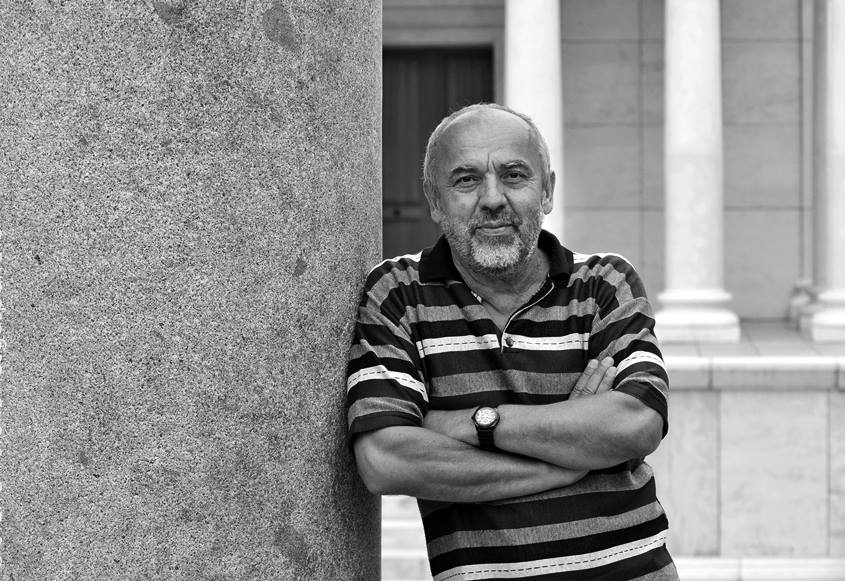
- Born: 18 July 1955 (age 70); Budapest, Hungary
- Occupation: Actor
- Years active: 1980–present

Zoltán Bezerédi (born 18 July 1955) is a Hungarian actor. He has appeared in 65 films and television shows since 1980. He starred in the 1985 film Elsö kétszáz évem, which was entered into the 36th Berlin International Film Festival.

== Selected filmography ==
- Bizalom (1980)
- Oh, Bloody Life (1984)
- Elsö kétszáz évem (1985)
- Out of Order (1997)
- Passion (1998)
- Perlasca – Un eroe Italiano (2002)
