= Dorottya Udvaros =

Hungarian actress (born 1954)

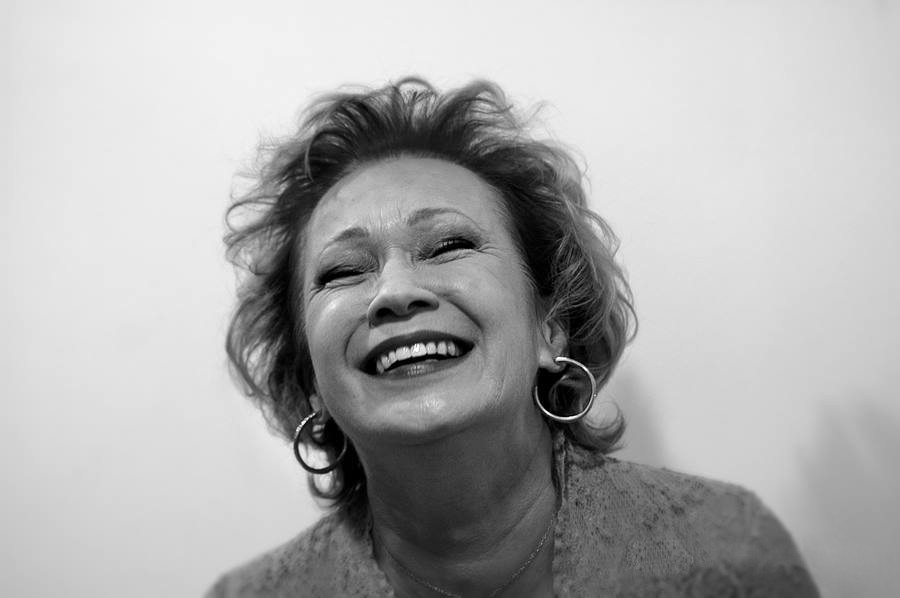
- Born: 4 August 1954 (age 72); Budapest, Hungary
- Occupation: Actress
- Years active: 1976–present

Dorottya Udvaros (born 4 August 1954) is a Hungarian actress. She has appeared in more than 60 films and television shows since 1976. She won the award for Best Actress at the 15th Moscow International Film Festival for her role in Love, Mother (1987).

== Early Life ==
Dorottya Udvaros grew up in an artistic family: her father, Béla Udvaros, was a theatre director, and her mother, Camilla Dévay, was an actress. She was introduced to the theatre at an early age and appeared on stage as a child.

== Education ==
In 1978, Udvaros graduated from the Academy of Drama and Film in Budapest with a degree in acting. During her studies, she received classical actor training.

== Career ==
After graduating, Udvaros joined the Szigligeti Theatre in Szolnok, where she spent three years. In 1981, she became a member of the National Theatre of Budapest.

In 1982, she became one of the founding members of the Katona József Theatre. She joined the Új Theatre (New Theatre) in 1994 and the Bárka Theatre in 1997. Since 2002, Udvaros has again been a member of the National Theatre.

Alongside her stage career, she has appeared in numerous films and television productions.

Throughout her career, Udvaros has received numerous prestigious awards. In 1983 she won the Jászai Mari Award; in 1990 she won the Kossuth Prize (1990); and in 2023 she was named Actor of the Nation.

She has lifetime membership in the Society of the Immortals (Halhatatlanok Társulata).

== Selected filmography ==
- Dögkeselyű (1982)
- Night Rehearsal (1983)
- Oh, Bloody Life (1984)
- Colonel Redl (1985)
- Love, Mother (1987)
- Miss Arizona (1987)
- Jesus Christ's Horoscope (1989)
- Meeting Venus (1991)
- Out of Order (1997)
- A mi kis falunk (TV series, 2017–)
- Terápia (In Treatment Hungarian version, Season 3, 2017)
- Zárójelentés (2020)
- Futni mentem (2024)

== Personal life ==
Udvaros has kept her private life largely out of the public eye. She never married, but was in a long-term relationship with actor László Széles. They have one son, Máté Gyöngyösi (born in 1986), who works as a stunt performer.
