= Burnt (film) =

2015 film by John Wells

- Theatrical release poster
- Directed by: John Wells
- Screenplay by: Steven Knight
- Story by: Michael Kalesniko
- Produced by: Stacey Sher; Erwin Stoff; John Wells
- Starring: Bradley Cooper; Sienna Miller; Omar Sy; Daniel Brühl; Riccardo Scamarcio; Sam Keeley; Alicia Vikander; Matthew Rhys; Lily James; Uma Thurman; Emma Thompson
- Cinematography: Adriano Goldman
- Edited by: Nick Moore
- Music by: Rob Simonsen
- Production companies: Shiny Penny Productions; 3 Arts Entertainment; Battle Mountain Films
- Distributed by: The Weinstein Company
- Release dates: October 22, 2015 (New York City premiere); October 30, 2015 (United States)
- Running time: 101 minutes
- Countries: United States; United Kingdom
- Languages: English; French
- Budget: $20 million
- Box office: $36.6 million

Burnt is a 2015 comedy-drama film directed by John Wells and written by Steven Knight, from a story by Michael Kalesniko. The film stars an ensemble cast including Bradley Cooper, Sienna Miller, Omar Sy, Daniel Brühl, Matthew Rhys, Riccardo Scamarcio, Alicia Vikander, Uma Thurman and Emma Thompson.

Two Michelin star-rated, temperamental chef Adam Jones, fights his way into working at a London restaurant after a three-year hiatus, demanding perfection from his staff to strive for a third star.

The film was released on October 30, 2015, by The Weinstein Company. It was not well received by critics and grossed $36.6 million.

== Plot ==
Once the chef at a high-class Parisian restaurant owned by his mentor Jean-Luc, Adam Jones' drug use and temperamental behavior destroyed his career and the restaurant. Exiling himself in New Orleans, he shucked a million oysters to sober up. Adam heads to London to start over and earn a third Michelin star.

Seeking former colleagues, Adam finds his mentor's maître d'hôtel, Tony Balerdi, now The Langham Hotel, London's manager. Checking in, Adam then visits his old friend Conti, noting the sous-chef Helene's talent, but she immediately dismisses him for his arrogance.

Former Paris colleague Michel, whose restaurant Adam had sabotaged out of envy, finds him. They scuffle, reconcile then Michel asks for a job. Going to long-standing rival Reece's cutting-edge eatery ends poorly. Discovering he is back in Europe, Adam's former drug dealer attempts to collect his outstanding debt.

Adam convinces famed restaurant critic Simone to dine at Tony's hotel. Realizing Adam set it up, Tony trepidaciously allows him to cook, fearing his kitchen's poor condition could justify Simone's shutting down his restaurant. Her favorable review convinces Tony to renovate the hotel's kitchen and hire Adam as head chef, under the condition that he subject himself to weekly drug testing with Tony's psychiatrist Dr. Rosshilde.

Adam agrees to the testing, although is disinterested in therapy, and throws himself into preparations for the grand opening. Another old friend Max joins Adam's team once released from prison. Helene rebuffs further job offers until Conti fires her and sends her to Adam's. She is irate, but Adam convinces her by tripling her salary.

Opening night is a disaster, so Adam furiously closes early. He publicly humiliates Helene, blaming her, being both verbally and physically aggressive, so she quits. Tony convinces her to return by doubling her salary, giving insight into Adam's behavior. To increase the restaurant's publicity, Adam makes a talk show appearance he had previously rejected.

At the second opening, the restaurant receives a positive review, enraging Reece. Adam's attitude improves, but he refuses to let Helene off for her daughter Lily's birthday. Later, he discovers Helene's daughter is there under Tony's supervision, so she is not alone on her birthday. Adam is upset, but later bakes Lily a birthday cake, impressing Helene.

With their reputation established, Adam focuses on the third Michelin star, while avoiding his drug dealer, although Tony offers to pay off his debt. Adam takes Helene to the reopening of Reece's restaurant. He and Reece are civil, but Adam is taken aback upon spotting his ex-girlfriend Anne Marie, Jean-Luc's daughter. She is surprisingly forgiving, although he abandoned her in Paris and missed her father's funeral.

The encounter unnerves Adam, causing him to relive his Paris failure. The next morning, Helene finds him at the fish market, where they kiss in the alley before returning to the restaurant. The drug dealer's thugs interrupt, taking Adam away. He returns that night during dinner service, beaten and bruised.

The maître d' Kaitlin warns that two Michelin reviewers have arrived, so Adam opts to cook, rather than go to the hospital. They send their meals back for being too spicy, and Michel reveals he sabotaged the sauce with cayenne pepper to avenge his lost restaurant before leaving.

Adam also leaves the restaurant, about to break. Wandering, he eventually arrives drunk at Reece's restaurant. Once inside, he breaks down emotionally. Reece soothes him, and they part on better terms in the morning. Adam attends an AA meeting, then returns to the hotel.

There, Adam learns Anne Marie has paid off his debt, she gives him her father's knives and her approval of Helene. Tony and Helene find him to reveal the two 'Michelin inspectors' were actually visiting businessmen. Grateful for the second chance, Adam kisses him.

Admitting his insecurities to Helene, she comforts Adam, telling him to trust his crew. Tending to his wounds, they kiss, their relationship rekindled. Adam returns to the kitchen to prepare for the Michelin inspectors' meals. When asked the plan, he insists the whole kitchen will decide together as a team. With Adam's new attitude fostering teamwork in the kitchen, the restaurant gains its third star. Adam later enjoys a family meal with the rest of the crew, which he had not done before.

== Cast ==
- Bradley Cooper as Adam Jones, a disgraced, two star Michelin chef who sets his sights on redeeming himself and earning his third Michelin star
- Sienna Miller as Helene Sweeney, a chef recruited by Jones to work at his restaurant
- Omar Sy as Michel, Jones's sous chef with a grudge against him
- Daniel Brühl as Tony Balerdi, owner of a two star Michelin restaurant and maitre'd, who has great affection for Jones
- Riccardo Scamarcio as Max, Jones's grillardin
- Sam Keeley as David, a young chef Jones recruits for his restaurant
- Alicia Vikander as Anne Marie, Jones's former girlfriend
- Matthew Rhys as Montgomery Reece, a three star Michelin chef and Jones's rival
- Uma Thurman as Simone, a popular food critic and friend of Jones
- Emma Thompson as Dr. Rosshilde, Jones's therapist
- Lily James as Sara, David's girlfriend
- Sarah Greene as Kaitlin, fine dining server of Balerdi's restaurant
- Henry Goodman as Conti
- Stephen Campbell Moore as Jack
- Lexie Benbow-Hart as Lily Sweeney, Helene's daughter
- Charlotte Hawkins as TV Presenter

Jamie Dornan played the part of Leon Sweeney but his scenes were deleted.

== Production ==
=== Development ===
An early version of the film was potentially set to be directed by David Fincher and star Keanu Reeves, though it never came to fruition. In 2013, John Wells was set to direct a cooking comedy film, then titled Chef, with Bradley Cooper signed to star as a former Paris chef, Adam Jones. Sienna Miller signed as lead actress.

Omar Sy, Jamie Dornan, Emma Thompson, Daniel Brühl, Alicia Vikander and Lily James were also set to star in the film. Dornan's appearance was later removed due to cuts and adjustments in the storyline and Lily James's role revealed to be a cameo. Dornan's scenes were added to the home release.

In July 2014, it was reported that the film's title had been changed from Chef to Adam Jones, to avoid confusion with Jon Favreau's film Chef. Uma Thurman joined the cast around this time. According to Deadline Hollywood, as of July 28, 2014, Weinstein was calling the film Untitled John Wells project, until they could decide on a better title. On August 7, 2014, Matthew Rhys was added to the cast, playing chef Jones's rival, Reece. In July 2015, it was announced that the film had been retitled Burnt.

The film was executive produced by celebrity chef Gordon Ramsay.

=== Filming ===
Principal photography on the film began July 23, 2014, in New Orleans, Louisiana, filming for two days. Production then moved to London and West London Film Studios.

=== Post-production ===
On October 2, 2014, Nick Moore was hired for the film editing job. During editing of the film, Jamie Dornan's scenes were cut from the finished version.

== Marketing ==
The first poster, with the new title Burnt, was released on August 7, 2015. Cooper introduced a sneak peek of the film on the Today show on August 10, 2015. The Weinstein Company released the teaser trailer on August 14, 2015. On September 21, 2015, the first international trailer was released. On September 28, 2015, producers released the first full-length trailer for the film and on October 29, 2015, released a clip featuring Vikander and Cooper online.

== Release ==
The film was scheduled to be released on October 2, 2015, but in July 2015, The Weinstein Company moved the release date to October 23, 2015. The plan then was to give the film a limited release on October 23, 2015, before a wide release on October 30, 2015. However, they cancelled the limited release plan and immediately released the film nationwide, on October 30, 2015.

== Reception ==
=== Box office ===
Burnt grossed $13.7 million in the United States, and $23 million in other territories, for a worldwide total of $36.6 million, against a budget of $20 million.

The film opened on October 30, 2015, alongside Our Brand Is Crisis and Scouts Guide to the Zombie Apocalypse, was projected to gross $7–9 million from 3,003 theaters in its opening weekend. However, it only ended up grossing $5 million, finishing sixth at the box office, and marking the second straight underperforming opener for Cooper, following Aloha ($9.7 million opening against its $37 million budget). In it second weekend the film made $2.9 million, finishing seventh.

=== Critical response ===
Burnt received negative reviews from critics, who praised Cooper's performance but derided the script and storytelling. On Rotten Tomatoes, the film holds a rating of 29%, based on 159 reviews, with an average rating of 5.00/10. The site's critical consensus reads, "Burnt offers a few spoonfuls of compelling culinary drama, but they're lost in a watery goulash dominated by an unsavory main character and overdone clichés." On Metacritic, the film has a score of 42 out of 100, based on 28 critics, indicating "mixed or average" reviews. Audiences polled by CinemaScore gave the film an average grade of "B−" on an A+ to F scale.

Justin Chang of Variety praised Cooper's performance but was critical of the script: "Steven Knight’s script pours on the acid but holds the depth, forcing its fine actors (including Sienna Miller and Daniel Bruhl) to function less as an ensemble than as a motley sort of intervention group."
