= Oh, Bloody Life =

1984 film

- Directed by: Péter Bacsó
- Starring: Dorottya Udvaros; Zoltán Bezerédi
- Release date: 16 February 1984
- Running time: 108 minutes
- Country: Hungary
- Language: Hungarian

Oh, Bloody Life (Hungarian: Te rongyos élet) is a 1984 Hungarian comedy film directed by Péter Bacsó. It was inspired by the actress Sári Déry.

== Cast ==
- Dorottya Udvaros - Sziráky Lucy
- Zoltán Bezerédi - Matura Sándor rendõrszázados
- András Kern - Guthy Róbert - rendezõ
- Ödön Rubold - Báró Samoday Kornél
- Margit Lukács - Grófnő
- Ida Turay - Grófnő
- László Szacsvay - Kiptár József - tanító és párttitkár
- Lajos Őze - Zimányi - fõszerkesztõ
