= The Well (1991 film) =

1991 film

- Directed by: Docho Bodzhakov
- Written by: Docho Bodzhakov
- Starring: Lyuben Chatalov
- Release date: 16 September 1991
- Running time: 130 minutes
- Country: Bulgaria
- Language: Bulgarian

The Well (Bulgarian: Kladenetzat) is a 1991 Bulgarian drama film directed by Docho Bodzhakov. The film was selected as the Bulgarian entry for the Best Foreign Language Film at the 64th Academy Awards, but was not accepted as a nominee.

== Cast ==
- Lyuben Chatalov as Bashtata
- Vania Tzvetkova as Uchitelkata / Dariya
- Petar Popyordanov as Sinat
- Boyan Kovachev as Sinat kato malak
- Daniela Vasileva as Dariya kato malka

== See also ==
- List of submissions to the 64th Academy Awards for Best Foreign Language Film
- List of Bulgarian submissions for the Academy Award for Best Foreign Language Film
