= Echo (2019 film) =

2019 film

- Film poster
- Icelandic: Bergmál
- Directed by: Rúnar Rúnarsson
- Screenplay by: Rúnar Rúnarsson
- Produced by: Live Hide; Lilja Ósk Snorradóttir; Rúnar Rúnarsson
- Edited by: Jacob Schulsinger
- Music by: Kjartan Sveinsson
- Release dates: 11 August 2019 (Locarno); 20 November 2019 (Iceland)
- Running time: 79 minutes
- Country: Iceland
- Language: Icelandic

Echo (Icelandic: Bergmál) is an Icelandic film from 2019, directed by Rúnar Rúnarsson.

Over a series of 56 vignettes, Echo draws a portrait of Iceland during the Christmas holidays.

Echo was nominated for Best Film at the Edda Awards, won Best Original Score at Les Arcs Film Festival, and Best Director at the Valladolid International Film Festival.
