= Land and Sons =

1980 film

- Directed by: Ágúst Guðmundsson
- Written by: Indriði G. Þorsteinsson; Ágúst Guðmundsson
- Produced by: Jón Hermannsson
- Starring: Sigurður Sigurjónsson
- Cinematography: Sigurður Sverrir Pálsson
- Release date: 25 January 1980
- Running time: 91 minutes
- Country: Iceland
- Language: Icelandic

Land and Sons (Icelandic: Land og synir) is a 1980 Icelandic drama film directed by Ágúst Guðmundsson. The film was selected as the Icelandic entry for the Best Foreign Language Film at the 53rd Academy Awards, but was not accepted as a nominee.

== Cast ==
- Sigurður Sigurjónsson as Einar
- Jón Sigurbjörnsson as Tómas
- Jónas Tryggvason as Ólafur
- Guðný Ragnarsdóttir as Margrét
- Sigríður Hafstað as Móðir Margrétar
- Þorvarður Helgason as Örlygur
- Haukur Þorsteinsson as Mjólkurbílstjóri
- Kristján Skarphéðinsson as Hreppstjóri
- Magnús Ólafsson as Kaupfélagsstjóri

== See also ==
- List of submissions to the 53rd Academy Awards for Best Foreign Language Film
- List of Icelandic submissions for the Academy Award for Best Foreign Language Film
