= The Beast (1986 film) =

1986 film

- Directed by: Hilmar Oddsson
- Written by: Hilmar Oddsson
- Starring: Edda Heiðrún Backman
- Release date: 22 March 1986
- Running time: 97 minutes
- Country: Iceland
- Language: Icelandic

The Beast (Icelandic: Eins og skepnan deyr) is a 1986 Icelandic drama film directed by Hilmar Oddsson. The film was selected as the Icelandic entry for the Best Foreign Language Film at the 59th Academy Awards, but was not accepted as a nominee.

== Cast ==
- Edda Heiðrún Backman
- Þröstur Leó Gunnarsson
- Jóhann Sigurðarson

== Synopsis ==
After many years away, Helgi returns to the Eastfjords with his girlfriend Lára. He intends to write a book and hunt deer. The relationship deteriorates due to the isolation and Helgi's obsession with the deer and a nearby fishing boat. After apparently descending into madness, Helgi is wounded and Lára runs across country to seek help. Helgi is found by the search party looking for the boat he reported missing.

== See also ==
- List of submissions to the 59th Academy Awards for Best Foreign Language Film
- List of Icelandic submissions for the Academy Award for Best Foreign Language Film
