= Two Birds (film) =

Two Birds (Smáfuglar)
- Theatrical release poster
- Directed by: Rúnar Rúnarsson
- Written by: Rúnar Rúnarsson
- Produced by: Þórir S. Sigurjónsson; Skúli Fr. Malmquist; Hlín Jóhannesdóttir
- Starring: Hera Hilmar; Atli Óskar Fjalarsson
- Cinematography: Sophia Olsson
- Edited by: Jacob Schulsinger
- Music by: Kjartan Sveinsson
- Production company: Zik Zak Filmworks
- Release date: October 3, 2008
- Running time: 15 minutes
- Country: Iceland
- Language: Icelandic

Two Birds (Icelandic: Smáfuglar, lit. little birds) is a 2008 Icelandic short film, written and directed by Rúnar Rúnarsson. The film premiered at the 2008 Cannes Film Festival, where it was nominated for a Palme d'Or. In the two years after its release it received over 67 international awards at film festivals where it was exhibited, including two Best Actor awards for male lead Atli Óskar Fjalarsson.

== Synopsis ==
The film takes place during one bright summer night and follows a group of young teenagers on a journey from innocence to adulthood. The main character is a timid boy who has a typical schoolboy crush on a girl his age who happens to be a friend of his mate.

== Cast ==
- Hera Hilmar
- Atli Óskar Fjalarsson
- Sigurður Jakob Helgason
- Þórunn Jakobsdóttir
- Gísli Örn Garðarsson
- Víkingur Kristjánsson
- Ómar Örn Hauksson

== Critical reception ==
The website Short of the Week describes Two Birds as "...perhaps the purest and most earnest 15 minutes of film I have ever experienced".

== Other honors ==
- Nominated for Best Short Film at the 2008 European Film Awards
- Nominated for the Palme d'Or at the 2008 Cannes Film Festival
