= Guðbergur Bergsson =

Icelandic writer (1932–2023)

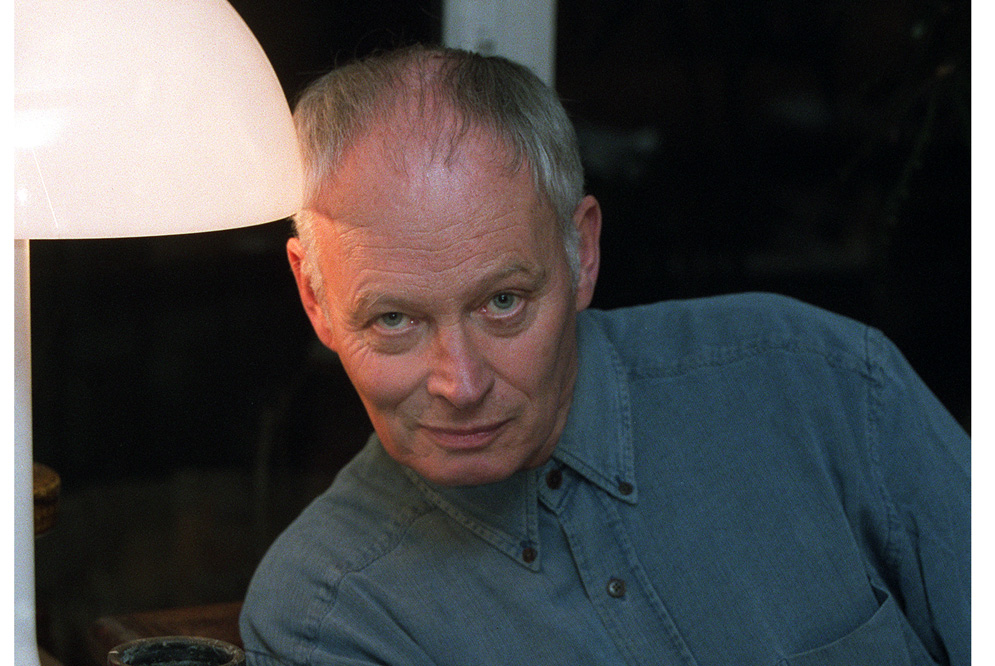
- Born: 16 October 1932; Grindavík, Iceland
- Died: 4 September 2023 (aged 90); Mosfellsbær, Iceland
- Citizenship: Iceland
- Education: University of Iceland; University of Barcelona
- Occupations: Teacher; Author; Translator of Spanish works
- Writing career
- Language: Icelandic
- Period: 1961–?
- Notable work: Svanurinn (The Swan)
- Notable awards: Icelandic Literary Prize; 1997 Faðir og móðir og dulmagn bernskunnar: skáldævisaga Icelandic Literary Prize; 1991 Svanurìnn (The Swan)

Guðbergur Bergsson (16 October 1932 – 4 September 2023) was an Icelandic writer born in Grindavík. He attended the University of Iceland for his Teaching degree and then studied literature at the University of Barcelona. He was one of the leading translators of Spanish works in Iceland. In Barcelona, he met and engaged with the publisher and writer Jaime Salinas Bonmatí.

His first book came out in 1961. He has had twenty books in all including poetry and children's literature. He has won the Icelandic Literary Prize twice. In 2004, he won the Swedish Academy Nordic Prize, known as the 'little Nobel'.

Bergsson died on 4 September 2023, at the age of 90.

== Works ==
- Músin sem læðist, 1961
- Tómas Jónsson, metsölubók (1966). Translated by Lytton Smith as Tómas Jónsson, Bestseller (Open Letter, 2017).
- Ástir samlyndra hjóna, 1967
- Anna, 1968
- Það sefur í djúpinu, 1973
- Hermann og Dídí, 1974
- Það rís úr djúpinu, 1976
- Saga af manni sem fékk flugu í höfuðið, 1979
- Sagan af Ara Fróðasyni og Hugborgu konu hans, 1980
- Hjartað býr enn í helli sínum, 1982
- Leitin að landinu fagra, 1985
- Froskmaðurinn, 1985
- Svanurinn (1991). Translated by Bernard Scudder as The Swan (Mare's Nest, 1997).
- Sú kvalda ást sem hugarfylgsnin geyma, 1993
- Ævinlega, 1994
- Lömuðu kennslukonurnar, 2004
- Leitin að barninu í gjánni - Barnasaga ekki ætluð börnum, 2008
- Missir, 2010
- Hin eilífa þrá, 2012
- Þrír sneru aftur, 2014

== Adaptation ==
In 2017, the Icelandic film director Ása Helga Hjörleifsdóttir shot her first movie The Swan (2017 film), the adaptation of the Svanurinn.
