= Sparrows (2015 film) =

2015 Icelandic film by Rúnar Rúnarsson

- Film poster
- Directed by: Rúnar Rúnarsson
- Written by: Rúnar Rúnarsson
- Produced by: Mikkel Jersin; Rúnar Rúnarsson
- Cinematography: Sophia Olsson
- Edited by: Jacob Schulsinger
- Music by: Kjartan Sveinsson
- Production companies: Nimbus Film; Nimbus Iceland
- Release date: 11 September 2015 (TIFF)
- Countries: Iceland; Denmark; Croatia
- Language: Icelandic
- Box office: $107,663

Sparrows (Icelandic: Þrestir) is a 2015 internationally co-produced film directed by the 2006 short film oscar nominee Rúnar Rúnarsson, starring Atli Óskar Fjalarsson, Rakel Björk Björnsdóttir and Ingvar Eggert Sigurðsson. It tells the story of a 16-year-old boy who moves from his mother in Reykjavík to his father in the Icelandic countryside. It was screened in the Contemporary World Cinema section of the 2015 Toronto International Film Festival. It was selected as the Icelandic entry for the Best Foreign Language Film at the 89th Academy Awards but it was not nominated. Sparrows had a long festival run and was honored with 20 international film awards including the Golden Shell at the 63rd San Sebastián International Film Festival.

== Cast ==
- Atli Óskar Fjalarsson as Ari
- Ingvar Eggert Sigurðsson as Gunnar
- Kristbjörg Kjeld as Grandmother
- Rakel Björk Björnsdóttir as Lára
- Rade Šerbedžija as Tomislav
- Valgeir Hrafn Skagfjörð as Bassi

== Production ==
The film was produced by Denmark's Nimbus Film and its subsidiary Nimbus Iceland, together with Pegasus Pictures and MP Film. It received three million Danish kroner in support from the Danish Film Institute as well as backing from the Icelandic Film Centre, The Croatian Audiovisual Centre and Nordisk Film & TV Fond. Filming began on 14 July 2014 in Iceland.

== See also ==
- List of submissions to the 89th Academy Awards for Best Foreign Language Film
- List of Icelandic submissions for the Academy Award for Best Foreign Language Film
