= Brats (1991 film) =

1991 film

- Directed by: János Rózsa
- Written by: István Kardos
- Starring: Csaba Újvári; Bernadett Visy; Zsolt Gazdag
- Cinematography: Tibor Máthé
- Edited by: Éva Szentandrási
- Music by: Gábor Presser
- Distributed by: MAFILM Objektív Filmstúdió
- Release date: 21 June 1991
- Running time: 86 minutes
- Country: Hungary
- Language: Hungarian

Brats (Hungarian: Félálom) is a 1991 Hungarian drama film directed by János Rózsa. The film was submitted as the Hungarian entry for the Best Foreign Language Film at the 64th Academy Awards, but was not accepted as a nominee.

== Cast ==
- Csaba Újvári as Zoli
- Bernadett Visy as Rita
- Zsolt Gazdag as Laci
- Szabolcs Hajdu as Attila
- Dani Szabó as Csoma

== See also ==
- List of submissions to the 64th Academy Awards for Best Foreign Language Film
- List of Hungarian submissions for the Academy Award for Best Foreign Language Film
