= A Letter from Helga =

2022 Icelandic film

- Film poster
- Icelandic: Svar við bréfi Helgu
- Directed by: Ása Helga Hjörleifsdóttir
- Screenplay by: Ása Helga Hjörleifsdóttir; Ottó Geir Borg; Bergsveinn Birgisson
- Produced by: Birgitta Björnsdóttir; Skúli Fr. Malmquist
- Starring: Hera Hilmar; Þorvaldur Davíð Kristjánsson; Anita Briem; Björn Thors
- Cinematography: Jasper Wolf
- Edited by: Antti Reikko
- Production companies: Vintage Pictures; Zik Zak Filmworks
- Release date: 5 September 2022 (Iceland)
- Running time: 100 minutes
- Countries: Iceland; Netherlands; Estonia
- Language: Icelandic

A Letter from Helga (Icelandic: Svar við bréfi Helgu) is a 2022 Icelandic film written and directed by Ása Helga Hjörleifsdóttir.

A Letter from Helga is a drama set in a remote fjord in 1940's Iceland, where a young farmer Bjarni begins an affair with his neighbour Helga. It is based on a short novel of the same name by Bergsveinn Birgisson.

At the 2023 Edda Awards, Anita Briem and Björn Thors won Supporting Actress and Actor of the Year, respectively, for their roles in the film.

== Plot ==
Helga's farmer husband is often away. People start gossiping about Helga and her neighbour farmer Bjarni. Only rumours, but an affair develops for real, and she becomes pregnant and gives birth to a daughter. Helga wants to start a new life with Bjarni, but he is reluctant. Helga moves to the city with all her children. Bjarni goes to visit her, but she tells Bjarni it is too late now. Bjarni's wife Unnur leaves him, then returns. Many years later, Helga's oldest daughter returns to visit her former home and gives Bjarni the letter from Helga.
