= Marikens bryllup =

1972 film

- Directed by: Knut Andersen
- Written by: Nicole Macé
- Starring: Anne Marit Jacobsen; Geir Børresen; Rolf Just Nilsen; Kari Diesen; Eilif Armand; Gerd Jørgensen; Tone Schwarzott; Per Tofte
- Music by: Egil Monn-Iversen
- Distributed by: Teamfilm A/S
- Release date: 1972
- Running time: 82 minutes
- Country: Norway
- Language: Norwegian

Marikens bryllup (Mariken's Wedding) is a Norwegian comedy from 1972 directed by Knut Andersen with a script by Nicole Macé. Anne Marit Jacobsen plays the title role as Mariken, who marries Per Egil, played by Geir Børresen. The film is about the wedding and presents many family members and friends that come to the wedding.

== Cast ==
- Anne Marit Jacobsen: Mariken
- Geir Børresen: Per Egil Monsen
- Eilif Armand: Birger Lyngmo, the father
- Gerd Jørgensen: Elise Lyngmo, the mother
- Tone Schwarzott: Synnøve
- Inge Fjeldstad: Arne
- Kari Diesen: Aunt Gerda
- Rolf Just Nilsen: Uncle Edvard
- Veslemøy Haslund: Margaret
- Siri Hølmebakk: Heidi
- Jack Fjeldstad: Leif, Per's father
- Per Tofte: Gunnar Sand
- Bjarne Andersen: the priest
- Arne Lie: Carsten
- Kari Simonsen: hairdresser
- Jo Fenstad: Roger
- Anne Karin Paaske: Tone
- Ole Fredrik Røøk: Svein Rune
- Vibeke Lundquist: Mona
- Espen Urbye: Morten
- Edel Eriksen
- Per Hagerup
- Tore Schistad
- Kåre Wicklund
- Kaare Zachariassen
