= The Cured =

2017 film

- Film poster
- Directed by: David Freyne
- Written by: David Freyne
- Screenplay by: David Freyne
- Produced by: Rory Dungan; Rachel O'Kane; Elliot Page
- Starring: Elliot Page; Sam Keeley; Tom Vaughan-Lawlor
- Cinematography: Piers McGrail
- Edited by: Chris Gill
- Music by: Rory Friers; Niall Kennedy
- Production companies: Tilted Pictures; Bac Films; Savage Productions
- Distributed by: IFC Films (United States); Arrow Film Distributors (United Kingdom); Wildcard Distribution (Ireland)
- Release date: 9 September 2017 (TIFF)
- Running time: 95 minutes
- Countries: France; United Kingdom; Ireland; United States
- Language: English
- Box office: $323,776

The Cured is a 2017 Irish horror drama film written and directed by David Freyne in his feature debut film. It stars Elliot Page, Sam Keeley, and Tom Vaughan-Lawlor, and was screened in the Special Presentations section at the 2017 Toronto International Film Festival.

== Plot ==
A plague called the Maze Virus has previously swept through Europe, transforming its victims into a homicidal, zombie-like state. Ireland was particularly badly affected. A cure was later discovered, and 75% of those infected who could be captured have been treated and cured of the virus. The remaining 25% have proven resistant to the cure. The two groups are known as the Cured and the Resistant. The Resistant are held in captivity, despite public fears that keeping them alive could lead to another outbreak.

Senan and Conor are Cured patients who have been interned together. Their 'Rehabilitation Officer', Sergeant Cantor, has little faith that the Cured can integrate back into society without further violence, and treats them with hostility. Senan reunites with his sister-in-law, Abbie, who has a young son, Cillian. Abbie asks Senan what became of her husband, Luke, Senan's brother, who is still missing. Senan claims ignorance of his fate, though it is revealed in one of Senan's many flashbacks that Conor infected Senan, who then killed Luke, in the house that Abbie still lives in. The Cured have a detailed memory of what they have done while infected; many of them suffer from posttraumatic stress disorder. Conor, formerly a lawyer with political aspirations, cannot find work and is shunned by his family for his acts while infected. He forms an underground movement called the Cured Alliance, with the aim of regaining the civil liberties that the Cured have lost.

The government is planning to euthanise the 25% (5,000 patients) who are resistant to the vaccine, despite the assertions of a prominent virologist that a better vaccine for the Resistant is nearly developed. Senan takes a job at the hospital where the Resistant are housed, and observes that they show no interest in attacking the Cured. This is a source of political tension in the community, as the never-infected suspect aloud that the Cured would love to see another outbreak of the Maze Virus, as they would be largely immune to its effects.

Conor attempts to recruit Senan into the Cured Alliance. Senan initially refuses, but after experiencing the hostility of society towards the Cured, he takes part in an arson mission for the group. Conor claims that the targets are uninhabited houses, but a soldier is killed and Cantor suspects Senan and Conor. Cantor approaches Abbie at her house and tells her that the infected are linked in some telepathic manner, and that they form into packs like predatory animals. He suggests that the predatory traits are not eliminated by the vaccine, and that the Cured are still dangerous. He shows Abbie a photograph of Conor and Senan roaming together when they were infected. Conor appeared to be leading Senan in murderous acts in the photo. Conor later approaches Abbie, and tacitly admits that he and Senan killed her husband while they were infected during the early days of the outbreak.

Abbie confronts Senan and throws him out. Senan realises that Conor has no remorse for what he has done in the past, and what he is still doing. Senan assists Cantor in a sting operation to arrest Conor after he confesses aloud to the arson; however, Conor violently murders Cantor and flees. The Cured Alliance initiate a plan to free the Resistant from their confinement. The Resistant take to the streets, killing and infecting new victims and causing mass chaos. Irish Army troops are deployed. Senan finds Abbie, who is frantically trying to retrieve Cillian from his school. Senan rescues Cillian but is confronted by Conor, who beats him savagely. A soldier shoots Conor but he escapes. Senan, Abbie and Cillian return to their house, but Cillian is bitten and infected. Senan, knowing he is immune, takes Cillian, and tells Abbie he will keep him safe until another vaccine is available.

Some time later, a news broadcast announces that order has been restored, although 8,000 new infected people are now in captivity. During the announcement, promotional posters of Conor (as the voice of the Cured Alliance) can be seen. It is publicised that some infected people are now in hiding, as the government is again discussing euthanasia for the resistant 25%. Senan goes into hiding with the infected Cillian.

== Cast ==
- Elliot Page as Abbie (Note: Credited as Ellen Page; Page came out as transgender and changed his name in 2020.)
- Sam Keeley as Senan Browne
- Tom Vaughan-Lawlor as Conor
- Stuart Graham as Cantor
- Paula Malcomson as Dr. Joan Lyons
- Peter Campion as Luke
- Lesley Conroy as Katie
- Natalia Kostrzewa as Allison
- Oscar Nolan as Cillian
- Hilda Fay as Jo Iandecker
- Sarah Kinlen as Catherine
- Barry McGovern as Patrick Ryan
- David Herlihy as Declan
- Ian Toner as IDV Soldier Nick
- Gavin Fullam as IDV Soldier Smiley
- Amy De Bhrún as American Journalist

== Response ==
=== Box office ===
The Cured grossed $26,630 in the United States and Canada and $297,146 in other territories for a worldwide total of $323,776, plus $48,200 with home video sales.

=== Critical reception ===
On review aggregator Rotten Tomatoes, the film holds an approval rating of 70% based on 63 reviews, with an average rating of 6.36/10. The site's critics' consensus reads, "The zombie apocalypse genre is crowded with clichés, but The Cured sets itself slightly apart with some extra BRAAAAAAAAAAINS and thematic depth." On Metacritic, the film has a weighted average score of 57 out of 100, based on 20 critics, indicating "mixed or average reviews".
