= 15th Moscow International Film Festival =

Film festival

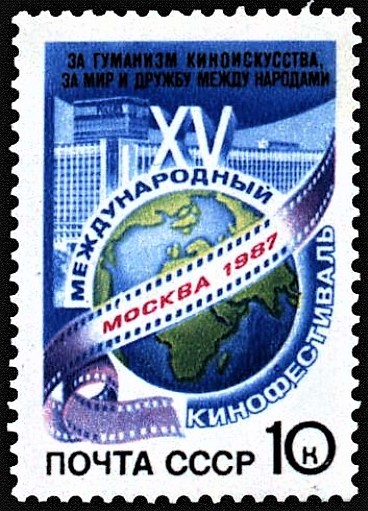
- Soviet postage stamp. Festival emblem.
- Location: Moscow, Soviet Union
- Founded: 1959
- Awards: Grand Prix
- Festival date: 6–17 July 1987
- Website: Website

The 15th Moscow International Film Festival was held from 6 to 17 July 1987. The Golden Prize was awarded to the Italian film Intervista directed by Federico Fellini.

== Jury ==
- Robert De Niro (United States – President of the Jury)
- Tengiz Abuladze (USSR)
- Souheil Ben-Barka (Morocco)
- Antonio Gades (Spain)
- Rustam Ibragimbekov (USSR)
- Alberto Isaac (Mexico)
- Alexandre Mnouchkine (France)
- Gian Luigi Rondi (Italy)
- Zheng Xiuelai (China)
- Hanna Schygulla (West Germany)
- Miklós Jancsó (Hungary)

== Films in competition ==
The following films were selected for the main competition:

English title	Original title	Director(s)	Production country
Hero of the Year	Bohater roku	Feliks Falk	Poland
The House of Bernarda Alba	La casa de Bernarda Alba	Mario Camus	Spain
Jean de Florette	Jean de Florette	Claude Berri	France
The Wife of an Important Man	Zawgat ragol mohim	Mohamed Khan	Egypt
The Serpent's Way	Ormens väg på hälleberget	Bo Widerberg	Sweden
Intervista	Intervista	Federico Fellini	Italy
Kangaroo	Kangaroo	Tim Burstall	Australia
A Touch of Spice	Mirch masala	Ketan Mehta	India
Where Are You Going?	Za kude putuvate?	Rangel Vulchanov	Bulgaria
Courier	Kuryer	Karen Shakhnazarov	Soviet Union
Night of the Pencils	La noche de los lapices	Héctor Olivera	Argentina
Interrogating the Witnesses	Vernehmung der Zeugen	Gunther Scholz	East Germany
Oktoberfest	Oktoberfest	Dragan Kresoja	Yugoslavia
Schmutz	Schmutz	Paulus Manker	Austria
The Immigrant Birds	The Immigrant Birds	Abdul Latif	Afghanistan
A Successful Man	Un hombre de exito	Humberto Solás	Cuba
Early Spring	Barndommens gade	Astrid Henning-Jensen	Denmark
Gardens of Stone	Gardens of Stone	Francis Ford Coppola	United States
Zhenzhen's Beauty Parlor	Zhenzhen de fa wu	Tongjun Xu	China
Life Is Most Important	Lo que importa es vivir	Luis Alcoriza	Mexico
The van Paemel Family	Het gezin van Paemel	Paul Cammermans	Belgium
Forbidden Dreams	Smrt krásných srnců	Karel Kachyňa	Czechoslovakia
Tarot	Tarot	Rudolf Thome	West Germany
Hard Asphalt	Hard asfalt	Sølve Skagen	Norway
Love, Mother	Csók, Anyu!	János Rózsa	Hungary
84 Charing Cross Road	84 Charing Cross Road	David Jones	United Kingdom
The Man in the Black Cape	O Homem da Capa Preta	Sérgio Rezende	Brazil

== Awards ==
- Golden Prize: Intervista by Federico Fellini
- Special Prizes:
  - Courier by Karen Shakhnazarov
  - Hero of the Year by Feliks Falk
- Prizes:
  - Best Actor: Anthony Hopkins for 84 Charing Cross Road
  - Best Actress: Dorottya Udvaros for Love, Mother
- Prix FIPRESCI: Hero of the Year by Feliks Falk
