= An Ordinary Man =

2017 film by Brad Silberling

- Theatrical release poster
- Directed by: Brad Silberling
- Written by: Brad Silberling
- Produced by: Brad Silberling; Ben Kingsley; Rick Dugdale
- Starring: Ben Kingsley; Hera Hilmar; Peter Serafinowicz
- Cinematography: Magdalena Górka
- Edited by: Leo Trombetta
- Music by: Christophe Beck; Chilly Gonzales
- Production companies: Enderby Entertainment; Reveal Entertainment; Lavender Pictures
- Distributed by: Saban Films
- Release dates: April 27, 2017 (Bif&st); April 13, 2018 (United States)
- Running time: 90 minutes
- Country: United States
- Language: English

An Ordinary Man is a 2017 American drama thriller film written, directed and produced by Brad Silberling. It stars Ben Kingsley, Hera Hilmar and Peter Serafinowicz. Filmed in Belgrade, Serbia in 2015, it was screened at the Bari International Film Festival in April 2017 and picked up in February 2018 by Saban Films, who released it direct-to-video in June 2018.

== Plot ==
A war criminal is hiding in plain sight in an unnamed Balkan country. He is wanted internationally for ethnic cleansing and war crimes, but his country pretends his whereabouts to be unknown despite international pressures to turn him in. A retinue of loyalists watches over him and ensures his safety as he goes about his life in a city where his face is well known. He begins to form a relationship with his newly hired maid, Tanja, after he expresses loneliness to her. Initially treating her abusively, he gradually forms an awkward friendship with her. She is later revealed to be an agent who is hired to protect him. She reluctantly drives him to the cemetery in his home village. His driver, who had been waiting for them, kills her on the spot, and drives the General back to his apartment in the city. The last scene shows him awaiting his arrest, seated at his kitchen table, with a handgun and bullets laid out in front of him.

The character of the General is based on Ratko Mladić, who was ultimately sentenced to life in prison for war crimes committed in the Bosnian war.

== Cast ==
- Ben Kingsley as The General
- Hera Hilmar as Tanja
- Peter Serafinowicz as Miro
- Robert Blythe as Grocer

== Reception ==
On review aggregator website Rotten Tomatoes, the film holds an approval rating of 41%, based on 22 reviews, and an average rating of 4.9/10.
