= Waterborne (film) =

- DVD Release Cover
- Directed by: Ben Rekhi
- Written by: Ben Rekhi
- Cinematography: Ben Kutchins
- Release date: March 2005 (South by Southwest Film Festival)
- Running time: 80 minutes
- Country: United States
- Language: English

Waterborne is a 2005 independent film directed by Ben Rekhi and starring Christopher Masterson, Ajay Naidu, Jake Muxworthy, Jon Gries, Christopher Berry, Shabana Azmi and Mageina Tovah. The plot concerns the fates of three different groups of people after a terrorist attack pollutes the water supply of Los Angeles, resulting in a severe water shortage. The score was written and performed by Dredg.

It was the first feature film available for purchase on at the Google video store and won the Special Audience Award at the SXSW Film Festival in 2005.

== Cast ==
- Christopher Masterson ... Zach
- Jake Muxworthy ... Bodi
- Jon Gries ... Ritter
- Christopher Berry ... Carlton (as Chris Berry)
- Ajay Naidu ... Vikram Bhatti
- Mageina Tovah ... Lillian
- Shabana Azmi ... Heera Bhatti
- Lindsay Price ... Jasmine
- Clara Smyth ... Clara
- Noah Segan ... Donovan
- Jenna Dewan ... Devi
- Sarabjit Singh Kaloti ... Gulu
- Al Sapienza ... Connors
- Don Swayze ... Otis
- Bubba Da Skitso ... Pat
- David Parry ... Daniel Polowski
- Leanne Suter ... Jenna Constans
- Anthony Reynolds ... Lt. Strauss
- Chase Mallen ... Maren
- Charlie Talbert ... George
- Fidel Gomez ... Natty Dread
- Teren Greathouse ... Gabe
- Lee Cherry ... Xavier
- Zach Selwyn ... John Davidson
- Dino Campanella ... Looter #1
- Nikki Sinai ... Looter #2
- Helen Kumari ... News Reporter
- Amy Powell ... News Reporter

== Reception ==
Waterborne has an overall approval rating of 100% on Rotten Tomatoes.
