= János Rózsa =

Hungarian film director (b. 1937)

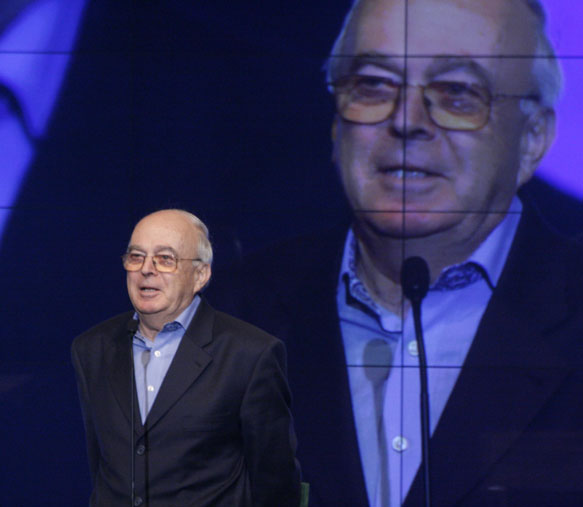
- Born: 19 October 1937 (age 88); Budapest, Hungary
- Occupations: Film director, film producer
- Years active: 1961–2004

János Rózsa (born 19 October 1937) is a Hungarian film director and producer. He has directed 21 films since 1961. His 1987 film Love, Mother was entered into the 15th Moscow International Film Festival.

== Selected filmography ==
- Love, Mother (1987)
- Brats (1991)
- Summer Love (2001)
- Relatives (2006)
