= Sam Keeley =

Irish actor (born 1990)

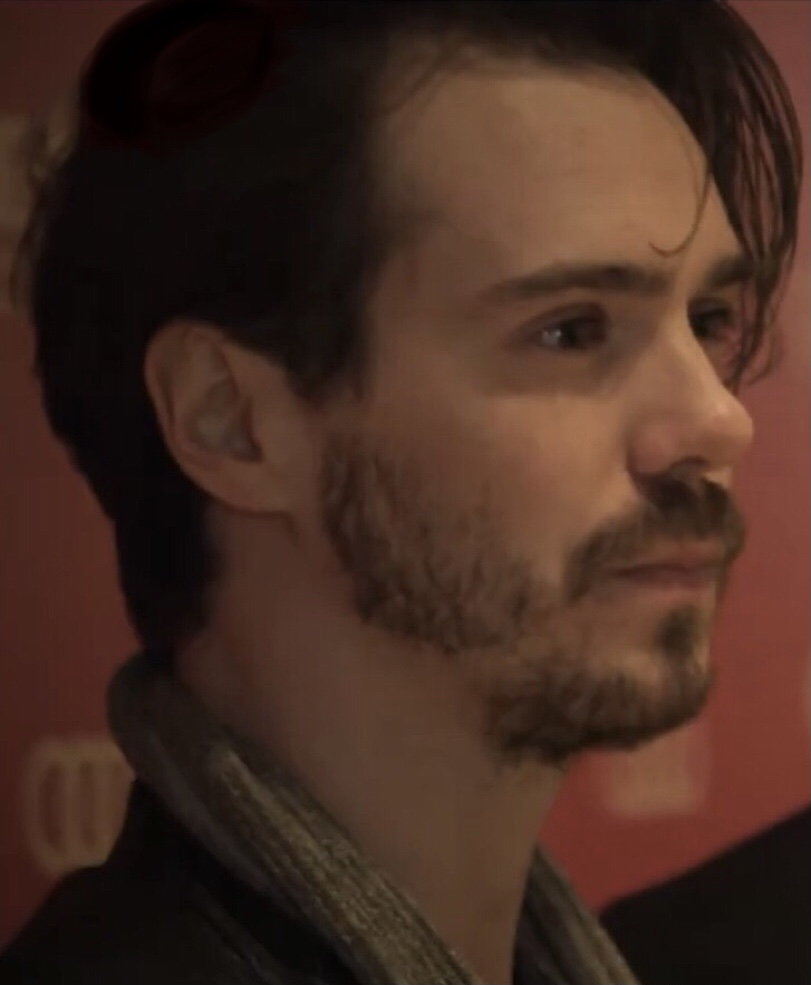
- Keeley at the 2018 Dublin International Film Festival
- Born: Samuel Keeley; 29 November 1990 (age 35); Tullamore, County Offaly, Ireland
- Occupation: Actor
- Years active: 2010–present

Samuel Keeley (born 29 November 1990) is an Irish actor from County Offaly. His first major acting break was in the role of Philip in the RTÉ's television series Raw. He later appeared in the films Burnt, Monsters: Dark Continent, The Siege of Jadotville, In the Heart of the Sea and The Cured. He was also part of the main cast of 68 Whiskey.

== Early and personal life ==
Keeley was born in 1990 and raised in Tullamore in County Offaly in Ireland. In his earlier years he had an interest in establishing a music career. Whilst attending Coláiste Choilm Secondary School, his interest in acting developed and he expanded his acting skills following his failure to complete his Leaving Certificate exams.

In his early 20s, he shared his time living between Tullamore and Dublin. During the making of The Cured, he became a vegetarian. In 2016 he left Dublin to reside partly in Iceland.

== Filmography ==
=== Film ===
Year	Title	Role	Notes
2011	The Other Side of Sleep	Cillian	
2011	This Must Be the Place	Desmond	
2011	Dream House	Complementary role	Uncredited
2012	What Richard Did	Connor Harris	
2014	Monsters: Dark Continent	Michael Parker	
2015	AfterDeath	Sebastian "Seb"	
2015	Burnt	David	
2015	In the Heart of the Sea	Charles Ramsdell	
2016	Alleycats	Jacob "Jake"	
2016	Anthropoid	Josef Bublík	
2016	The Siege of Jadotville	William "Bill Sniper" Ready	
2017	Megan Leavey	Sills	
2017	The Cured	Senan Brown	
2018	The Ashram	James "Jamie"	
2018	Measure of a Man	James "Jim" Smith	
2020	Adventures of a Mathematician	John Williams Calkin	
2020	Recon	Benjamin "Benny" Joyner	
2024	William Tell	Baumgarten	

=== Television ===
Year	Title	Role	Notes
2010	Misfits	Jamie	Episode #2.2
2010	Jack Taylor	Frankie Buckley	Episode: "The Pikemen"
2012	The Borgias	Youth #1	Episode: "Paolo"
2012	Little Crackers	James	Episode: "Sharon Horgan's Little Cracker: The Week Before Christmas"
2012–2013	Raw	Philip	12 episodes
2019	Dublin Murders	Daniel March	6 episodes
2020	68 Whiskey	Cooper Roback	Main role
2020	The English Game	Smalley	Miniseries; 6 episodes
2021–present	Kin	Eric 'Viking' Kinsella	Main role; Winner of 2022 IFTA Award for Best Lead Actor in a TV drama
2022	Joe vs. Carole	John Finlay	Limited series
2024	The Dry	Alex	Series 2
2025	Task	Jayson Wilkes	Miniseries; 6 episodes
