= Frank Krog =

Norwegian actor

- Born: Bergen
- Died: 23 December 2008

Hallgeir Frank Krog (5 October 1954 – 23 December 2008) was a Norwegian actor.

Krog was born in Bergen. He started his career as a stage worker and extra at the theatre Den Nationale Scene, but later attended the Norwegian National Academy of Theatre. He appeared in several Norwegian films, mostly during the 1990s. He also became known for his role in the television series Offshore.

Krog was found dead in his Grünerløkka home on 23 December 2008.

== Filmography ==
- Kautokeino-opprøret (2008)
- Morgan Kane: Døden er en ensom jeger (2001)
- Red Indian (1998)
- Tashunga (1996)
- Offshore (TV, 1996)
- I de beste familier (1994)
- Solens sønn og månens datter (1993)
- Dødelig kjemi (1992)
- Haakon Haakonsen (1990)
- Wayfarers (Landstrykere, 1989)
- Brun bitter (1988)
- Blücher (1988)
- Hard asfalt (1986)
