= Ása Helga Hjörleifsdóttir =

Icelandic film director and screenwriter

- Born: 1 August 1984 (age 41)
- Occupations: film director; screenwriter

Ása Helga Hjörleifsdóttir (born 1 August 1984) is an Icelandic film director and screenwriter. Ása graduated with an MA in filmmaking from Columbia University in 2012. Ása's 2017 feature film, The Swan, was based on Guðbergur Bergsson's 1991 book of the same name. Her second film, A Letter from Helga, was based on Bergsvein Birgisson's 2010 book of the same name.

== Filmography ==
Director

- Love Story (2012) – short
- You and Me (2015) – short
- The Swan (2017)
- Last Dance (2020) – short
- A Letter from Helga (2022)
