= Pál Királyhegyi =

Hungarian comedian, journalist, and writer

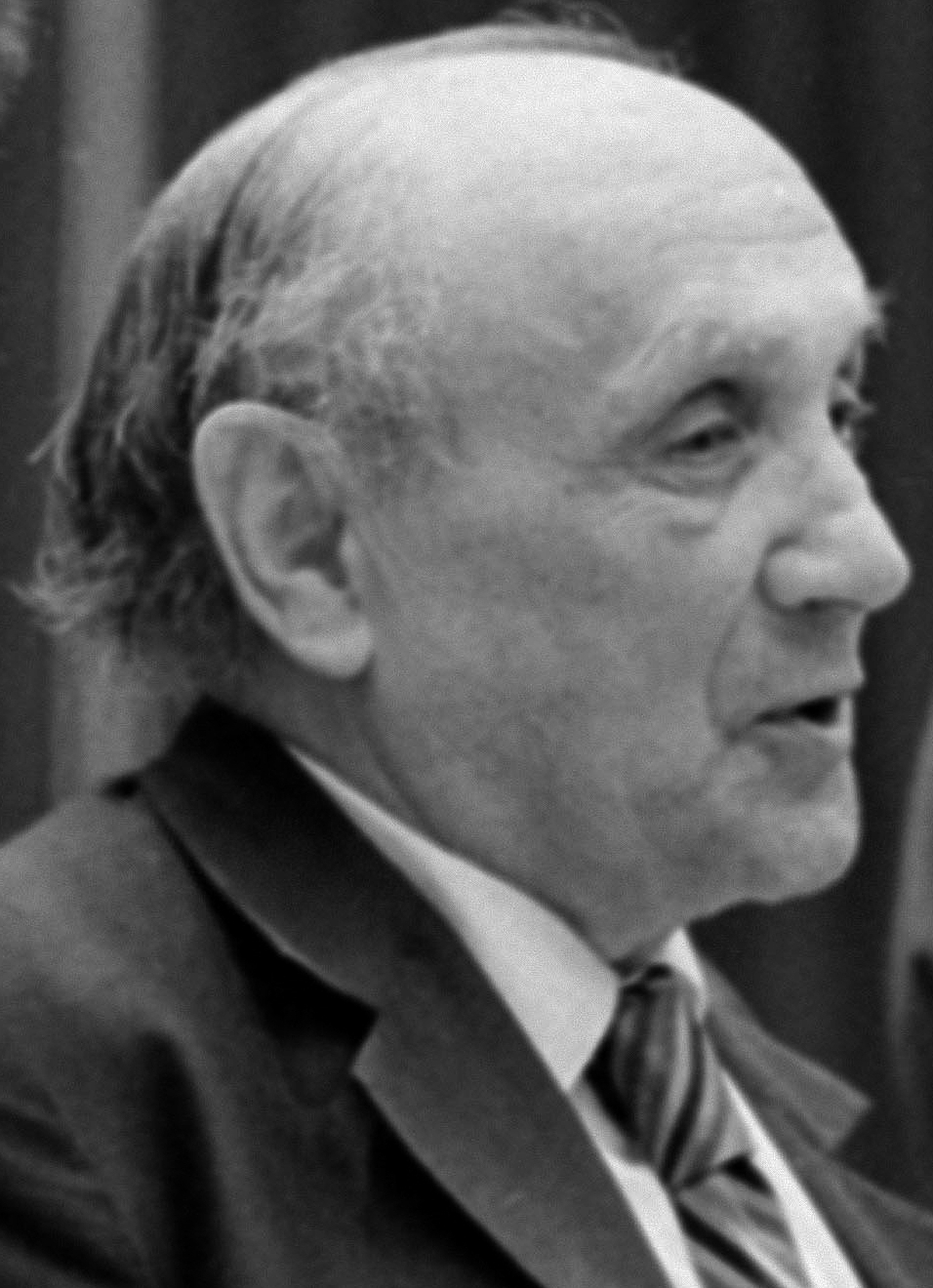
- Born: 27 December 1900; Budapest, Hungary
- Died: 7 August 1981 (aged 80); Budapest, Hungary
- Occupations: Author; screenwriter; journalist; translator

Pál Királyhegyi (27 December 1900 – 7 August 1981) was a Hungarian comedian, journalist, author and screenwriter.

== Life ==
He was born in a Jewish family in Budapest, Hungary, to Berta Himler and Jenő Királyhegyi. He emigrated to the US at the age of 19 where at first he worked as a journalist at Hungarian newspapers, from 1927 to 1931 he was a figurant, later a screenwriter in Hollywood. In 1931 he returned to Hungary, and continued working at Hungarian newspapers, such as Pesti Napló, Új Idők or Színházi Élet, until 1938, when he emigrated to England, from where he came back to Budapest in 1941. Three years later he was deported to the Auschwitz concentration camp, luckily he survived the war and returned to Hungary. In 1950 or 1951 he was relocated to Adács. Although some years later the Communist Regime allowed him to move back to Budapest, they did not let him publish. After the revolution in 1956, they published his writings again, and he also worked as a compere. He died on 7 August 1981.

== Quotes ==
"I hurried home, not to miss the Auschwitz Express. I didn't."

"-Where are you taking us?
- To the extermination camp.
- Finally some good news. When will we get there?
- It's hard to tell. It's wartime."

"After all, it's all right that the world is organized as it is. It struck me that despite inflation, all this talk about good money and bad money is pointless. The truth is, in the end, that the truly great and important things don't cost anything. One doesn't have to pay for the air, the kiss, if it costs money, is not worth anything, health is for free, and if you haven't got it, no matter what shop you go for it, you can't buy it even for a lot of money. The sun also shines for free, and has for so long, and the sweet scent of roses is brought to me free by the complimentary summer breeze."

" One shouldn't take too seriously women, the kisses, the trains, the cities, the people, this whole great everything, life. Pay attention, because it is a colorful, interesting and spectacular play. What matters never changes. All of it is an adventure, there is no beginning and no end. There are only stations. We are running, panting, chasing happiness, but we can't catch up with it."

== Anecdotes ==
According to urban legend, after the war, he wrote a telegram to Stalin, that was not sent, but widely circulated among his friends: "To Generalissimus Stalin, Moscow. The system is not working STOP Please cease immediately STOP Kiralyhegyi STOP"

== Works ==
- Hogyan szerezzünk ellenségeket? (Szépirodalmi Könyvkiadó, Budapest, 1970)
- Csak te és ők (Szépirodalmi Könyvkiadó, Budapest, 1974) ISBN 963-150-147-7
- Királyhegyi Pál (1979). Első kétszáz évem. Budapest: Gondolat Könyvkiadó. ISBN 963-280-777-4. (autobiography)
- Négyszemközt önmagammal (Szépirodalmi Könyvkiadó, Budapest, 1980) ISBN 963-151-716-0
- A gengszterek nem nőnek az égig (K.u.K. Kiadó, Budapest, 2002) ISBN 963-938-438-0
- Ami sürgős, az ráér (Jövendő Könyvkiadó, 2006) ISBN 963-865-083-4
