= Tone Schwarzott =

Norwegian actress and poet (born 1941)

- Born: 9 January 1941 (age 85); Porsgrunn, Norway
- Occupations: poet and actress

Tone Schwarzott (born 9 January 1941) is a Norwegian actress and poet.

== Biography ==
Schwarzott was born in Porsgrunn on 9 January 1941. She is a daughter of pianist Wilhelm Cathrinus Schwarzott and Eva Johanne Haslund.

She made her stage debut at Nationaltheatret in 1963, and was assigned with this theatre until 2002. She has also performed for Fjernsynsteatret and Radioteatret. Among films she participated in are 3 from 1971, Marikens bryllup from 1972, and Hard Asphalt from 1986. She made her literary debut in 1965 with the poetry collection Veien til mitt hus, and published eight more collections during the 1970s.
