= Oddur Björnsson =

Icelandic playwright

- Oddur
- Born: 25 October 1932; Ásar, Skaftártunga, Kingdom of Iceland
- Died: 21 November 2011 (aged 79); Reykjavík, Iceland
- Education: University of Vienna
- Occupation: Playwright
- Spouse: Bergljót Gunnarsdóttir
- Children: 2, including Hilmar Oddsson

Oddur Björnsson (25 October 1932 – 21 November 2011) was an Icelandic playwright and one of the main modernists in Icelandic playwriting. He is best known for his works Hornakóralinn, which premiered in 1967, and The 13th Crusade, which premiered in 1993. Oddur received the DV cultural award in 1981 for directing Bedið by Godot and Grímunn's honorary award in June 2011 for his invaluable contribution to Icelandic performing arts.

== Notable works ==
- Kirkjuferðin (1966)
- Hornkóralinn (1967)
- Brúðkaup furstans af Fernara (1970)
- Postulín (1971)
- Skemmtiganga (1973)
- Draugasaga (1985)
- The 13th Crusade (1993)
