= Edda Heiðrún Backman =

Icelandic actress, singer and artist

- Born: 27 November 1957; Akranes, Iceland
- Died: 1 October 2016 (aged 58); Reykjavík, Iceland
- Occupations: Actress; voice actress; singer; painter; director
- Years active: 1978–2016
- Children: 2

Edda Heiðrún Backman (27 November 1957 – 1 October 2016) was an Icelandic actress, voice actress, singer, painter and director.

She was involved in many theatre productions in Iceland, as well as Icelandic films. In 2004 she quit acting and started directing after getting diagnosed with MND. She retired altogether from the theatre in 2006.

== Early life ==
Backman was born to parents Jóhanna Dagfríður Arnmundardóttir and Halldór Sigurður Backman in Akranes, Iceland in 1957. The family moved to Reykjavík when she was three years old. She has 3 siblings: Arnmundur Sævar, supreme court prosecutor, Inga Jónína, singer and Ernst Jóhannes, graphic advertiser.

In 1997 she looked back on her childhood with happy memories: "I used to visit my grandparents in Akranes quite often. I used to call it "fat camp". I was a tiny little thing as a child and my grandmother made sure that I would return to the city well fed. I loved to stay with my grandparents. It was so quiet and I could run around rhubarb gardens and steal an occasional rutabaga".

The first time she went to a theatre was when she was about nine years old. It was an Icelandic adoption of the Norwegian children's play In the Forest of Huckybucky (Norwegian: Dyrene i Hakkebakkeskogen) by Thorbjørn Egner.

She graduated from Menntaskólin við Sund in 1978.

== Career in acting/directing ==
Backman graduated from Leiklistarskóli Íslands (the Icelandic Drama School) in 1983.

In a 2015 special broadcast by RÚV she told the viewers that in the beginning, she wanted to be a dramatic actress but was thrown into comedy, where she had her breakout role in the New Year sketch show Áramótaskaupið in 1985. After that she played equally many dramatic parts as comic parts. She also had to train her voice to become deeper since it was very high in high school. She stated in an interview in 2005 that her wide voice range helped her in her career, especially in her role as Audrey in the Icelandic adaptation of the Little Shop of Horrors in 1985.

Backman's debut role was as Árdís in the play Í hart í bak by Jökull Jakobsson. The play was set up in Iðnó in central Reykjavík. After that she starred in an Icelandic adaptation of Guys and Dolls at the National Theatre of Iceland.

In the summertime she worked at the art gallery Gallerí Borg to make money between acting jobs.

In 1985 she starred in two Icelandic films: Svart og sykurlaust and Eins og skepnan deyr. That same year she also starred in the play Milli skinns og hörunds and as Audrey in the Icelandic adaptation of the Little Shop of Horrors. The Little Shop of Horrors got very popular and played over 100 times before closing. This was also Backman's singing debut.

When The Little Shop of Horrors ended Backman starred as a wrestler in a play called Rauðhóla-Ransí.

In 1987 she starred in a TV-movie for RÚV. After that she had a large role in the play Djöflaeyjan. She then starred in the Icelandic adaptation of Les Misérables and in The National Theatre of Iceland's Christmas play.

In 1988 she played Columbine in the play Lygarinn, an Italian play which did not do well with ticket sales. She then starred in a TV-play, and another small play before starring in Chang & Eng, a play based on the lives of Siamese twins Chang and Eng Bunker.

In 1989 she started working in the new Reykjavík City Theatre in Reykjavík. Her first role there was as Vegmeyja in Höll sumarlandsins. She loved this new theatre with its large and demanding stage.

In 1990 Backman was hired on a 1-year contract with the National Theatre of Iceland and starred as a singer in the Icelandic adaptation of Romeo and Juliet. That same year she was given the "Stefanía grant". It is a memorial grant from the estate of actress Stefaníu Guðmundsdóttur given to promising Icelandic actors. Backman used the money to travel to Russia for 5 weeks visiting theatres in Moscow and Leningrad for educational purposes. In the spring of 1991, after a disagreement with the theatre director, Backman tore up her contract with the National Theatre of Iceland and went back to the Reykjavík City Theatre.

She then starred as Elmira in Tartuffe by Molière. In 1992-1993 theatre season she starred in the Spanish fly and Eva Luna.

In the years 1994-1997 she played in numerous other plays and musicals. To name a few are: Lady Macbeth in Macbeth, Elvira in Don Juan and Sally Bowles in Cabaret in 1995. In 1996 she starred in a Finnish-French-Icelandic TV-series for teenagers about people on horses in the Icelandic highlands.

Backman was also a talented voice actress and lent her voice to numerous animated characters. To name some are: Jasmine in Aladdin, Shenzi in Lion King, Esmeralda in The Huncback of Notre Dame, Kanga in The Many Adventures of Winnie the Pooh, Georgette in Oliver & Company and Lady in Lady and the Tramp.

=== Singing career ===
Backman had her singing debut in the Little Shop of Horrors in 1985. She took singing and piano lessons for one semester.

in 1990 she started the singing quartet Blái Hatturin (Eng: the blue hat) with fellow actors/singers Egill Ólafsson, Jóhann Sigurðarsson, Jóhann G. Jóhannsson and Ása Hlín Svavarsdóttir. They traveled and performed all over Iceland and went abroad a few times. The group split in 1993 but remained friends.

She has released an album with Icelandic children's songs, children's Christmas songs and released albums with her musicals: The Little Shop of Horrors, Cabaret and Eva Luna.

== Later career ==
Backman retired from the theatre in 2006. In 2007 she opened the flower shop Súkkulaði og rósir (Eng: Chocolates and roses) where she wanted to sell the finest chocolates and the most beautiful roses.

In 2008 Backman found a new career when she started to paint with her mouth. She painted oil- and water paintings of birds and the people she cared about. In the fall of 2009 she was accepted into The Association of Mouth and Foot Painters. In her career as an artist she threw numerous art shows both in Reykjavík and all over Iceland as well as having her paintings on display overseas.

Backman became a vivid spokesperson for the rights of disabled people. She raised about 200 million Icelandic Kronas for rebuilding and updating facilities for people who were training to get back mobility after sickness or accidents.

She was also a vivid speaker for protecting the environment and especially the Icelandic nature. She founded the organization Rödd náttúrunnar (Eng: Nature's Voice). Her dream was to create a national park in the Icelandic mid-highlands.

== Personal life ==
Backman has two children Arnmundur Ernst, an actor and Unnur Birna, a high school student at the time of her mother's death.

== Death ==
Backman died, after suffering from amyotrophic lateral sclerosis for twelve years, at Landsspítalinn in Reykjavík on 1 October 2016. Her funeral took place in Hallgrímskirkja on 10 October 2016.

== Awards ==
- 2003 - Edda Award
- 2005 - Order of the Falcon
- 2006 - City Artist of Reykjavík
- 2008 - The parliament of Iceland's honorary artist award
- 2015 - Gríman (theatre academy of Iceland) honorary Award
