= Rúnar Rúnarsson =

Icelandic screenwriter and director

- Born: 20 January 1977 (age 49); Reykjavík, Iceland
- Occupations: screenwriter; film director
- Awards: Edda Award for Best Director

Rúnar Rúnarsson (born 20 January 1977 in Reykjavík) is an Icelandic screenwriter and director. He graduated from the National Film School of Denmark in 2009. His credits include the feature film Volcano and the short films Anna, Two Birds, and The Last Farm. The latter was nominated for the Academy Award for Best Live Action Short Film in 2006. He is referred to as the most awarded short film director in the world with more than 90 awards.

His second feature, Sparrows, is a coming-of-age story that was released in 2015. For Sparrows Rúnarsson won the Silver Hugo for best new director at Chicago International Film Festival.

His 2019 film Echo entered the competition of the Locarno Film Festival.

His 2024 film When the Light Breaks opened Un Certain Regard section in Cannes.

In 2025, the film When the Light Breaks won the Dragon Award Best Nordic Film at the Göteborg Film Festival

== Filmography ==
- Klósettmenning (1995, short film)
- Lífsg(æði) (1997, short film)
- Oiko Logos (1997, short film)
- Rætur (2000, documentary)
- Leitin að Rajeev (2002, documentary)
- Bragur (2000, short film)
- The Last Farm (2004, short film)
- Two Birds (2008, short film)
- Anna (2009, short film)
- Volcano (2011)
- Sparrows (2015)
- Echo (2019)
- When the Light Breaks (2024)
- O (2024, short film)
