= Tears of Stone (film) =

1995 film

- Film poster
- Directed by: Hilmar Oddsson
- Written by: Hilmar Oddsson
- Starring: Þröstur Leó Gunnarsson
- Release date: 15 September 1995
- Running time: 110 minutes
- Country: Iceland
- Language: Icelandic

Tears of Stone (Icelandic: Tár úr steini) is a 1995 Icelandic drama film directed by Hilmar Oddsson. The film was selected as the Icelandic entry for the Best Foreign Language Film at the 68th Academy Awards, but was not accepted as a nominee.

== Cast ==
- Þröstur Leó Gunnarsson as Jón
- Ruth Olafsdottir as Annie (as Ruth Ólafsdóttir)
- Ulrich Tukur as Ernst Züchner
- Hera Hilmarsdóttir as Jón's daughter
- Heinz Bennent as Annie's father
- Ingrid Andree as Annie's mother
- Winfried Wagner as Narrator

== See also ==
- List of submissions to the 68th Academy Awards for Best Foreign Language Film
- List of Icelandic submissions for the Academy Award for Best Foreign Language Film
