= Hilmar Oddsson =

Icelandic film director (born 1957)

- Born: 19 January 1957 (age 69); Reykjavík, Iceland
- Education: University of Television and Film Munich
- Occupations: film director; screenwriter; film producer; musician
- Spouse: Guðlaug Matthildur Jakobsdóttir
- Children: 2; including Hera
- Awards: Edda Award for Best Director

Hilmar Oddsson (born 19 January 1957 in Reykjavík) is an Icelandic film director, screenwriter, film producer and musician.

== Early life ==
Hilmar was born in 1957, as the first child of the playwright and theatre director Oddur Björnsson (1932-2011) and his first wife Borghildur Thors (born 1933). He has a younger sister Elísabet Á Oddsdóttir (born 1958).

He attended high-school at Menntaskólinn í Reykjavík, where he was active in the theatre club. Until 1986 he studied at the HFF University of Television and Film Munich.

== Career ==
This was followed by his first directing work, Eins og skepnan deyr for which he also wrote the screenplay. In 1995, Hilmar Oddsson made a biopic about Icelandic composer Jón Leifs called Tears of Stone (Tár úr steini). Hilmar won the Edda Award for Best Director (Leikstjóri ársins) and Edda Award for Best Film (Bíómynd ársins) in 2004 for his work Cold Light (Kaldaljós). His other films include The Beast and No Trace. In addition to his feature films, Hilmar Oddsson was involved in the creation of numerous television reports, video clips, and commercials. From 2004 to 2006, he was chairman of the Icelandic Directors' Guild (Samtök kvikmyndaleikstjóra).

Besides his work as a filmmaker, Hilmar Oddsson is also a musician. He also played both guitar and keyboard in the band Melchior since 1973, releasing three albums. He composed the film music for his film The Beast (Eins og skepnan deyr). In 1989, Hilmar Oddsson released the solo album Og augun opnast. From 1998 to 2006, he was a member of the Board of Directors of the Iceland Symphony Orchestra. Hilmar Oddsson was Dean of the Icelandic Film School (Kvikmyndaskóli Íslands) from 2010 to 2017.

His marriage to actress Þórey Sigþórsdóttir produced two children, including actress Hera Hilmar.

== Filmography ==
- The Beast (Eins og skepnan deyr) (1986)
- Cinderella and the Man Who Had No Trousers (Öskubuska og maðurinn sem átti engar buxur) (1987, TV film)
- Tears of Stone (Tár úr steini) (1995)
- No Trace (Sporlaust) (1998)
- dieter roth puzzle Documentary (2008)
- Cold Light (Kaldaljós) (2004)
- December (Desember) (2009)
- Driving Mum (2022)
