= Piper =

A piper is a musician, a player of the bagpipe. As a noun proper, Piper may also refer to:

== People ==
- Piper (given name)
- Piper (surname)

== Arts and entertainment ==
=== Fictional characters ===
==== Comics ====
- Piper (Morlock), in the Marvel Universe
- Piper (Mutate), in the Marvel Universe

==== Television ====
- Piper Chapman, lead character in the American comedy-drama series Orange Is the New Black
- Piper Gray, one of the lead characters in the Canadian sitcom Some Assembly Required
- Piper Halliwell, one of the lead characters on Charmed
- Piper Hart, Henry Hart's little sister in the Nickelodeon series Henry Danger
- Piper O'Possum, a Nick Jr. mascot
- Piper Willis, in the Australian soap opera Neighbours
- Piper Willowbrook, an elf in the Nickelodeon series Mysticons
- Piper, an artificial intelligence in Emergence
- Piper, a tactical expert in Storm Hawks
- Mr. Piper, host on the 1960s Canadian television show of the same name

==== Other ====
- Piper, a character in the 2012 American independent feature movie California Solo
- Piper McLean, a daughter of Aphrodite and one of the seven in Rick Riordan's The Heroes of Olympus
- Piper Pinwheeler, a character in the 2005 animated film Robots
- Piper Wheel, a character in Zenless Zone Zero
- Piper, in the video game Mario & Luigi: Superstar Saga
- Piper, a character in a sidequest in the video game Paper Mario: Color Splash
- Piper Wright, a reporter in the video game Fallout 4
- Piper Willowbrook, a main character of Mysticons
- Piper de la Prim, a playable character in the mobile game Brawl Stars
- Piper, a character from Bendy and the Ink Machine
- The Piper, a character in The Keys to the Kingdom book series

=== Films ===
- The Piper (1985 film), an Egyptian film
- The Piper (2015 film), a South Korean mystery film
- Piper (film), a 2016 Pixar short film
- The Piper (2023 film), a horror film written and directed by Erlingur Thoroddsen

=== Music ===
- Piper, a 1970s rock band fronted by Billy Squier
- Piper, a Japanese city pop band formed in the early 1980s fronted by Keisuke Yamamoto
- "Piper" from the 1985 P-Model Karkador album
- "Piper", from the 2000 Phish Farmhouse album
- "The Piper" (song), from the 1980 ABBA Super Trouper album
- ”The Piper at the Gates of Dawn”, the first album by Pink Floyd

=== Video games ===
- Piper (video game), a 1995 interactive movie video game

== Biology ==
- Piper (plant), a plant genus
- Piper gurnard (Trigla lyra), a species of fish that makes a distinctive sound when taken out of the water
- Piper, Hyporhamphus ihi, a species of fish with a long lower jaw
- Eurytela, a genus of butterflies known as pipers
- Piper diagram, for water chemistry data

== Places ==
- Piper, Iowa, an unincorporated community in the United States
- Piper, Kansas, a neighborhood in Kansas City, United States
- Piper, Missouri, an unincorporated community in the United States
- Piper Peak (Nevada), a mountain
- Piper Pass, a pass on Ellesmere Island, Nunavut, Canada
- Piper oilfield, in the North Sea

== Transportation ==
- Piper Aircraft, an American manufacturer of general aviation aircraft
- Piper Cars, a former British maker of sports cars
- ST Piper, a tugboat

== Other uses ==
- USS Piper, a US Navy submarine which served in World War II
- Piper High School (disambiguation)
- Piper (source control system), a centralized version control system used by Google
- ETA10-P or "Piper", a model of the ETA10 supercomputer

== See also ==
- Piper-Heidsieck, a champagne producer
- Pipers (disambiguation)
- Pyper, a list of people with the surname or given name
