= Dabster =

Dabster may refer to:

- The Dabster, a 1973 Finnish novel by Heikki Turunen
- The Dabster (film), a 1975 Finnish film
- Sid Dabster and Pearl Dabster, characters from the webcomic User Friendly
