= Pauliina Susi =

Finnish writer

Pauliina Susi (born 14 January 1968 in Helsinki) is a Finnish writer. Her debut novel Ruuhkavuosi was nominated for the Helsingin Sanomat Literature Prize in 2005. In 2016, she received a Lead of the Year award from the Finnish Detective Society for her book Takaikkuna (2015).
