= Athena-Artemis =

2005 novel compilation by Seppo Telenius

Athena-Artemis: Goddesses Artemis and Athene (Athena), "Auringolla ratsastajat" (Riders on the Sun), and "Valtiatar Artemis" (Mistress Artemis)
- Author: Seppo Telenius [Mary Vol has chiefly written the English article "Goddesses Artemis and Athene(Athena)"]
- Original title: Auringolla ratsastajat
- Translator: Joop Wassenaar
- Cover artist: [Helsinki] Kirja kerrallaan
- Language: Chiefly in Finnish, with some texts in English
- Genre: Article (Goddesses Artemis and Athene), Novel (Auringolla ratsastajat), Short story (Valtiatar Artemis)
- Publisher: [Helsinki] Kirja kerrallaan
- Publication date: (31 July 2005) 30 June 2006
- Publication place: Finland
- Media type: Print (paperback)
- Pages: 73
- OCLC: 266074185

The book Athena-Artemis (Helsinki: Kirja kerrallaan 2005 and 2006) is compilation of a novel and other texts.

In Seppo Sakari Telenius' novel manuscript (1992), published as Auringolla ratsastajat (Riders on the Sun) [Goddess Artemis Ltd., 1995 and 1996. Books on Demand GmbH, 2011. ISBN 978-952-498-912-1], the goddess of war has no name. The goddess shows up as a combination of Minerva and Pallas Athena. The other important personage in the novel Nina Minerva, she too carries characteristics of the goddess. On the other hand Nina Minerva has, especially in her youth, been more like Artemis and Diana. At the end of the novel, Nina reminds us also of Artemis from Ephesus. Instead, we cannot think of any god reminding us of the other, male prime personage, named Jan.

Jouni Inkala has written to Seppo Telenius: "Yes, you are a very fast comprehending author, spoiling your readers with your insights. Many times I chuckled while reading. In many places the suppleness of the plot is so smooth that the reader is almost treacherously twisted forth and back. I was sensing something of the fantasy of Leena Krohn especially in some parts around Jan and Theresia. The same rough poetry fills up the contract between Nina and Monique..."

The Finnish novel Auringolla ratsastajat was written in Porvoo. The novel is also included in the anthology Athena-Artemis: Goddesses Artemis and Athene (Athena), "Auringolla ratsastajat" (Riders on the Sun), and "Valtiatar Artemis" (Mistress Artemis) [Helsinki: Kirja kerrallaan, 2005 and 2006]. Athena-Artemis (printed in 2005), ISBN 952-91-9467-6. Athena-Artemis (Revised 2nd Edition in 2006), ISBN 952-92-0560-0. Also the English article Goddesses Artemis and Athene (Athena) and the Finnish short story Valtiatar Artemis are included in Athena-Artemis. A rare edition is Wow: the novel Auringolla ratsastajat and other texts [Goddess Artemis Ltd., 2017].

== See also ==
- Artemis
- Athena
- Porvoo
- Telenius
