= Piper (comics) =

Piper, in comics, may refer to:

- Piper (Morlock), a member of Marvel Comics' Morlocks
- Piper (Mutate), a member of Marvel Comics' Savage Land Mutates
- Pied Piper (DC Comics), a DC Comics character known as Piper

== See also ==
- Piper (disambiguation)
