= Beasts of the Sea (novel) =

2023 novel by Iida Turpeinen

- Author: Iida Turpeinen
- Original title: Elolliset
- Translator: David Hackston
- Language: Finnish
- Genre: Historical fiction
- Publisher: Kustantamo S&S
- Publication date: 2023
- Publication place: Finland
- English publication date: 2025
- Media type: Print (hardback)
- Pages: 297 (Finnish edition)
- ISBN: 978-951-52-5977-6 Finnish edition

Beasts of the Sea is the debut novel by Finnish writer Iida Turpeinen, first published in 2023 by Kustantamo S&S. A historical novel spanning three centuries, it follows the history of Steller's sea cow and a skeleton that eventually entered the collections of the Natural History Museum of Helsinki. Through figures from the history of natural science, the novel explores extinction, biodiversity loss and changes in humanity's relationship with the natural world.

The novel won the Helsingin Sanomat Literature Prize in 2023 and the Thank You for the Book Award in 2024. It was also nominated for the 2023 Finlandia Prize for fiction.

== Background and writing ==
Turpeinen began writing the novel in 2016. The idea arose during a visit to the Natural History Museum of Helsinki, where she encountered a Steller's sea cow skeleton and its accompanying description. Learning that the species had become extinct only 27 years after its scientific description prompted her to investigate its history. She began by borrowing the journals of naturalist Georg Wilhelm Steller from the National Library of Finland.

During the seven-year writing process, Turpeinen drew on historical sources and scholarly literature. Her research for the section on Steller included his own writings, ships' logbooks and accounts by other members of the expedition. She traced the skeleton's subsequent history through letters, historical publications, museum archives and interviews with museum staff. According to Turpeinen, reconstructing the history of an individual museum specimen proved more difficult than researching the extensively studied eighteenth-century expedition.

The Finnish title emerged after the editor noticed that the word elolliset recurred throughout the manuscript. Turpeinen explained that it evokes historical scientific terminology and the idea of humans as living beings among other forms of life.

== Plot and characters ==
The novel's narratives, set in different periods, are connected by Steller's sea cow and its skeleton. Its characters are based on historical people.

In 1741, naturalist Georg Wilhelm Steller joins an expedition led by Vitus Bering in search of a sea route from Asia to America. During the shipwrecked expedition's struggle for survival, Steller encounters the large marine mammal that will later bear his name. The animals provide food for humans, but subsequent hunting leads to the species' extinction.

In the nineteenth-century section, Johan Hampus Furuhjelm, governor of Russian America, searches for a sea cow skeleton for zoology professor Alexander von Nordmann. Life in the colony is presented through the perspective of the governor's wife, Anna. Furuhjelm's sister Constance also finds a role caring for the natural history collections.

Scientific illustrator Hilda Olson works as Nordmann's assistant and accompanies him on research trips. She also draws the sea cow skeleton brought to Helsinki. In 1952, museum preparator John Grönvall is assigned to restore the skeleton. His story also concerns bird egg collecting and bird conservation in the Aspskär archipelago.

== Themes and narrative style ==
According to Turpeinen, the novel developed during the writing process into an account of the emergence of the concept of extinction and how understanding the disappearance of species transformed humanity's perception of its place in nature. Depicting these changes in intellectual history led her to extend the narrative across several centuries. She has described the novel as a work grounded in the humanities: alongside scientific knowledge, it addresses human experience and the emotions associated with biodiversity loss.

Frida Keränen interprets the novel as broadening the perspective of the history of science by placing women whose work has received little attention alongside prominent men. In her reading, Anna Furuhjelm's attitudes towards Alaska's Indigenous population connect the classification of nature with the exercise of colonial power. Mikko Saari highlights the contradiction between an interest in natural history and damage to nature: bird egg collectors, for example, could consider themselves nature lovers while endangering birds through their activities. The novel's afterword lists species declared extinct during its writing.

The narrative combines sections centred on individual characters with italicised chapters that present scientific knowledge and extended timescales beyond the characters' own understanding. It does not use direct dialogue. Keränen draws attention to the alternation between long and short sentences and to passages in which the sea cow itself provides the narrative perspective.

== Reception ==
=== Reviews ===
Antti Majander of Helsingin Sanomat regarded the novel as a significant work of European literature. He praised its selective use of historical material and the concision of its narrative. Nina Holm of Suomen Kuvalehti emphasised the precision of its language and the integration of background research into the story, particularly in its early sections. Mikko Saari of Kulttuuritoimitus awarded the novel five stars out of five, finding that it combined a historical foundation with vivid storytelling.

Frida Keränen of Kiiltomato.net considered it an accomplished debut and identified its language as a particular strength. She also expressed reservations: the uniform style reduced distinctions between characters, while the possibilities of combining scientific and literary writing were, in her view, not fully realised.

=== Awards and nominations ===
The novel won the 2023 Helsingin Sanomat Literature Prize. The jury praised its ability to connect individual lives with global ecological change while retaining a sense of hope despite its subject matter. That year, it was also nominated for the Finlandia Prize for fiction and the Torch-Bearer Prize.

In 2024, the novel received the Thank You for the Book Award. The jury highlighted its historical research, combination of literature and natural science, and capacity to stimulate discussion about humanity's role in biodiversity loss. The French translation was nominated for the Prix du Meilleur Livre Étranger in 2024, and the novel was selected as one of five nominees for the Premio Strega Europeo in 2025.

== Translations and international publication ==
In November 2023, the publisher announced that translation rights had been sold for 19 language territories. By then, the Finnish edition had gone through four printings in two months. According to figures published by FILI in December 2025, rights had been sold for 28 language territories and 18 translations had appeared.

David Hackston's English translation, Beasts of the Sea, was published in the United Kingdom by MacLehose Press in October 2025 and in the United States by Little, Brown in November 2025. The English title refers to Steller's writing on marine animals. The novel was selected as the December 2025 book for the book club of The Late Show with Stephen Colbert. The New York Times also included it among its historical fiction reading recommendations.

== Stage adaptation ==
A stage adaptation titled Elolliset premiered on the small stage of the Helsinki City Theatre on 3 September 2026. It was adapted by Pipsa Lonka and directed by Juni Klein. The production was a collaboration between the theatre and the WAUHAUS arts collective.
