= Whole Travel =

American travel search engine

Whole Travel is a travel search engine website based the in United States. Launched in 2008, it aggregates information from thousands of other travel sites and evaluates each destination's sustainability to help users find and book sustainable vacations. The service combines search results from hotel websites, online travel agencies, local consolidators, and other sources such as larger hotel chains.

The company was established in September 2006 by a group of recent Stanford University graduates. It is headquartered in Palo Alto, California.

== Business model ==
It does not sell directly to the consumer; rather, it aggregates results from other sites and redirects visitors to one of these sites to complete their bookings. Thus, it makes money from pay-per-click advertising when the consumer clicks through to one of the supplier websites. In addition, it offers hotels and resorts the option to use a subscription model that provides entry into the online travel market.

== Whole Ranking ==
Whole Ranking is a metric for comparing the sustainability of multiple hotels. Whole Travel developed the system with non-profit organizations such as Rainforest Alliance and academics at Stanford University. Each hotel receives a Level 1-5 ranking based on their sustainability practices in four key areas:

1. Environmental Management
2. Economic Management
3. Customer Interaction
4. Social and Cultural Support
