= Daniel Katz =

Daniel Katz, Dan Katz or Danny Katz may refer to:

- Daniel Katz (psychologist) (1903–1998), American psychologist
- Daniel Katz (environmental activist) (born 1961), American environmentalist writer, speaker and activist
- Daniel Katz (politician) (born 1961), Argentine politician
- Daniel Katz (writer) (born 1938), Jewish-Finnish writer
- Dan Katz (born 1987), American lawyer
- Dan Katz (podcaster) (born 1985), American podcaster
- Danny Katz (born 1963), Australian columnist and author
