= Seppo Telenius =

Finnish writer and historian (born 1954)

- Born: Seppo Sakari Telenius; 16 February 1954 (age 71); Porvoo, Finland
- Occupation(s): writer, historian

Seppo Sakari Telenius (born 16 February 1954, in Porvoo, Finland) is a Finnish writer and historian who lives in Harjavalta. He studied political history, sociology, social history, aesthetics and economic history at the University of Helsinki (Master of Social Sciences 1981, Licentiate in Social Sciences 1988). His varied body of works includes novels, short stories, poems, local history books as well as essays. In many writings Seppo Telenius deals with topics related to human beings' relationship with themselves and the world, borders between reality and illusion, and the problem of loving. He has admired persons like Mary Magdalene, Hypatia, James P. Cannon and Juliet Mitchell.

In December 2003 Seppo Telenius attended a course in astronomy at Helsinki University under the name of "The Universe Now", receiving his diploma with the note "very good". Galaxies and field armies symbolize important ideas, events, or themes in his novels and short stories. Seppo Telenius' most important work has been the novel Auringolla ratsastajat (Riders on the Sun). Jouni Inkala has written to Seppo Telenius:

"...I found irony and the further I found the further I went towards the end of the manuscript [Auringolla ratsastajat] also a great deal of grotesque. In fact, you seem to have control over quite a big arsenal of different sorts of parody and satire that enrich your story with just the right spices. You do have control over cultural historical code, terms and dealings in such an amount that in between also my own knowledge of the field was put to a tough test.

As especially delicate, I found those many parts in which you freely mix the conventions and events of myth and so-called reality. Many details I first regarded as superficial then suddenly became depth in a dazzling way. Around the story seemed to be born an almost terrifying amount of time-spatial dimension..."

== Works ==
- Naisten vapautusliike Yhdysvalloissa vuosina 1967-1975. Licentiate thesis/theses. University of Helsinki, 1988. SUBJECT: The women's liberation movement in the United States of America during the years 1967-1975.
- Auringolla ratsastajat (Riders on the Sun), a novel. Goddess Artemis Ltd., 1995 and 1996. Books on Demand GmbH, 2011.
- Viasvesi. Goddess Artemis Ltd., 1998. SUBJECT: Chronicle of Viasvesi (which has been since 1967 a part of Pori).
- Korseletti (Corselette), a compilation of poetry and short stories. Goddess Artemis Ltd., 2000.
- Kartanokulttuurin jäänteillä. Goddess Artemis Ltd., 2001. SUBJECT: Kartanonmäki and Pinomäki in Pori.
- Kartano "Lotinanpellosta" esikaupunkialueeksi. [Pori]: Kartanon pienkiinteistönomistajat, 2003. SUBJECT: Chronicle of Kartano [which has been since 1941 a part of Pori).
- Hyvelä: Kalavesistä viljapeltoihin. [Pori]: Hyvelän kiinteistöyhdistys, [2005]. SUBJECT: History of Hyvelä (which has been since 1941 a part of Pori).
- Athena-Artemis: Goddesses Artemis and Athene (Athena), "Auringolla ratsastajat" (Riders on the Sun), and "Valtiatar Artemis" (Mistress Artemis). [Helsinki]: Kirja kerrallaan, 2005 and 2006.
- Poetry and other texts. [Helsinki]: Kirja kerrallaan, 2005 and 2007. Translated from the Finnish into English by Joop Wassenaar.
- Katinkurun ampumakeskus ja sen lähiympäristö: history of Katinkuru, Pinomäki, Honkaluoto etc. [Helsinki]: Kirja kerrallaan, 2008.
- Omakotien asialla: Porin Kiinteistönomistajain Keskusjärjestö 60 vuotta. [Pori]: Kehitys 2009.
- Harjavallan Haka ry vuosina 1963-2012: voimanoston huippuvuodet 1987-1994 sekä vilkasta junioritoimintaa 1964-1994 ja 1997-2006. [Harjavalta, Finland]: 2013.
- Katinkuru ja partiolainen Irja Linnea Kärkkäinen: Lippukuntia, hevosia, ampumaratoja, vesijättömaita. Books on Demand GmbH, 2016. SUBJECT: Irja Linnea Kärkkäinen (1909-2001), Girl Guiding and Girl Scouting, equestrianism, shooting ranges (firing ranges), Katinkuru, Pinomäki, Pori (Björneborg).
- Wow: the novel "Auringolla ratsastajat" and other texts. [Harjavalta, Finland]: Goddess Artemis Ltd., 2017.
- Kokoomuslaista paikallispolitiikkaa Harjavallassa vuosina 1919-2020. [Harjavalta, Finland]: 2020. SUBJECT: The National Coalition Party in Harjavalta during the years 1919-2020.

== See also ==
- Risto Heiskala, Iitu Inkilä, Seppo Telenius: Kodin ja päiväkodin yhteistyö ja kasvatusvastuun jakaminen. [Järvenpää]: Järvenpään kaupunki, 1982.
- Seppo Sakari Telenius and Mary Vol (eds.): Reflections. Goddess Artemis Ltd., 2002 and 2003. SUBJECT: Contains poems and other writings by Telenius and others, critical comments and an English translation of the Gospel according to Mary. Some contributions translated from the Finnish.
- Mary Vol and Seppo Telenius (eds.): Military writings. [Helsinki]: Kirja kerrallaan, 2009. SUBJECT: Jewish fighters; Trotsky and Finland; Military victories and economic results; Heckler & Koch rifles.
