= Heikki Turunen =

Finnish author (born 1945)

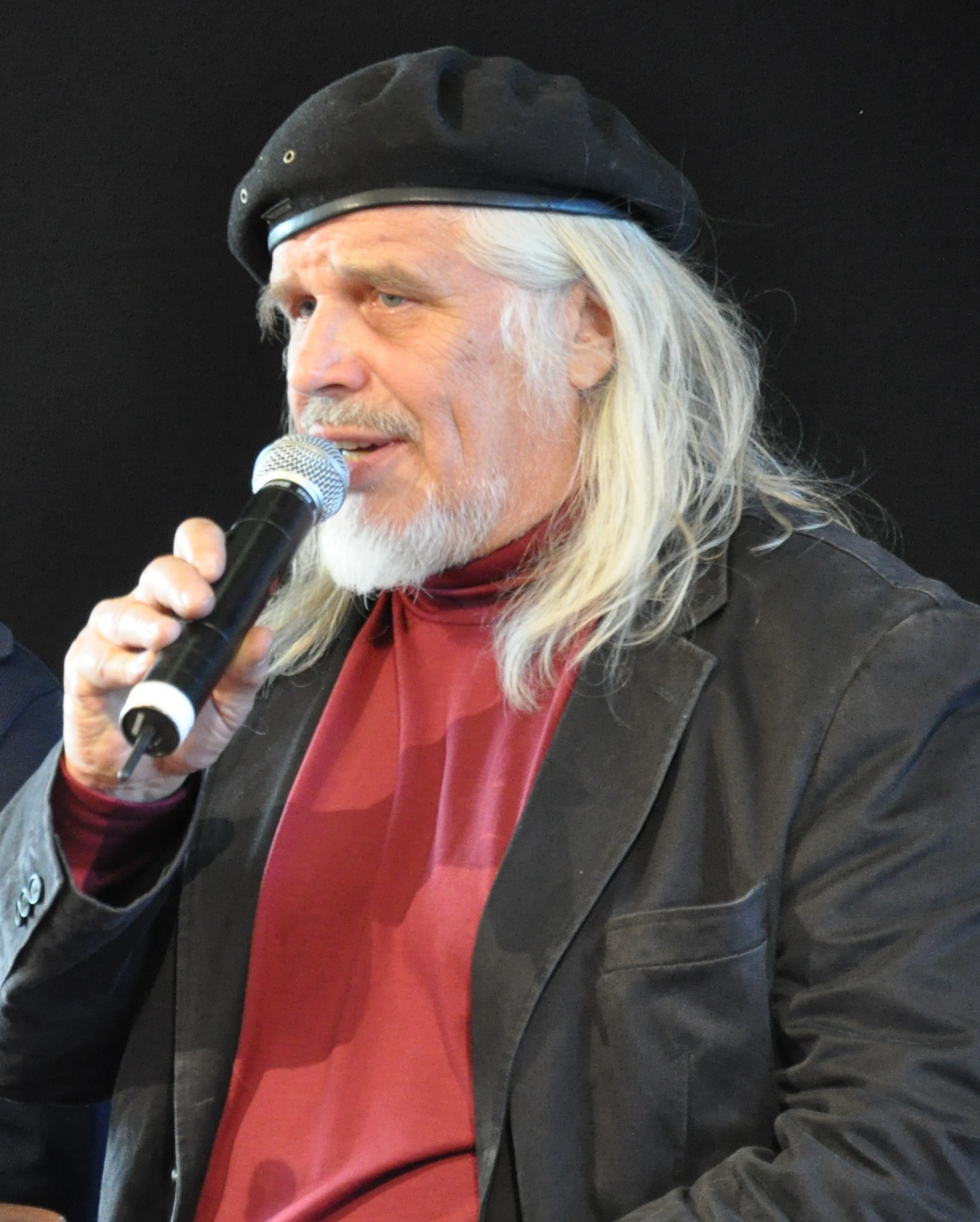
Heikki Turunen (2009)

Heikki Anton Turunen (born 9 December 1945) is a Finnish author who currently lives in Juuka, although he has resided for many years of his life in Joensuu prior.

He was born in Pielisjärvi, North Karelia, and grew up with his six sisters in a farming family. In 1964 he got a job as a journalist at Karjalan Maa newspaper in Joensuu. He kept this job until 1974, in the last year, as editor. He has been stated to have written many of his books in Juuka on the shore of the lake Pielinen.

Turunen's writing deals with Finland in the time in which he grew up, before urbanisation, industrialisation, and tenant farmers. He often describes characters who are a little unusual. Many of his books have been filmed.

The municipality of Juuka applied for an honorary cultural advisors title to be admitted to him in 2023 for his contributions to literature along with the help of the municipalities of Nurmes, Lieksa, Joensuu and the publisher WSOY.

== Bibliography ==
- Simpauttaja (1973; J. H. Erkko Award)
- Joensuun Elli (1974)
- Kivenpyörittäjän kylä (1976)
- Hupeli (1978)
- Soakkunoita susirajalta (1979)
- Kolmen hevosen mies (1981)
- Punahongan hehku (1982)
- Mustarinnan lapset (1985)
- Maan veri (1987)
- Turusen pyssystä (1988)
- Karhunpäinen metsänvartija (1992)
- Maalainen (1994)
- Hojo, hojo (1995)
- Seitsemän kurvin suora (1998)
- Kaikkitietävän tasavalta (2000)
- Jumalan piika (2002)
- Orpopojan valssi (2003)
- Yö kevään kuun, (2005)
- Pohjoinen ulottuvuus (2007)
