= Elín Hall =

Icelandic-Canadian musician and actress (born 1998)

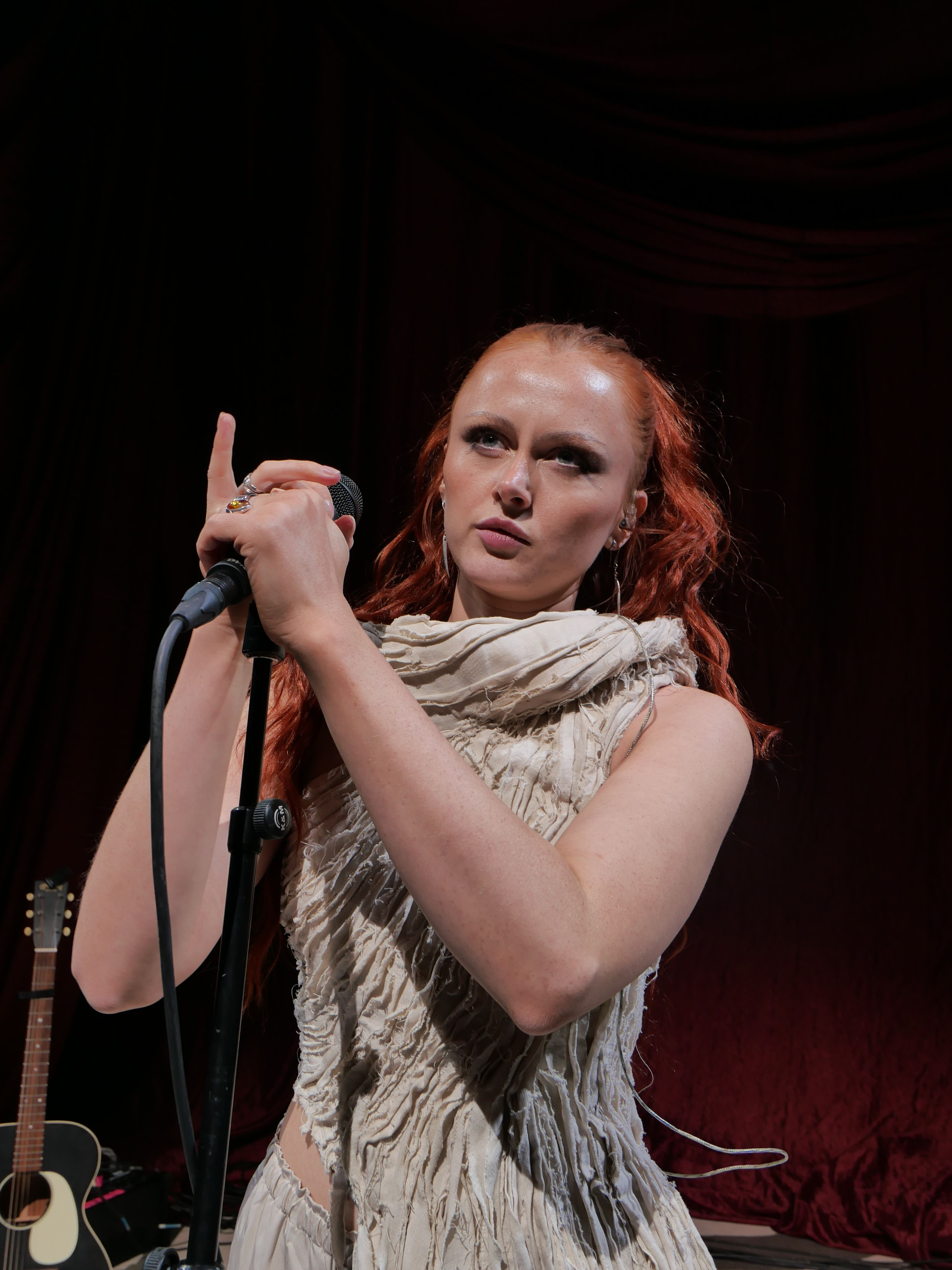
- Elín Hall in 2026
- Born: Elín Sif Halldórsdóttir; 11 July 1998 (age 28); Montreal, Canada
- Occupations: Actor; Musician
- Website: www.elinhall.com

Elín Hall is an Icelandic-Canadian musician and actress. She has released two studio albums, Með Öðrum Orðum (2020) and Heyrist í mér? (2023), and has appeared in films including Let Me Fall (2018), Cold (2023), and When the Light Breaks (2024).

== Early life and education ==
Hall was born in Montréal to Icelandic parents and raised primarily in Reykjavík. Her father is a geophysicist and her mother is a professor of music education. She trained in classical ballet until the age of 15 before turning her attention to music and acting.

Hall graduated from the acting programme at the Iceland University of the Arts in 2022.

== Music career ==
Hall released her debut studio album, Með Öðrum Orðum, in 2020. Her second album, heyrist í mér?, followed in November 2023. Three songs from the album reached number one on the Rás 2 chart. The album received three nominations at the Icelandic Music Awards and was named Album of the Year at the 2024 Reykjavík Grapevine Music Awards.

In March 2025, Hall released Fyllt í eyðurnar, a live EP recorded at Hljóðriti studio.

Hall subsequently began recording her first English-language material at Eastcote Studios in London with producer Martin Terefe. Her first English-language single, “Heaven to a Heathen”, was released in June 2025, followed by “Wolf Boy” and a version of David Bowie’s “As the World Falls Down”.

In January 2026, Hall released “Tachylite”, produced by Terefe and co-written with Jamie Woon. The title refers to volcanic glass and was partly inspired by the work of Hall’s father as a geophysicist and volcanic-eruption first responder.

== Acting career ==
Hall received her first professional screen role after appearing in Söngvakeppnin, Iceland’s selection competition for the Eurovision Song Contest, as a teenager. She subsequently appeared in the television series Case.

She played Magnea in Baldvin Zophoníasson’s drama film Let Me Fall (2018). Her performance earned her a nomination for Actress of the Year at the Edda Awards.

In 2023, Hall appeared in Cold, a film based on a novel by Yrsa Sigurðardóttir. She also contributed the song “rauðir draumar” to the film’s closing credits and received a second Edda nomination for her performance.

Hall starred as Una in Rúnar Rúnarsson’s When the Light Breaks (2024). The film opened the Un Certain Regard section of the 2024 Cannes Film Festival. Hall received the Silver Hugo for Best Actress at the 2024 Chicago International Film Festival and won Actress of the Year in a Leading Role at the 2025 Edda Awards.

In 2025, Hall portrayed a young Vigdís Finnbogadóttir in the television miniseries Vigdís. That year, she was also selected as one of European Film Promotion’s ten European Shooting Stars and was presented at the Berlin International Film Festival. She later received an Edda Award for Best Actress in a Leading Role (TV) for her performance in Vigdís.

Hall has also performed in Icelandic stage productions, including the musical Níu líf.

== Live performances and festivals ==
Hall has performed at music festivals and showcase events including Bludfest, The Great Escape in Brighton, NXNE in Toronto and WFNM in Los Angeles. She has appeared as a supporting act for The Smashing Pumpkins, Yungblud and Laufey.

== Discography ==
=== Studio albums ===
- Með Öðrum Orðum (2020)
- heyrist í mér? (2023)

=== Live EPs ===
- fyllt í eyðurnar (2025)

=== Selected singles ===
- “Heaven to a Heathen” (2025)
- “Wolf Boy” (2025)
- “As the World Falls Down” (2025)
- “Tachylite” (2026)

== Awards and nominations ==
Year	Organization	Category	Work	Result
2019	Edda Awards	Actress of the Year	Let Me Fall	Nominated
2024	Reykjavík Grapevine Music Awards	Album of the Year	heyrist í mér?	Won
2024	Icelandic Music Awards	Three categories	heyrist í mér?	Nominated
2024	Edda Awards	Actress of the Year	Cold	Nominated
2024	Chicago International Film Festival	Silver Hugo Award for Best Actress	When the Light Breaks	Won
2025	Edda Awards	Edda Award for Best Leading Actress	When the Light Breaks	Won
2026	Edda Awards	Edda Award for Best Leading Actress – Television	Vigdís	Won
2025	European Film Promotion	Shooting Stars Award	-	Selected
