= Katri Lipson =

Finnish writer (born 1965)

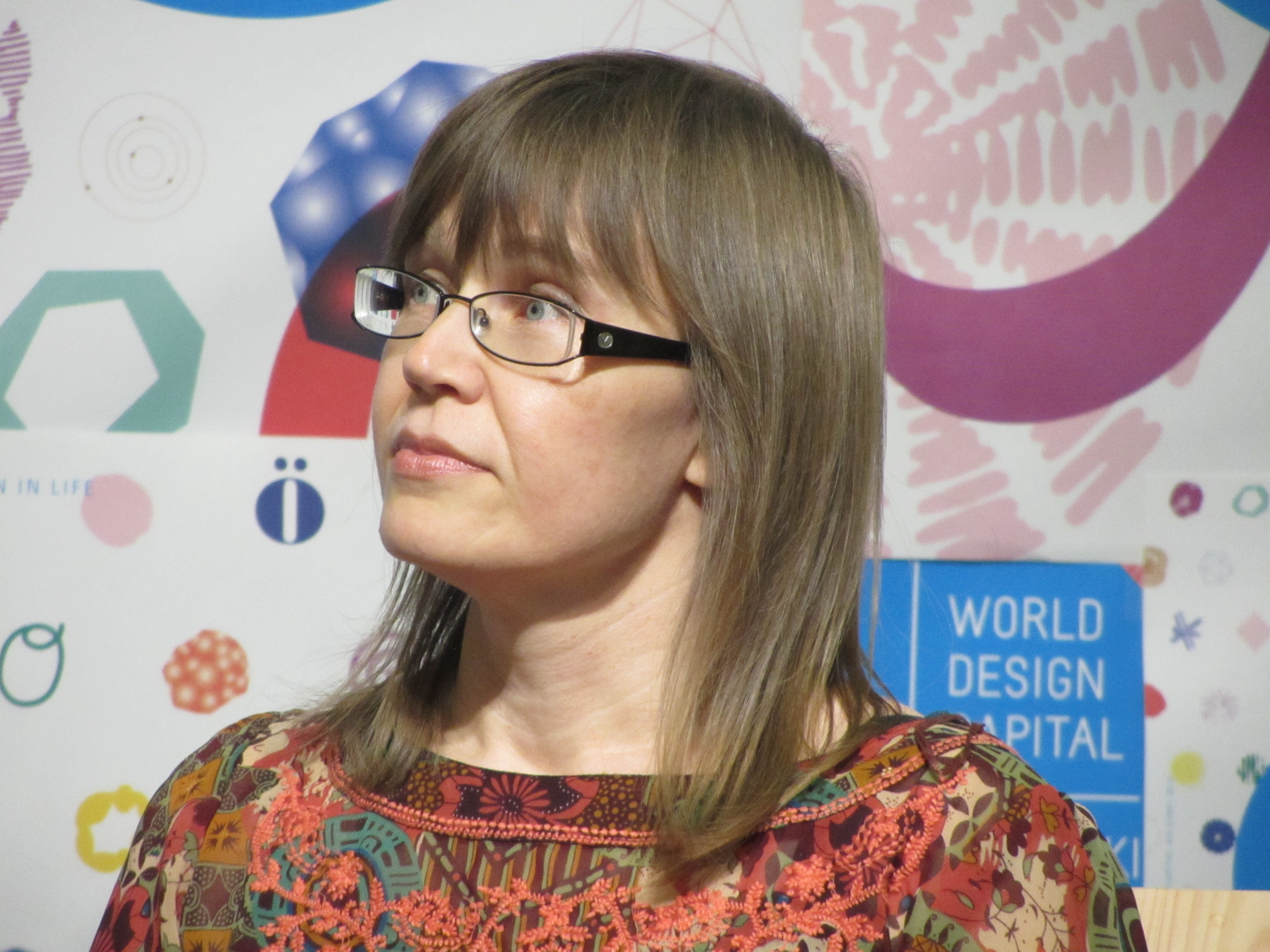
- Lipson in 2012
- Born: 1965 (age 60–61); Helsinki, Finland
- Occupation: Finnish writer

Katri Lipson (born 1965 in Helsinki) is a Finnish writer and doctor. She studied medicine at Uppsala University, graduating in 1993. Since then, she has worked as a doctor in Finland, Sweden and Kenya. Her debut novel Cosmonaut (Kosmonautti, 2008) was shortlisted for the Finlandia Prize in 2008 and won the Helsingin Sanomat Debut Book of the Year Award that same year. Her second novel, The Ice Cream Man (Jäätelökauppias, 2012), won the EU Prize for Literature in 2013. The novel, which takes place in former Czechoslovakia, was published in Czech in 2014. It has also been published in English and 12 other languages. Lipson's third novel, Detroit, was published in 2016. Lipson's fourth novel, Marienbad (Kaikkein haikein leikki) was published in 2019.

Lipson lives in Vantaa, Finland.
