= The Dabster =

Novel by Heikki Turunen

- Original Finnish book cover.
- Author: Heikki Turunen
- Original title: Finnish: Simpauttaja
- Language: Finnish
- Publisher: WSOY
- Publication date: 1973
- Publication place: Finland
- Media type: Print (Hardback)
- Pages: 303
- ISBN: 951-0-05877-7

The Dabster (Finnish: Simpauttaja) is a 1973 Finnish debut novel by Heikki Turunen. The novel received the 1973 J. H. Erkko Prize for best debut work, and in 1974, novel won the Thanks for the Book Award Medal.

The main character of the story, set in North Karelia, is a young country boy, Imppa Ryynänen, who leaves his home farm to seek his fortune. After arriving at the largest house in the village, Pirtamo, to make french drains, he meets a mysterious farm worker named "Simpauttaja". In Finnish, the word "simpauttaja" (Finnish: [ˈsimpɑu̯tːɑjɑ]) means a person who helps or supports another person or group.

According to Turunen, one of the characters in the novel, the protagonist's younger brother, Otto Ryynänen, who is described as a village lunatic, was based on a real person; while working as a journalist before his career as a writer, Turunen had met a young man suffering from mental health problems in Liperi in 1968, whose passion was sculpting skillful female statues, and wrote an article about him for the Karjalan Maa magazine. In 2012, Turunen learned that a young man he had interviewed decades earlier had been admitted to a mental hospital and, about 6–7 years after the publication of his novel, had escaped from there and committed suicide by jumping under a train in Kontiolahti. After hearing about the incident, he decided to write a sequel to the novel, Karjalan kuningas ("The King of Karelia"), which was published in 2014.

A television film adaptation of the same name based on the novel was made in 1975. Director Veikko Kerttula won the Jussi Award for Best Director for his film. A play has also been written based on the novel.
