= Rift (2017 film) =

2017 Icelandic film

- Film poster
- Directed by: Erlingur Thoroddsen
- Written by: Erlingur Thoroddsen
- Produced by: Baldvin Kári; Búi Baldvinsson; Jóhann Sigurðsson
- Starring: Björn Stefánsson; Sigurður Þór Óskarsson; Aðalbjörg Árnadóttir; Guðmundur Ólafsson
- Cinematography: John Wakayama Carey
- Edited by: Erlingur Óttar Thoroddsen
- Release date: 4 February 2017 (GFF)
- Running time: 109 minutes
- Country: Iceland
- Language: Icelandic

Rift (Icelandic: Rökkur) is a 2017 Icelandic psychological thriller-horror film written and directed by Erlingur Thoroddsen. It stars Björn Stefánsson and Sigurður Þór Óskarsson as a gay couple who must address their fractured relationship whilst experiencing disturbing events at a remote cabin in Iceland.

Rift premiered at the Gothenburg Film Festival, where it was chosen as the closing film. Erlingur received the Award for Artistic Achievement for Rift at Outfest in 2017.

== Plot ==
Ex-boyfriends Gunnar and Einar meet on a balcony during a party. The two discuss their ended relationship, Gunnar taking a positive outlook while Einar explains that time heals all but wounds. He leans his beer bottle on the railing of the balcony, asking Gunnar if he could save the bottle if it was him, before tipping it over the edge and smashing it on the ground.

Some time later, Gunnar is awoken from his sleep by a phone call from Einar. In it, Einar is distressed and mentions that he is at his family vacation home , Rökkur, and feels as though something or someone is with him in the dark. Gunnar leaves his new boyfriend to check on Einar, fearing he may be in danger.

Gunnar spends the early morning driving Rökkur. He repeatedly attempts to call Einar but cannot get through. On the road he passes a pulled over car, the owner of which stands near the hood and whose face Gunnar cannot see. Shortly after, Gunnar once again passes a person, this time with no car present. He pulls over but the person is no longer on the road.

The door to the house is open when Gunnar arrives. The house is a mess of trash, beer cans, and Christmas decorations. The house is empty. Gunnar finds a laptop and watches a self filmed video of Einar in a red jacket exploring outdoors. Einar appears happy and playful, and Gunnar laughs affectionately at the video. Afterwards, Gunnar exits the house and spots Einar sitting on a rock. He approaches and confronts Einar, who questions why Gunnar is there. Gunnar mentions the worrying phone call, which Einar plays off as him simply being drunk. When Gunnar asks why Einar wouldn’t reply to his phone calls, Einar says he has thrown his phone away.

Back in the house Einar begins to clean up the living area. He says he has been at the house for a few days, and that he came because there was something that happened there that he wanted to remember. During their conversation, the front door continually opens due to a broken latch. In the evening, Gunnar cooks dinner for them and Einar attempts warm conversation. Gunnar continually brushes off Einar’s advances, choosing to sleep in the guest bedroom away from Einar. Gunnar awakes in the middle of the night and is surprised by the sound of knocking on the front door. He and Einar approach, and Gunnar places an ear to the door. He can hear muffled voices but finds no one in sight when he opens the door.

The next day a neighbour, Gyða, visits while Einar is in the shower. She is suspicious of Gunnar, but relaxes when he says he’s a friend of the owners son and that he is also at the house. The neighbour mentions that there had been a rash or burglaries in the area and Gunnar posits that may have been the reason for the knocking the previous night.

Later that day, Gunnar and Einar get into a fight over Einar’s drinking. Tensions rise and Einar kicks Gunnar out. Gunnar drives into town and stops to get gas and coffee at a small gas station. The attendant continually stares at Gunnar, and when he confronts her about it she requests that he not pick up any hitchhikers on the road. Gunnar is unnerved by her strange behaviour and leaves. He wanders through the town and spots a red car that speeds past him. He then sees Einar in his red jacket walking through the fields.

Gunnar drives closer to where he spotted Einar and parks near an abandoned apartment building. He follows Einar into the nearby lava field but loses sight of him. He finds Einar’s phone on the ground and continues walking, stopping at a large rift in the ground. Einar appears beside him and asks why Gunnar is still there, to which Gunnar replies that he changed his mind on leaving. As they stand at the rift in the ground Einar tells a story of a group of sheep getting trapped inside during a snowstorm, where they turned to cannibalism by the time their farmers found them. When Gunnar turns to Einar he sees the man is gone. Looking around, he watches Einar turn a corner behind the abandoned apartment building.

Gunnar follows Einar inside and searches the destroyed housing, but reaches a dead end without finding Einar. Outside the window Gunnar sees the same red car from earlier. Einar jumps from a closet and scares Gunnar. The two share a short kiss which Gunnar breaks away from. The two hear the door slam shut and muffled voices downstairs. Einar asks that they wait silently, and they hear sounds like moaning. Einar laughs thinking the people downstairs are having sex. The noises quickly turn concerning as the two hear banging and grunts of effort. Gunnar sees someone run by the door of their room. The door downstairs opens and slams shut, and the red car drives off. Gunnar searches the house but finds nothing but piles of clothes and more empty rooms.

Gunnar and Einar return back to the house and enjoy drinks and music together. Einar tells a story of his imaginary friend Leemoy leading him into the lava field when he was 5 years old and abandoning him there. He is certain if things were slightly different he would have died. At the conclusion of his story, a creeking sound is heard outside. The two run through the front door to check but find no one.

That night, Gunnar dreams he sees a man standing by a blue house. His own hand is dripping with blood. He awakes from his dream and heads downstairs to get a drink. As he is standing in the kitchen, the front door opens once again. He closes it, and returns to the kitchen to see Einar sleepwalking outside in nothing but his underwear. He hurriedly brings Einar inside and attempts to wake him.

The next morning Gunnar questions when Einar’s sleepwalking started happening again. Einar says it happens when he is stressed. Worried that Einar is still not being truthful about the night he called Gunnar, Gunnar charges Einar’s phone and finds texts and pictures of another man. He confronts Einar about lying and asks who the man is and if Einar met him. Einar is adamant that he went to meet the man, but hid and saw the man was not who he said he was. He then went back to the house and no longer contacted the man. Einar gets upset at Gunnar for trying to control who he sees and Gunnar leaves the house.

Gunnar visits Gyða at her farm. Gunnar asks if any burglaries have happened lately or any strangers have been around. Gyða assures him that the area is safe and she can’t think of anyone that would be coming to the house and knocking. Before he leaves, she mentions that an old man lives on a nearby farm and is rumoured to have tried to take advantage of his male farm hands.

Gunnar drives to the farm house and it appears to be the same building from his dream. He knocks, but no one answers. Gunnar finds a basement window where he sees a photo of a shirtless man on a dresser. He leaves the farm house but doesn’t see as the old man inside watches him go.

Gunnar finds Einar sitting on a gravel beach by the ocean. Einar mentions he found old photos of them on his phone despite him thinking he deleted them all. Einar reveals he visited the vacation house to ground himself because he had been feeling unwell, and says he finally remembered what he had been trying to think of when he arrived. Gunnar asks what it is, and Einar, instead of answering, asks what Gunnar remembers from their last summer at Rökkur together.

Back at the house, Einar continues to ask Gunnar what he remembers of their last day together. Gunnar appears distressed and doesn’t understand why it’s important to recall what happened. He relents, and describes what he remembers.

In a flashback, Gunnar and Einar find an old house. Gunnar is kissing Einar, who hesitates and asks Gunnar to describe his first time. Gunnar will only divulge that he was too young, but Einar is upset that he will not reveal more. Gunnar then leaves the house and sees a young boy, who removes his hat and runs away into the field. In present time, Gunnar seems reluctant to share this memory but Einar pushes him to reveal more details.

Einar describes a different ending to the incident, saying that he saw no one else there and that Gunnar was standing unresponsive in the field. Gunnar refuses to divulge more despite Einar’s efforts and the two fight over why their relationship ended. Einar admits he was hoping that bringing Gunnar to Rökkur would give them a second chance, and Gunnar reveals he’s in a committed relationship. The fight escalates and Einar threatens to throw a pot of boiling water at Gunnar. Einar stops himself and goes to his room.

That night, Gunnar silences a call from his boyfriend. He hears Einar call to him, and Gunnar gets into Einar’s bed. The two cuddle and Gunnar finally tells Einar about his first time. Gunnar describes meeting an older man online when he was 17. Upon arriving to the man’s house to meet him, the man was older than expected and another man was inside as well. The two older men gave Gunnar alcohol and a third man entered with a camera to film them. The men gang raped Gunnar and each kissed him before letting him leave. Gunnar describes his conflicting feelings about the situation despite how horrible the act was. Einar comforts Gunnar and ensures him that he was never intending to kill himself despite his ideations. The two kiss and have sex.

Later that night Gunnar awakes to an empty bed. He searches the house and yard for Einar but cannot find him. Gunnar gets into his car to search and sees someone standing in the field. When he turns back to look for them, the person runs away. Gunnar loses the person in the darkness but finds a camera that had been dropped on the ground.

Gunnar returns to the house and watches the contents of the camera on a laptop. The video is in night vision, and shows Einar waking and leaving their bed earlier that night. In the video, Einar turns the camera to show Gunnar asleep in bed before leaving the house and walking to the abandoned apartment building. He enters and walks to the area of the house that they had heard noises in when they had last visited. Einar places the camera on the ground and a second pair of feet enter the frame. Gunnar hears muffled voices on the camera and the other person reaches down and grabs the camera, stopping the recording. Gunnar rewatches the footage and notices a hand slide under the bed when Einar turns the camera to show Gunnar asleep.

Gunnar realises the person may still be in the house and he slowly enters the bedroom. He crouches down the look under the bed when a figure appears behind him holding a shovel. Gunnar turns around and finds Gyða who is equally nervous, saying she woke up to someone screaming and came to investigate. Gunnar shares that Einar is missing, and Gyða joins Gunnar in the search.

In the car, Gyða shares that she visited the cabin the day before Gunnar arrived and no one answered. She mentions she came back in the evening but that no one was at the house. Worried, she asks when Gunnar last saw Einar and mentions that sometimes people hallucinate in the wilderness.

Gunnar begins feeling unwell and asks to be let out of the car. Gyða is hesitant but relents and leaves Gunnar on the road as the sun begins to rise. Gunnar finds his way back to the abandoned apartment building and enters. As he does, the red car pulls up to the building and Gunnar quickly heads inside, hiding in the same closet that Einar scared him from, though the door will not latch closed. Outside, an old man walks through the house searching for him. The man finds Gunnar and attempts to open the door, but Gunnar overpowers him and tells him to leave. The man pauses and says he was simply looking for “him”, that he thought “he” may have returned to the house. The old man then leaves and Gunnar hears the car drive away.

Gunnar hears the voice of a young boy and calls to him. The boy responds and tells Gunnar that he is stuck and doesn’t know where his parents are. The boy reveals himself to be named Leemoy, which is the same name as Einar’s childhood friend.

Gunnar exits his closet and searches the house for Leemoy. The boy appears to be in the same room that Einar had walked to, and Gunnar sees movement under a pile of blankets and garbage bags in the corner. The pile surges forward and knocks Gunnar over, who hits his head on the ground and passes out. When he awakes, he sees Einar sitting in the room in his red jacket making the phone call that Gunnar received many nights ago. Gunnar calls to him, but Einar leaves the room without responding. Once outside, Gunnar loses Einar again and heads into the lava field towards the rift. He looks down into it and sees Einar in his red jacket lying at the bottom. Gunnar climbs down to find that Einar is dead, and appears to have died a while ago. Gunnar assumes that Einar jumped into the rift, killing himself.

However, Gunnar finds a bloody rock in the ground and inspects Einar’s body. He sees a large wound on the back of his head, and turns to see the old man standing over him holding a box cutter. The man raises the weapon and begins attacking Gunnar, who does not fight back and instead raises his hands in surrender. Shocked, the old man retreats. Gunnar collapses to the ground in shock, only for the old man to return and smash him over the head with a rock, causing Gunnar to black out.

Gunnar awakes in the rift with a large, bleeding wound on the back of his head. He walks back to the house, his hand bleeding as it was in his dream. He bandages his hand and retrieves his phone, calling the police to report Einar’s death. Gunnar drives out of town without receiving medical care and sees a hitchhiker in the road. He pulls over and the person knocks on his window.
