= The Dabster (film) =

1975 Finnish made-for-TV film directed by Veikko Kerttula

- Finnish DVD cover of The Dabster
- Finnish: Simpauttaja
- Genre: Comedy; Drama
- Based on: The Dabster by Heikki Turunen
- Teleplay by: Matti-Juhani Karila; Veikko Kerttula; Matti-Juhani Karila
- Directed by: Veikko Kerttula
- Starring: Ahti Kuoppala; Pekka Räty; Esko Hukkanen; Leni Katajakoski; Ahti Jokinen
- Country of origin: Finland
- Original language: Finnish

Production
- Production locations: Lieksa, North Karelia
- Cinematography: Raimo Väisänen; Kauko Nord
- Editor: Keijo Virtanen
- Running time: 151 minutes
- Production company: MTV Oy

Original release
- Network: Mainostelevisio
- Release: February 17, 1975

The Dabster (Finnish: Simpauttaja) is a 1975 Finnish made-for-television comedy drama film, directed by Veikko Kerttula, based on the 1973 novel of the same name by Heikki Turunen. The film tells the story of a skilled but mysterious worker who arrives in a rural village in North Karelia and, as a ruthless joker and womanizer, completely changes the village's everyday life.

The film was first shown on television on February 17, 1975, on Mainostelevisio, which also produced the film. Finnkino released the film in DVD format on August 21, 2009.

== Reception ==
Director Veikko Kerttula won the Jussi Award for Best Director for his film.

Jukka Kajava from Helsingin Sanomat recalled during the television re-run of the film on 1994 New Year's Eve how the bleakness of living conditions and lack of equality, dramatized from Turunen's novel 20 years earlier, were very much in keeping with the spirit of the times. "The remote village mentality of Finnish development areas and the minimal opportunities provided were powerfully and effectively conveyed to the general public." Kajava wrote that the film, despite its minor flaws, is a piece of television quality history.

== See also ==
- List of Finnish films of the 1970s
