= My Cat Yugoslavia =

2014 book by Pajtim Statovci

- First edition
- Author: Pajtim Statovci
- Original title: Kissani Jugoslavia
- Translator: David Hackston
- Language: Finnish
- Publisher: Helsinki: Otava (Finnish 1st ed.); UK: Pushkin Press (UK English 1st ed.); US: Pantheon Books (US English 1st ed.)
- Publication date: 2014
- Publication place: Finland
- English publication date: 2017

My Cat Yugoslavia (Finnish: Kissani Jugoslavia) is the first novel by Pajtim Statovci. The novel explores the lives of a woman in Kosovo and of her son as a refugee in Finland. The book was first published in Finnish in 2014 and in English in 2017. It received the 2014 Helsingin Sanomat Literature Prize. It was made into a play and staged at the Finnish National Theater in Helsinki in 2018.

== Background ==
Statovci was born in Kosovo to Muslim parents in 1990; his parents fled to Finland in 1992. His struggles with his dual identity influenced the creation of the novel. Statovci stated that Behemoth from The Master and Margarita influenced the character of the character, the cat Yugoslavia.

== Reception ==
The novel won the 2014 Helsingin Sanomat Literature Prize.

Téa Obreht, writing for the New York Times, called it a "strange, haunting and utterly original exploration of displacement and desire...“My Cat Yugoslavia” is a marvel, a remarkable achievement." A positive review from The Guardian stated "Pajtim Statovci’s debut novel flits between genres to create a memorably disconcerting tale about life as an outsider in modern Europe" and praised the translation.

The novel received a negative review from NPR, which criticized the structure of the novel and stated "My Cat Yugoslavia, though clever in parts, is, unfortunately, too unpolished and immature to be considered anything more than a valiant attempt."

The German version of the novel won the 2024 International Literature Award.
