= When the Light Breaks =

- Promotional poster
- Icelandic: Ljósbrot
- Directed by: Rúnar Rúnarsson
- Written by: Rúnar Rúnarsson
- Produced by: Heather Millard; Rúnar Rúnarsson
- Starring: Elín Hall
- Cinematography: Sophia Olsson
- Edited by: Andri Steinn Guðjónsson
- Production companies: Compass Films; Halibut; Revolver Amsterdam; MP Film Production; Eaux Vives Productions; Jour2Fête
- Distributed by: Jour2Fête (France)
- Release dates: 15 May 2024 (Cannes); 19 February 2025 (France)
- Running time: 80 minutes
- Countries: Iceland; Netherlands; Croatia; France
- Language: Icelandic

When the Light Breaks (Icelandic: Ljósbrot, lit. 'Refraction') is a 2024 drama film by Rúnar Rúnarsson. The film depicts a young woman grieving for her first love's death during one summer day.

It was selected as the opening film for the Un Certain Regard selection of the 2024 Cannes Film Festival, where it had its world premiere on 15 May 2024.

== Plot ==
The film's events take place over a single day in Iceland. It opens with Diddi and Una in the early stage of a relationship. They go from an ocean outlook to Diddi's house that he shares with mutual friend Gunni. They talk in bed. Diddi leaves early; Una, hearing Gunni come home, sneaks out. Jóhann Jóhannsson's requiem, "Odi et Amo" (Latin for "I Love and I Hate") plays, as an extended sequence of lights in the dark is revealed to be lighting in a road tunnel which is engulfed in an enormous fireball.

Later that morning, Una and Gunni meet at the arts college where they and Diddi study. Una has not heard about the tunnel disaster - the worst in Iceland's history - and then comforts Gunni as he reveals Diddi may have been in the tunnel at the time. The group of friends gather at a Red Cross centre, where they learn Diddi has died.

Una leaves, unable to process. After a brief reconciliation with her father, she rejoins the friends at a bar, where she meets Klara, Diddi's girlfriend. Klara reveals to Una that Diddi had said she was a lesbian, but Una reveals she is pansexual. She says her last relationship was with a man. A private conversation between Una and Gunni confirms that Una and Diddi were having a covert affair, but Diddi had told Gunni. Una confesses she resents Klara as Diddi's public girlfriend, while she must simply be the grieving friend as their relationship was covert.

The country, meanwhile, has fallen into national mourning for the tragedy. The friends go to an impromptu service of mourning at Hallgrímskirkja, Iceland's largest church. When Klara and Una leave the service for a cigarette, Klara disparages the performance art the friends were creating, but Una is able to show her how it reveals other perspectives.

They then go to one of their houses and have a tear-filled party. As the party ends, Una and Klara stand on either side of a glass door, their reflections merging. The film ends with them lying close together in bed. The film references the opening sequence by again playing "Odi et Amo" as a sequence of lights on water are revealed to be reflection of the setting sun on the ocean.

== Cast ==
- Elín Hall as Una
- Mikael Kaaber as Gunni
- Katla Njálsdóttir as Klara
- Ágúst Wigum as Bassi
- Gunnar Hrafn Kristjánsson as Siggi
- Baldur Einarsson as Diddi

== Production ==
When the Light Breaks is a co-production between Iceland, the Netherlands, Croatia and France. Heather Millard produced the film for Compass Films with Rúnar Rúnarsson's company Halibut, in co-production with Revolver Amsterdam, MP Film Production, Eaux Vives Productions and Jour2Fête.

== Release ==
Jour2Fête is scheduled to release the film in France on 19 February 2025. It was released in Iceland in August 2024.

== Reception ==
On the review aggregator website Rotten Tomatoes, 97% of 31 critics' reviews are positive. The website's consensus reads: "When the Light Breaks is a quietly powerful and deeply moving work of minimalist cinema, using its sparse narrative and sensory approach to craft an intimate, authentic portrait of grief." On Metacritic, the film has a weighted average score of 74 out of 100 based on 8 critics, which the site labels as "generally favorable" reviews.

== Accolades ==
Award	Date of ceremony	Category	Recipient(s)	Result	Ref.
Cabourg Film Festival	2024	Youth Jury Prize		Won	
Cannes Film Festival	2024	Un Certain Regard		Nominated	
Chicago International Film Festival	2024	Gold Hugo – Best Feature		Nominated	
Chicago International Film Festival	2024	Silver Hugo – Best Female Performance	Elín Hall	Won	
Cork International Film Festival	2024	Lookout Award		Won	
Cork International Film Festival	2024	Youth Jury Award – Feature Film		Won	
Edda Awards	2025	Film of the Year	When the Light Breaks	Won	
Edda Awards	2025	Director of the Year	Rúnar Rúnarsson	Won	
Edda Awards	2025	Best Actress in a Leading Role	Elín Hall	Won	
Edda Awards	2025	Best Actress in a Supporting Role	Katla Njálsdóttir	Won	
Edda Awards	2025	Visual Effects	Jörundur Rafn Arnarson, Christian Sjostedt	Won	
Edda Awards	2025	Best Costume Design	Helga Rós Hannam	Nominated	
Edda Awards	2025	Best Make Up	Evalotte Oosterop	Nominated	
Edda Awards	2025	Best Screenplay		Nominated	
Edda Awards	2025	Best Editing	Andri Steinn Guðjónsson	Nominated	
Edda Awards	2025	Best Cinematography	Sophia Olsson	Nominated	
Edda Awards	2025	Best Supporting Actor	Mikael Kaaber	Nominated	
Edda Awards	2025	Best Set Design	Hulda Helgadóttir	Nominated	
European Film Awards	2024	European Makeup & Hair	Evalotte Oosterop	Won	
Gijón International Film Festival	2024	Albar – Best Film		Nominated	
Golden Rooster Awards	2024	International Competition Award – Best Film		Nominated	
Golden Rooster Awards	2024	International Competition Award – Best Artistic Contribution Award	Sophia Olsson	Won	
Göteborg Film Festival	2025	Dragon Award – Best Nordic Film		Won	
International Film Festival for Children and Young Audience SCHLiNGEL	2024	Club of Festivals Youth – Best International Feature Film ("Youth Film")		Won	
International Film Festival for Children and Young Audience SCHLiNGEL	2024	Award of the Youth Jury – Best International Feature Film ("Youth Film")		Nominated	
International Film Festival for Children and Young Audience SCHLiNGEL	2024	Fairplay Award – Best National or International Feature Film ("Youth Film")		Nominated	
Lübeck Nordic Film Days	2024	Interfilm Church Prize – Best Film		Won	
Motovun Film Festival	2024	Propeller of Motovun – Best Film		Won	
Motovun Film Festival	2024	FIPRESCI Prize – Best Film		Won	
Munich International Film Festival	2024	ARRI/OSRAM Award – Best International Film		Nominated	
Nordic Council Film Prize	2025			Nominated	
Nuuk International Film Festival	2023	Jury Award – Best Feature Film	Heather Millard, Rúnar Rúnarsson	Won	
Oslo Pix	2024	Oslo Grand Pix – Best Nordic Fiction Film		Won	
Palić European Film Festival	2024	Palic Tower – Best Director	Rúnar Rúnarsson	Won	
SUBTITLE European Film Festival	2024	Angela Award – Outstanding Achievement: Acting	Elín Hall	Won	
