= Juha K. Tapio =

Finnish writer and critic (born 1957)

Juha K. Tapio (born October 17, 1957) is a Finnish writer and critic whose only novel, Frankensteinin muistikirja (Frankenstein's Notebook, 1996; no foreign translations thus far have been published) was awarded the Helsingin Sanomat Literary Prize for the best Finnish first novel of 1996. The novel is a metafiction written as a kind of sequel to Mary Shelley's novel Frankenstein; or, the Modern Prometheus (1818).

Tapio's novel begins in Paris in the 1920s, where two American expatriate writers, Gertrud Stein and Ernst Hemingway (the misspelling of the names is intentional) come across a strange manuscript, which appears to be a diary written by the monster created by Victor Frankenstein. They discover that the writer of the diary is currently living in Paris under the name Frank Stein. Their curiosity aroused, they arrange a meeting with Mr. Stein, who appears to be a rather amiable elderly gentleman, if somewhat rough-hewn in outward appearance - there is nothing monstrous about him at first sight.

The "monster" then tells the two writers his own story after having fled his father's castle; here the narrative mirrors the tale-within-tale structure of Shelley's original, inserting the monster's narrative into the main frame of the plot as a series of diary excerpts, whereas Shelley's novel uses a letter-novel format. The "monster," who is perhaps immortal, perhaps not (as practically everything else in the novel, this fact is clouded in uncertainty), relates his adventures through Europe in the 19th century, commenting on his way on the continent's political, economical and intellectual turmoil in that troubled century, as well as his own moral progress.

The main theme of the book is the complex relation and interchange between fact and fiction, original and copy, normality and abnormality (or even monstrosity). Another important theme is the nature of human identity. Moreover, the whole concept of originality in art and literature is questioned, as basically everything in human culture, including art, is tradition-based and thus indebted to various traditions, a kind of joint effort - whereas Western media and the press have always tended to emphasize the sovereignty of the individual artist/writer as a master of his/her own creation. Indeed, it would perhaps be more appropriate to think of the writer as a kind of receptacle, catalyst and organizer of a common meme-pool. As with Frankenstein's monster, who was put together piecemeal from dead body parts and then re-called to life, a work of art is also put together of hitherto unrelated "dead" elements, which together may form something new, vital, and unique.

In the novel, the point of view of the visual artist is dealt with using the character of Pablo Picasso and his more or less "monstrous" paintings.

Tapio has also published a handful of short stories in the Finnish science fiction and fantasy magazine Portti.
