= Pipers =

Pipers may refer to:

- People who play the bagpipes

== Places ==
- Pipers, California, a former settlement in the United States
- Pipers River, a river in Tasmania, Australia
- Pipers River, Tasmania, a township in Tasmania, Australia
- Pipers Island, island in the River Thames at Reading, England
- Pipers Creek (Seattle), stream in Seattle, Washington, United States
- Pipers Cove, community on Cape Breton Island, Nova Scotia, Canada
- Pipers Pool, a hamlet in Cornwall, England

== Standing stones ==
- The Pipers standing stones associated with the Hurlers stone circles, Minions, Cornwall, England
- The Pipers, St Buryan, standing stones associated with the Merry Maidens stone circle, St. Buryan, Cornwall, England

== See also ==
- Piper (disambiguation)
