= Iida Turpeinen =

Finnish writer (born 1987)

Iida Turpeinen (2024)

Iida Pauliina Turpeinen (born 1987) is a Finnish writer and scholar, who has written a number of short stories as well as the novel Beasts of the Sea.

== Biography ==
As a child, Turpeinen's mother worked at an environmental centre off the southern coast of Finland. Turpeinen would later do an internship at that research centre while in secondary school, collecting water samples for testing and managing bird populations on the island. She subsequently studied literature at the University of Helsinki. Her doctoral dissertation, on the intersection of scientific literature and works of fiction, is in preparation as of 2026.

In 2023, she published her debut novel Beasts of the Sea. The novel was both a commercial and critical success upon publication. A time-hopping historical novel, it deals with the discovery of Steller's Sea Cow and the resonances of that discovery in following centuries. The book won the Helsingin Sanomat Literature Prize and was nominated for the Finlandia Prize, the Torch-bearer Prize and shortlisted for the Best Foreign Book Prize (2024) in France. The translation rights have been sold in more than 20 languages, with the English translation due out in 2025 from Maclehose Press.
