= Pajtim Statovci =

Finnish novelist

Pajtim Statovci (born 1990) is a Finnish novelist. His debut novel, Kissani Jugoslavia, was published in 2014, winning the Helsingin Sanomat Literature Prize for best debut novel in Finnish for that year, and was published in 2017 as My Cat Yugoslavia in the UK and US. It was made into a play and staged at the Finnish National Theatre in Helsinki in 2018. His second novel, Tiranan sydän, won the Toisinkoinen Literature Prize for 2016, and was published as Crossing in the UK and the US in 2019. Following the 2019 release of his third novel, Bolla, his publisher announced in February 2024 the upcoming September release of his fourth, Lehmä Synnyttää Yöllä (English title: A Cow Gives Birth At Night).

== Early life ==
Statovci was born in Kosovo in 1990 to Albanian parents. In 1992, after the outbreak of war in Yugoslavia, of which Kosovo was a part and where Albanians were persecuted, his family fled to Finland. He studied comparative literature at the University of Helsinki and screenwriting at Aalto University School of Arts, Design and Architecture.

== Awards ==
- 2014: Shortlisted for the Young Aleksis Literature Prize
- 2014: Helsingin Sanomat Literature Prize (Best Debut)
- 2015: Shortlisted for the Flame Bearer Prize
- 2016: Toisinkoinen Literature Prize
- 2017: Shortlisted for the Future of Finnish Culture Award
- 2018: Helsinki Writer of the Year Award
- 2019: Finlandia Award winner for his third novel, Bolla
- 2019: Finalist for the National Book Award for Translated Literature for Crossing (translated by David Hackston)
- 2021: Nominated for the Kirkus Prize for Bolla
- 2024: Finlandia Award winner for his fourth novel, Lehmä synnyttää yöllä

== Bibliography ==
=== Novels ===
- Kissani Jugoslavia, Otava, 2014 (My Cat Yugoslavia, Pantheon Books, 2017; trans. David Hackston). ISBN 9789511269786 (Finnish); ISBN 9781782273608 (English).
- Tiranan Sydän, Otava, 2016 (Crossing, Pantheon Books, 2019; trans. David Hackston). ISBN 9789511305781 (Finnish); ISBN 9781524747497 (English).
- Bolla, Otava, 2019 (Bolla, Pantheon Books, 2021; trans. David Hackston). ISBN 9789511316824. (Note: Briefly reviewed in the September 13, 2021 issue of The New Yorker.)
- Lehmä synnyttää yöllä, Otava, 2024. ISBN 9789511357759 (Finnish).

———————
