= Boris Verho =

Finnish poet

Boris Verho is a Finnish poet.

== Professional career ==
He won the Helsingin Sanomat Literature Prize in 1985 for his collection of poems Varastossa aina palaa valo (There is always a light in the Warehouse, Arvi Karisto).
