= Telenius =

Telenius is a surname. Notable people with the surname include:

- Seppo Telenius (born 1954), Finnish writer and historian
- Vera Telenius (1912–1991), Finnish singer
