= Eira Stenberg =

Finnish playwright and writer (born 1943)

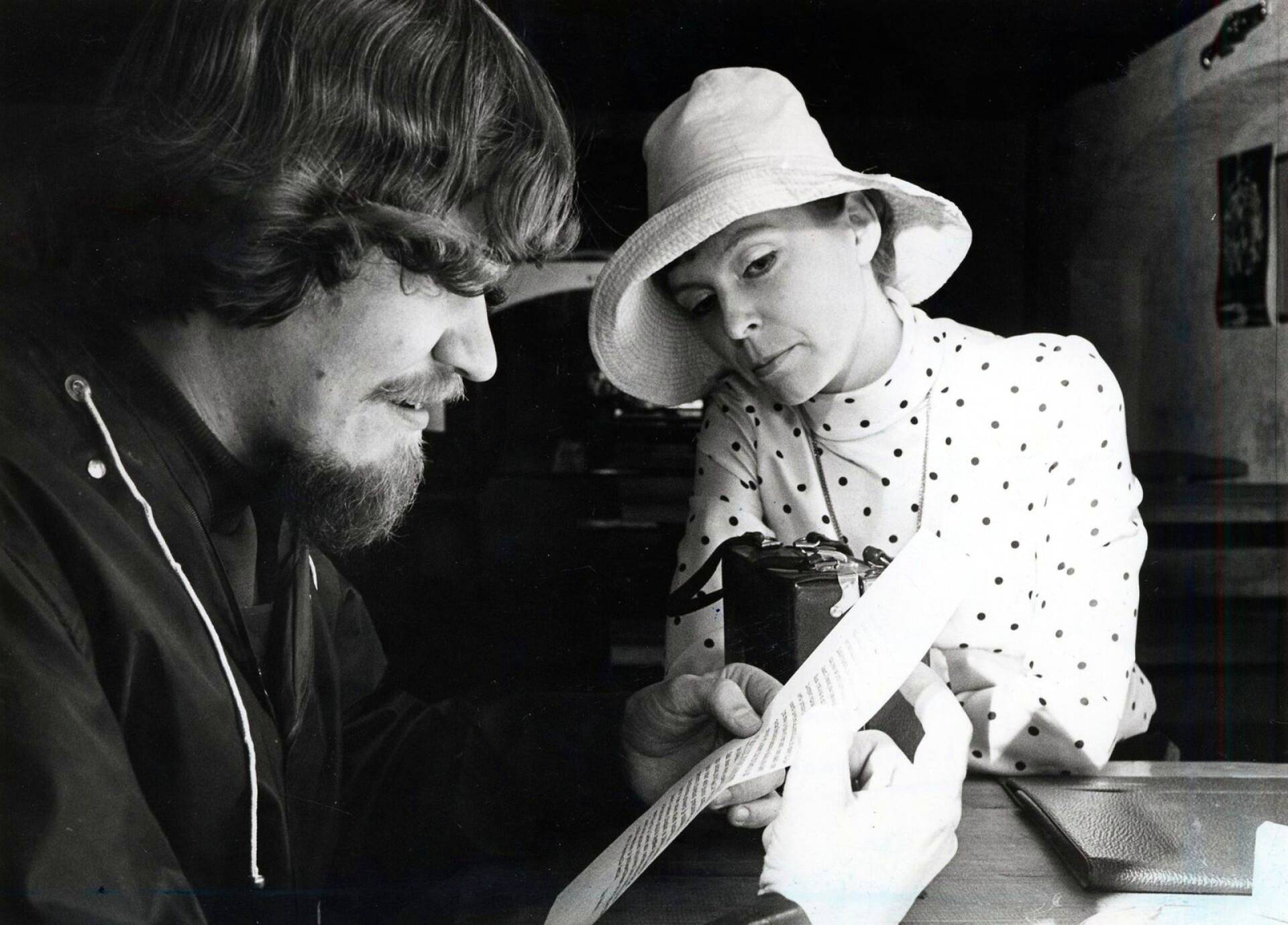
Eira Stenberg (right) and M. A. Numminen (1971)

Eira Margot Helene Stenberg (born April 8, 1943, in Tampere) is a Finnish playwright and writer and the recipient of the J. H. Erkko Award in 1966 for her debut collection of poetry Kapina huoneessa, and the Eino Leino Prize in 2007.
