= Erkka Filander =

Finnish poet

Erkka Filander (born 1993) is a Finnish poet. He is the youngest ever winner of the Helsingin Sanomat Literature Prize, awarded by the leading Helsinki newspaper for the best literary debut of the year. Filander won the prize for his collection Heräämisen valkea myrsky (The white storm of awakening).
