= The Piper (2023 film) =

- Release poster
- Directed by: Erlingur Thoroddsen
- Written by: Erlingur Thoroddsen
- Produced by: Jeffrey Greenstein; Bernard Kira; Yariv Lerner; Tanner Mobley; Les Weldon; Jonathan Yunger
- Starring: Charlotte Hope; Julian Sands; Aoibhe O’Flanagan; Oliver Savell
- Cinematography: Daniel Katz
- Edited by: Michael J. Duthie
- Music by: Christopher Young
- Production company: Millennium Media
- Distributed by: Samuel Goldwyn Films
- Release date: December 6, 2023
- Running time: 95 minutes
- Country: United States
- Language: English

The Piper is a 2023 American horror film written and directed by Icelandic filmmaker Erlingur Thoroddsen. The film stars Charlotte Hope and Julian Sands, and was one of the last films released prior to Sands’s death in 2023.

== Plot ==
Melanie Walker, a talented flautist performing under renowned conductor Gustafson, is preparing for an important orchestral concert when the sudden death of celebrated composer Katherine Fleischer throws the program into disarray. Gustafson had planned to premiere Katherine’s final concerto, but the score is nowhere to be found. Having once studied under Katherine, Melanie volunteers to locate the missing work. However, Katherine’s sister, Alice, insists that the composer never wanted the concerto performed and had attempted to destroy it before her death. Determined to recover the music, Melanie secretly enters Katherine’s villa and steals the manuscript, only to discover that the final movement is unfinished. Familiar with her former mentor’s creative methods, Melanie becomes convinced she can complete the concerto herself in time for the performance. As she works to reconstruct the missing passages, however, the music begins to exert a strange and disturbing influence on anyone who hears it. Increasingly unnerved by the score’s power, Melanie comes to suspect that its origins are connected to the ancient legend of The Pied Piper of Hamelin.

== Cast ==
- Charlotte Hope as Melanie Walker
- Julian Sands as Gustafson
- Aoibhe O’Flanagan as Zoe
- Oliver Savell as Colin
- Kate Nichols as Nancy
- Pippa Winslow as Alice Fleischer
- Louise Gold as Katherine Fleischer
- Boyan Anev as The Piper

== Production ==
Filming took place in Bulgaria. The Piper was the fourth film from Icelandic director Erlingur Thoroddsen who had previously made the horror films Child Eater (2016) and Rift (2017), and the thriller Cold (2023).

== Release ==
The film had its premiere at Screamfest in Los Angeles in late 2023, and was released in various territories in Europe later that same year, including Russia and Spain, before being released in the United States in March 2024.

== Music ==
The score for The Piper was by veteran composer Christopher Young, and was especially lauded by film music critics. The music was recognized by the International Film Music Critics Association, who named it Best Original Score for a Horror film, and Film Music Composition of the Year, and nominated it as Score of the Year. Jonathan Broxton of Movie Music UK stated that the score was "sensational… an encapsulation of everything that has ever made Young’s music great… a huge Gothic horror score for the full orchestra, choir, and various specialty instruments which is endlessly creative, compositionally and intellectually, and as well as being scary and chilling, also packs an emotional punch." Conrado Xalabarder of Mundo BSO described the score as "a powerful creation with symphonic and choral music for adults and children… it is deceptively innocent, it is macabre and insane, it causes madness and death… another of Christopher Young’s dazzling creations".
