= Kari Aronpuro =

Finnish poet

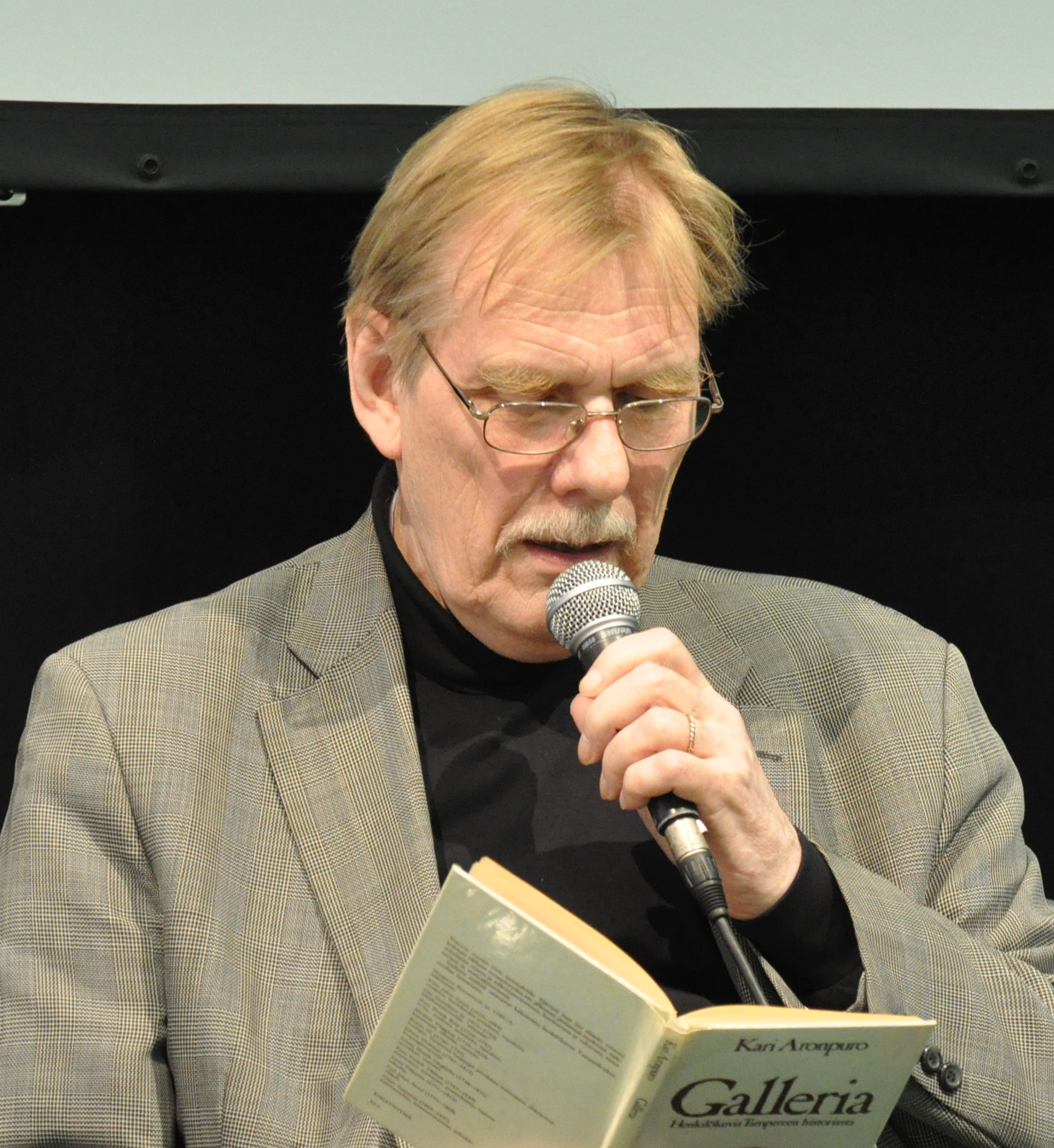
Kari Aronpuro

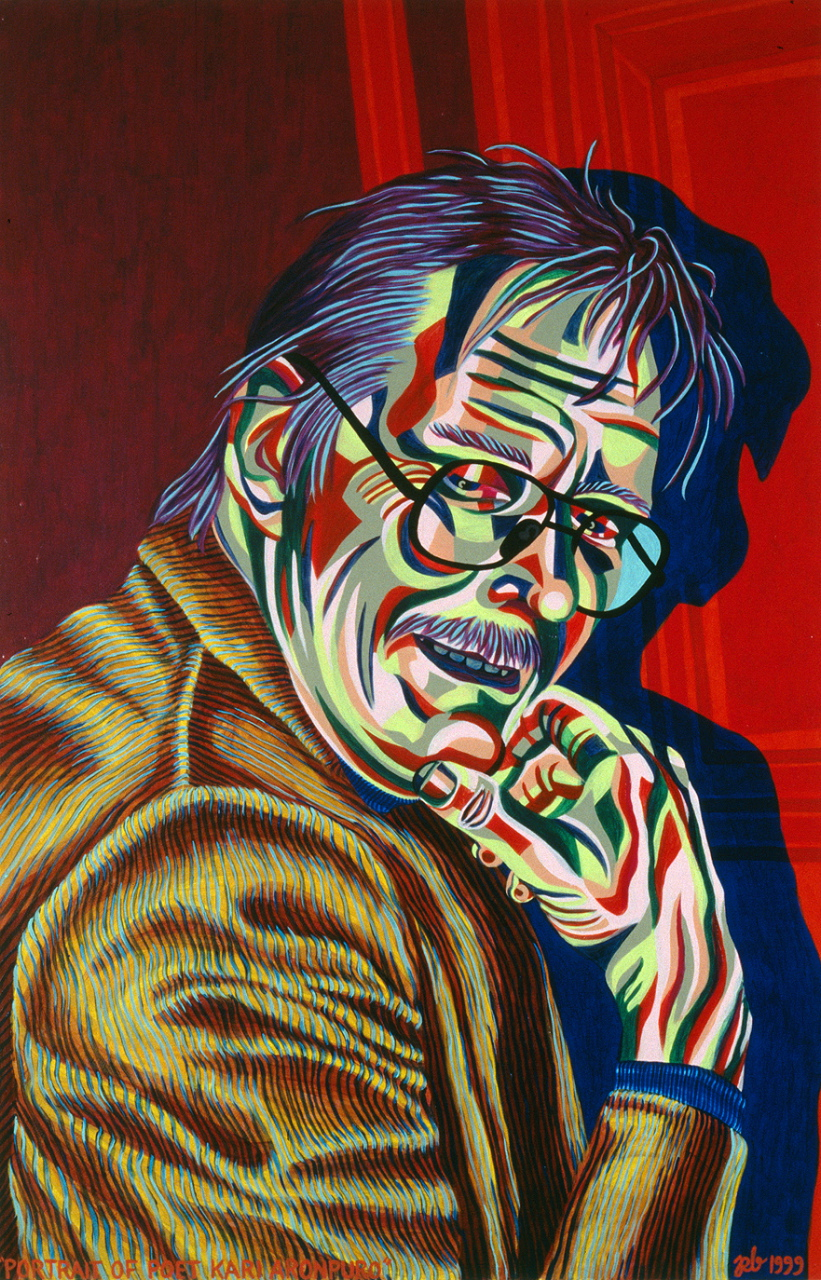
Portrait of Kari Aronpuro, 1999, 90 x 120 cm

Kari Aronpuro (born 30 June 1940) is a Finnish poet. He worked in the library industry for over 40 years. He worked as a librarian at the University of Tampere course library from 1964 to 1971, Rääkkylän municipal library in 1972, Kemin Syväkangas library from 1972 to 1981 and the Tampere Lamminpää library from 1981 to 2003.

== Awards and decorations ==
- 2004: Pro Finlandia Medal of the Order of the Lion of Finland
- 2011: Eino Leino Prize
- 1987: Runeberg Prize
- 1964: J. H. Erkko Award
