= Riku Korhonen =

Finnish writer and journalist

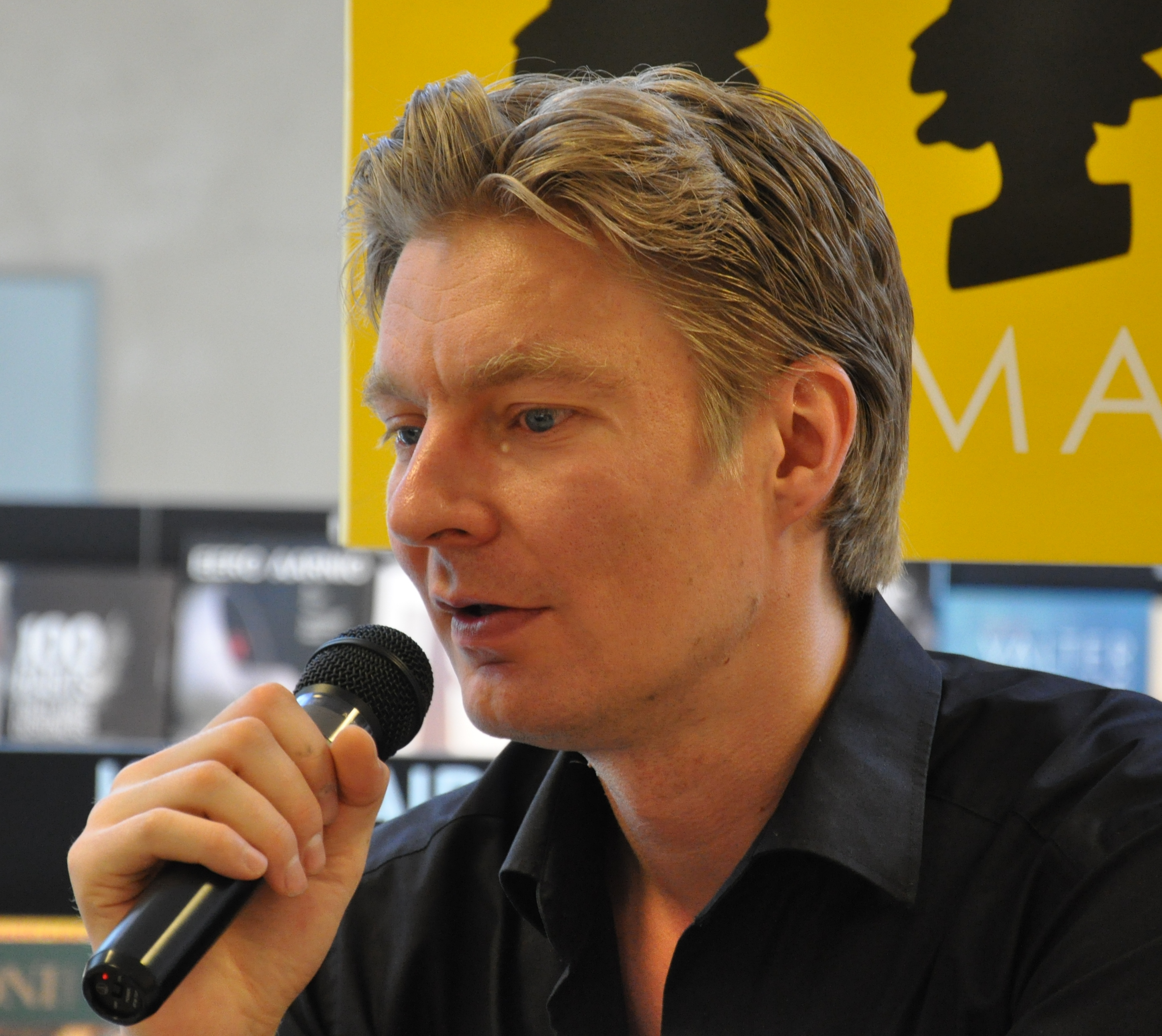
Portrait of Riku Korhonen

Riku Korhonen (born 1972) is a Finnish writer and journalist. Before turning to writing full-time, he taught creative writing at the University of Turku.

Korhonen's first novel Kahden ja yhden yön tarinoita was published in 2003 and won the Helsingin Sanomat Literature Prize. His second novel Lääkäriromaani won the Kalevi Jäntti prize and the EU Prize for Literature.

Korhonen writes regularly for the newspaper Helsingin Sanomat.

Korhonen usually writes on topics that are serious. But he does so in an amusing way, characterized by a strong narrative. He used to teach in a high school and a lecturer of creative writing at the University of Turku before he turned into a full-time writer and columnist. His debut novel was adapted into a stage play by Turku City Theatre.
