= Cold (film) =

2023 Icelandic film

- Film poster
- Icelandic: Kuldi
- Directed by: Erlingur Thoroddsen
- Screenplay by: Erlingur Thoroddsen
- Based on: Kuldi by Yrsa Sigurðardóttir
- Produced by: Johannes Haukur Johanneson; Elín Hall; Selma Björnsdóttir; Halldóra Geirharðsdóttir
- Starring: Heather Millard; Sigurjón Sighvatsson
- Cinematography: Brecht Goyvaerts
- Edited by: Linda Jildmalm
- Music by: Einar Tryggvason
- Release date: 1 September 2023
- Running time: 100 minutes
- Countries: Iceland, Belgium
- Language: Icelandic

Cold (Icelandic: Kuldi) is a 2023 Icelandic psychological thriller-horror film directed by Erlingur Thoroddsen.
