= Alexandra Salmela =

Slovak author

Alexandra Salmela (née Balážová; born 7 November 1980 in Bratislava) is a Slovak author, best known for her Finnish novel 27 eli kuolema tekee taiteilijan (2010), for which she won a Helsingin Sanomat Literature Prize, and was nominated for a Finlandia Prize. In 2013, Salmela published the storybook Giraffe Mum and Other Silly Adults. The book was also published simultaneously in Slovakia. It was nominated for the Arvid Lydecken Prize. Salmela's second novel, The Antihero, was published in September 2015.
