= Daniel Katz (environmental activist) =

American environmentalist

Daniel R. Katz
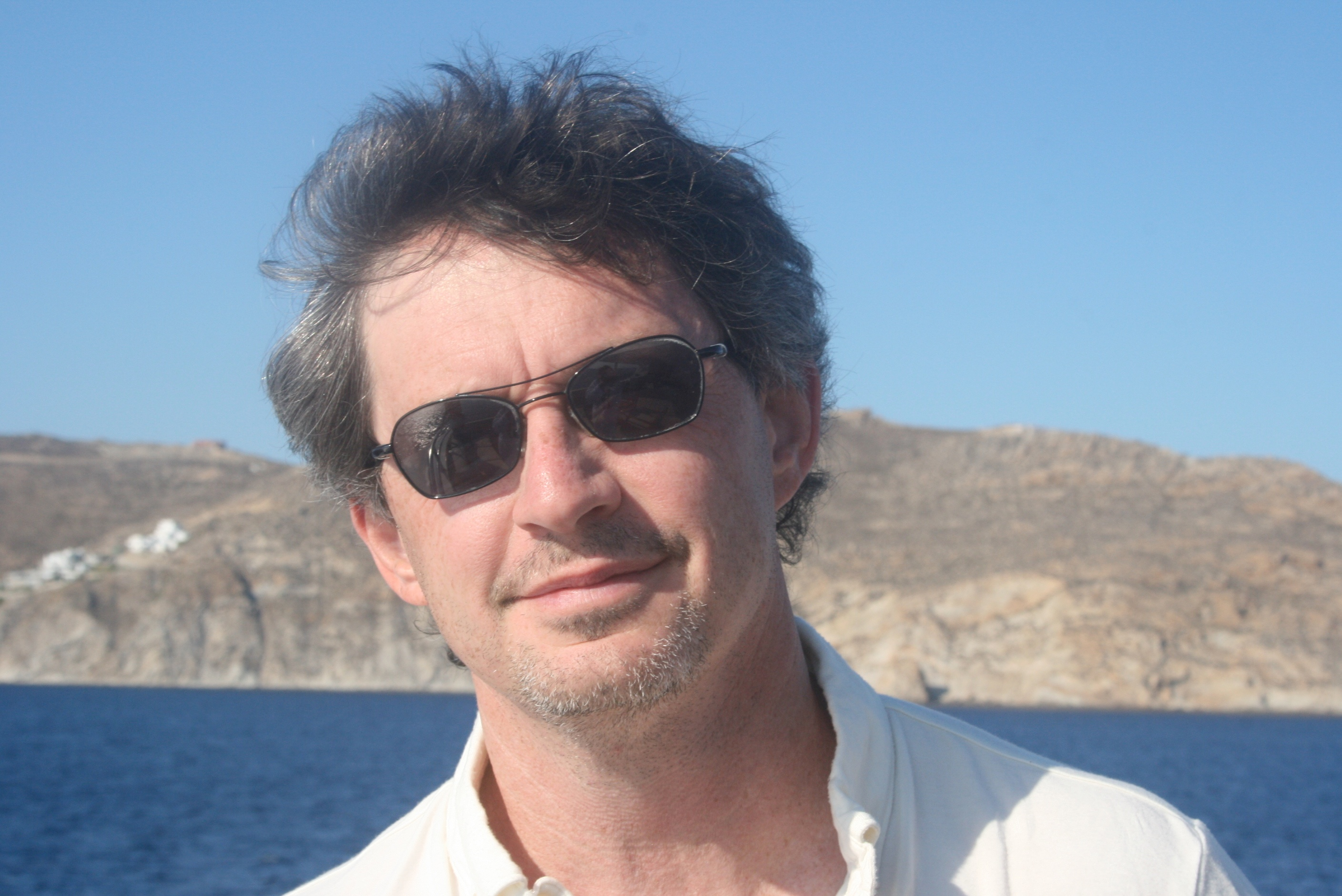
- Born: 1961 (age 64–65)
- Education: Ohio State University (B.A.); New York University Stern School of Business (M.B.A.)
- Occupations: Environmentalist, writer, speaker, activist
- Known for: Founding the Rainforest Alliance in 1986
- Children: 2

Daniel R. Katz (born 1961) is an American environmentalist writer, speaker and activist. He is currently the Senior Program Director at the Overbrook Foundation, where he leads environmental giving in the areas of biodiversity conservation, sustainability, and climate change.

== Education and career ==
Katz was raised in Cincinnati, Ohio. He earned his M.B.A. at New York University Stern School of Business and a B.A. from Ohio State University. After graduating from Ohio State, Katz moved to China intending to become a foreign correspondent, but instead learned about the destruction of rainforests, leading him to set up the Rainforest Alliance the following year.

=== Rainforest Alliance ===
Katz co-founded the Rainforest Alliance in 1986 at the age of 24, an organization instrumental in initiating the rainforest conservation movement. The Rainforest Alliance is a non-governmental organization that focuses on environmental conservation throughout the world. Under Katz's leadership, the Rainforest Alliance became the first nonprofit organization to create a global program to monitor, evaluate, certify and audit forests. The Rainforest Alliance is known world-wide for creating independent third-party certification in forestry, agriculture and tourism. He was the executive director of the Rainforest Alliance from its inception until 2000; today he serves as the Chairman of the Rainforest Alliance board.

=== Mail-order catalogs ===
He has campaigned against the wastefulness of mail-order catalogs, of which the average household receives about 114 a year. As a result of his role in starting up the Internet conservation website CatalogChoice.org, Katz has been described by PBS's Bill Moyers as the "Dr. Phil of catalog clutter" and "the maven of the overstuffed mailbox". Catalog Choice was sold to TrustedID in May 2012, and the proceeds will be distributed through a new foundation.

== Other work and personal life ==
A former Kellogg Foundation National Leadership Fellow, Katz serves or has served on the boards of several organizations including Grist, People for the American Way, Green Sports Alliance, and others.

He is the editor of two books: Why Freedom Matters: The Spirit of the Declaration of Independence in Prose, Poetry and Song (2003, Workman) and Tales from the Jungle: A Rainforest Reader (1995, Crown). Katz resides in New York City with his wife and two children.

He was honored with the Ohio State University Department of Humanities Alumni Award of Distinction.
