= Rainforest Alliance =

International sustainable agriculture organization

- Formation: 1987; 39 years ago
- Founder: Daniel Katz
- Type: NGO
- Headquarters: New York City, New York, United States
- Chairman: Daniel Katz
- CEO: Santiago Gowland
- Revenue: US$88,051,081 (2022)
- Expenses: US$93,151,598 (2022)
- Staff: 701 (2022)
- Website: www.rainforest-alliance.org

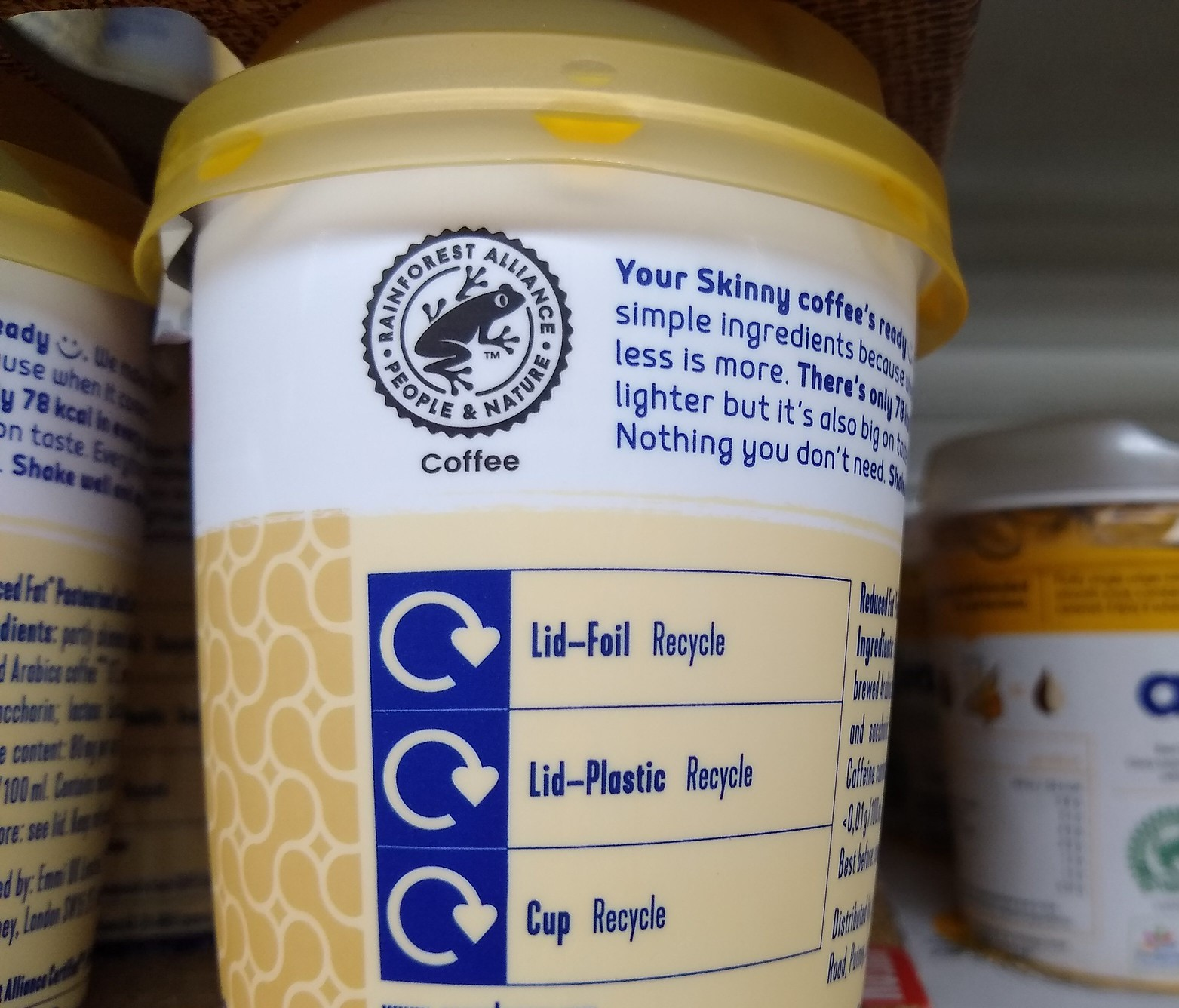
The Rainforest Alliance certification seal on a cup of coffee

The Rainforest Alliance is an international non-governmental organization (NGO) with staff in more than 20 countries and operations in more than 70 countries. It was founded in 1987 by Daniel Katz, an American environmental activist, who serves as the chair of the board of directors. The NGO states that its mission is "to create a more sustainable world by using social and market forces to protect nature and improve the lives of farmers and forest communities." Its work includes the provision of an environmental certification for sustainability in agriculture. In parallel to its certification program, the Rainforest Alliance develops and implements long-term conservation and community development programs in a number of critically important tropical landscapes where commodity production threatens ecosystem health and the well-being of rural communities.

== Merger with UTZ ==
In June 2017, the Rainforest Alliance and UTZ announced their intention to merge, and in January 2018, the merger was legally completed.

The Rainforest Alliance's work continues in Latin America, Africa, and Asia.

The Rainforest Alliance released a new certification standard in 2020, building upon the previous Rainforest Alliance Sustainable Agriculture Standard and the UTZ Certification Standard. The two previous certification programs operated in parallel with farms as either Rainforest Alliance or UTZ certified until they transitioned to the new 2020 standard.

== Rainforest Alliance programs ==
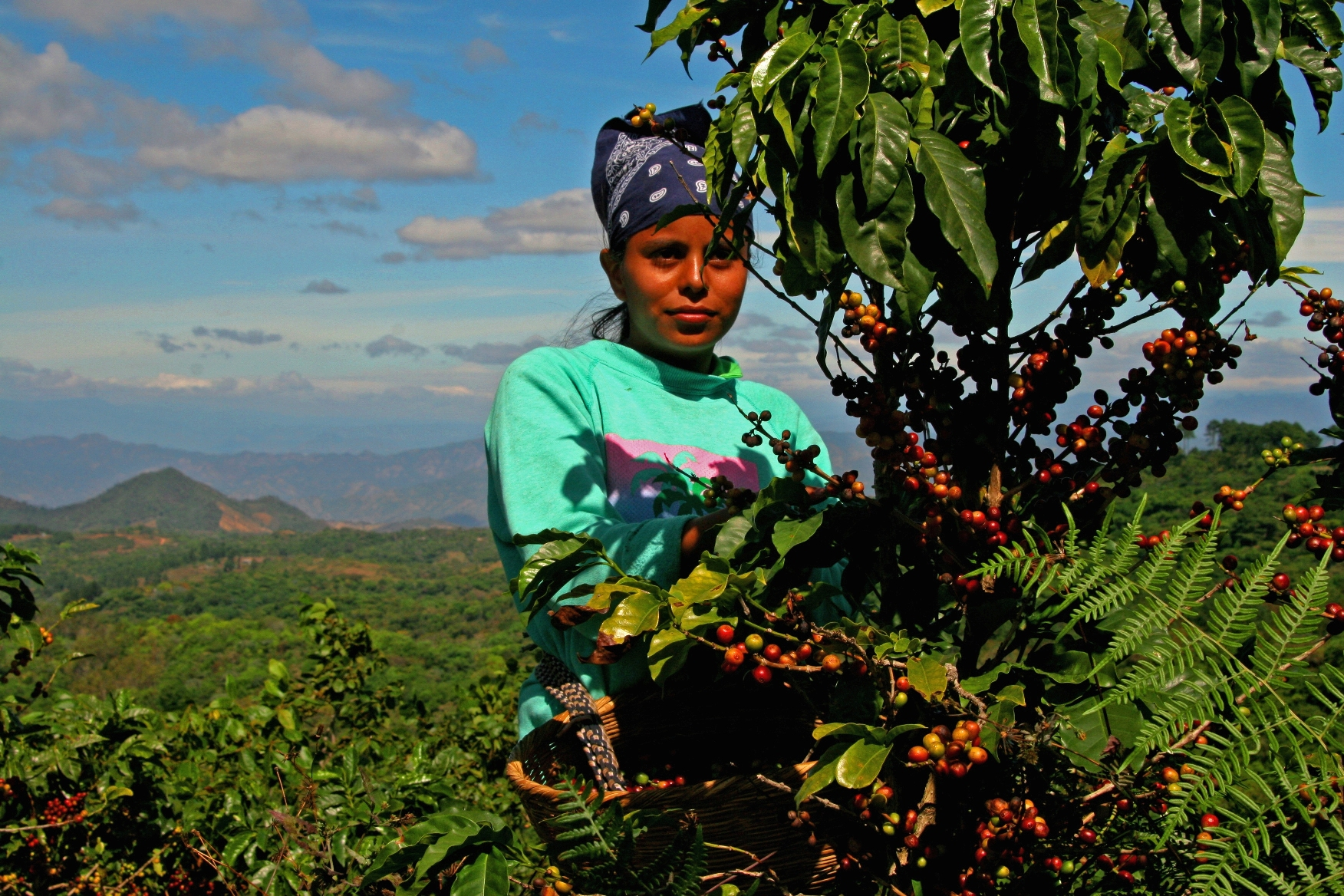
A woman picks coffee on the slopes of the Rainforest Alliance Certified cooperative Ciudad Barrios in El Salvador.

=== Sustainable forestry certification ===
As of October 1, 2018, the Rainforest Alliance transitioned its sustainable forestry certification business, including all related services, personnel and clients, to Preferred by Nature (formerly NEPCon), a global non-profit organization in Copenhagen, Denmark. Preferred by Nature has been a member of the Forest Stewardship Council (FSC) since 1996.

=== Sustainable agriculture certification ===
The Rainforest Alliance's sustainable agriculture program includes training programs for farmers and the certification of small, medium and large farms that produce more than 100 different crops, including coffee, tea, cocoa, and bananas. The Rainforest Alliance is phasing out cattle certification because it is not in the scope of the 2020 Certification Program. In recent years, the Rainforest Alliance has greatly expanded its work with smallholders, which includes more than 7.5 million farmers and workers certified by the organization. To obtain certification, farms must meet the Sustainable Agriculture Standard, which is designed to conserve ecosystems, protect biodiversity and waterways, conserve forests, reduce agrochemical use, improve livelihoods, and safeguard the rights and well-being of workers and local communities. The Rainforest Alliance encourages businesses and consumers to support sustainable agriculture by sourcing or choosing products grown on certified farms. More than 5.7 million hectares of farmland are being managed sustainably under Rainforest Alliance certification, as of 2023.

==== Crop standards and criteria ====
The Rainforest Alliance 2017 Sustainable Agriculture Standard was based on a gradual improvement system where more requirements had to be met each year. For a farm to get certified initially, it was required to achieve 100 percent of the critical criteria and 50 percent of the continuous improvement criteria within each group of criteria. The Farm Requirements of the new 2020 Sustainable Agriculture Standard include core requirements and improvement requirements. Core requirements outline key sustainable agriculture practices that must be met to achieve certification and are measured according to a pass/fail model. They include an ecosystem conservation program; protection of wild animals and waterways; the use of protective gear for workers; guidelines about agrochemical use; the prohibition of transgenic crops and implementation of an "assess-and-address" system to monitor and mitigate risks of child labor, forced labor, discrimination and workplace violence and harassment. Improvement requirements are designed to further promote and measure progress toward sustainable practices. They are categorized as either mandatory or self-selected. Some improvement requirements are pass/fail, while others are measured with Smart Meters.

Smart Meters give farmers a way to set goals for their farms based on what is most beneficial and feasible within their specific context. Rather than having predefined targets set by the Rainforest Alliance, farmers will set their own targets for improvements and define the necessary actions needed to achieve them. For example, while all farms must appoint a person or committee to address gender equality and carry out a basic risk assessment, they can each set their own annual targets to tackle more specific gender gaps related to their context.

==== Rainforest Alliance Certified Seal ====
The Rainforest Alliance Certified seal appears only on products that meet the crop standards and criteria detailed above. In February 2008, Ethical Corporation called Rainforest Alliance certification a "rigorous, independently verified scheme". As of 2019, more than 5,000 companies buy or sell products from Rainforest Alliance Certified farms, and the Rainforest Alliance Certified seal can be seen in more than 170 countries. As of June 2015, 13.6 percent of the world's cocoa and 15.1 percent of tea comes from Rainforest Alliance Certified farms. As of 2017, 5.7 percent of the world's coffee comes from Rainforest Alliance Certified farms.

=== Sustainable tourism ===
The Rainforest Alliance was a pioneer in third-party sustainable tourism recognition, working with hotels, inbound and outbound tour operators, and other tourism businesses to help them improve their environmental, social, and economic practices. As of October 1, 2018, Preferred by Nature assumed management of the Rainforest Alliance Sustainable Tourism Standards for Hotel and Lodging Services and Inbound Tour Operators. Currently, tourism businesses may use the Rainforest Alliance's green frog seal when they achieve certification according to Preferred by Nature's Sustainable Tourism Standard, recognized by the Global Sustainable Tourism Council.

== Rainforest Alliance 2020 Certification Program ==
Rainforest Alliance certification has been extended in recent years to products such as pineapples, hazelnuts, coconut oil, orange juice, and vegetables, among others. The presence of the seal in these products has become an added value in the commercial arena. Especially for retail groups, the seal represents a differential that distinguishes and certifies that the crop in question has been produced in a sustainable way, meeting specific requirements. Voluntary certification programs such as this one aim to reward producers who make the effort to implement better agricultural practices so as to obtain the certification. However, in practice, the producers are not always rewarded for their efforts.

To obtain Rainforest Alliance certification, compliance with specific environmental, social, and economic criteria is required and farms seeking certification regularly undergo compliance auditing. The certification program was updated and renamed the Sustainable Agriculture Standard in June 2020 with new sustainability requirements which enhanced environmental, social, and economic criteria. The new standard consists of two main components: farm requirements and supply chain requirements.

The Sustainable Agriculture Standard features innovation in the following areas: climate-smart agriculture, deforestation, conserving biodiversity, assessments, shared responsibility, human rights, living wage, continuous improvement, living income, risk-based assurance and gender equality. Rainforest Alliance is a code compliant member of ISEAL, and the Sustainable Agriculture Standard is independently evaluated against ISEAL's standard setting Code of Good Practice.

== Landscape management ==
The Rainforest Alliance partners with local communities to co-design and implement sustainable conservation and community development programs in tropical areas where commodity production threatens rural communities and the ecosystem. The Rainforest Alliance's integrated landscape management programs allow producers, companies, communities, local governments, and non-governmental organizations to discuss common interests and collective actions.

== Regenerative agriculture ==
In its 2024 annual report, the Rainforest Alliance introduced regenerative agriculture certification tools aimed at improving soil health, biodiversity, and rural livelihoods. The report outlined goals to support more integrated, landscape-level approaches and streamline standards across stakeholders. As part of its long-term objectives, the Rainforest Alliance plans to assist 100 million farmers in adopting regenerative practices by 2030.

== Criticism and response ==
=== Minimum price issues ===
Rainforest Alliance sustainable agriculture certification, like the certification schemes UTZ Certified and organic, does not offer producers minimum or guaranteed price, leaving them vulnerable to market price variations. For example, in the 1980s, a pound (454g) of standard-grade coffee sold for around US $1.20; in 2003, however, a pound sold for about $0.50, which was not enough to cover the costs of production in much of the world. The price of coffee has since been rebounding, with prices for arabica reaching $1.18/pound by the end of 2007.

Although many Rainforest Alliance Certified farms achieve price premiums for high-quality produce, the Alliance focuses on improving the entire spectrum of farming practices. Third-party studies have shown the organization's approach to be effective in raising both income and net revenue for farmers.

Michigan State University professor of sociology Daniel Jaffee has criticized Rainforest Alliance certification, claiming that its standards are "arguably far lower than fair trade's" [sic] noting that "they establish minimum housing and sanitary conditions but do not stipulate a minimum price for coffee. Critically, they require plantation owners only to pay laborers the national minimum wage, a notoriously inadequate standard."

The Economist favors the Rainforest Alliance's method and writes that "guaranteeing a minimum price [as Fairtrade does] means there is no incentive to improve quality". They also write that coffee drinkers say "the quality of Fairtrade brews varies widely. The Rainforest Alliance does things differently. It does not guarantee a minimum price or offer a premium but provides training advice. That consumers are often willing to pay more for a product with the [Rainforest Alliance] logo on it is an added bonus, not the result of a formal subsidy scheme; such products must still fend for themselves in the marketplace."

The Rainforest Alliance 2020 Certification Program promotes a shared responsibility approach that includes two new requirements for buyers of Rainforest Alliance Certified commodities: the Sustainability Differential and Sustainability Investments. The Sustainability Differential is an "additional cash payment made to certified producers over and above the market price of the commodity". This payment is completely free of restrictions or requirements on how it is used. The Sustainability Investments are "cash or in-kind investments from buyers of Rainforest Alliance Certified products to certified producers for the specific purpose of helping them meet the Sustainable Agriculture Standard".

To address the structural inequalities in the cocoa sector, persistently low incomes, and the challenges farmers face in negotiating prices, the Rainforest Alliance will introduce a minimum Sustainability Differential at $70 per metric ton for its cocoa program, as of July 2022.

=== Use of seal ===
In the mid 2000s the organization certification was criticized for allowing the use of its seal on products containing only a minimum of 30 percent certified content. However, the current standard requires 90 percent certified content, or 100 percent equivalent certified volume via a certified mass balance supply chain. The exception to that rule is herbs, where the minimum threshold was 40 percent up until the end of 2021 and 50 percent thereafter, and palm oil, where the minimum threshold is 30 percent. In any case, products containing herbs and palm oil that meet the minimum threshold but do not meet the 90 percent threshold are required to indicate the amount of certified content on the label.

=== Lawsuit filed against Rainforest Alliance ===
In 2014, the U.S. nonprofit Water and Sanitation Health (WASH) filed a civil lawsuit against Rainforest Alliance in alleging unfair marketing practices because the Rainforest Alliance certified Chiquita banana suppliers as sustainable when they were "contaminating drinking water with fertilizers and fungicides and have air-dropped pesticides perilously close to schools and homes" in Guatemala. The Rainforest Alliance denied WASH's allegations, standing by its auditing practices. The lawsuit was dismissed by the United States District Court for the Western District of Washington on August 5th, 2016.

A similar case against the Rainforest Alliance by Corporate Accountability Lab (CAL) was dismissed by the Washington, D.C. Superior Court in 2023.

=== Costa Rican pineapples ===
A report in 2020 by The Guardian alleged that some Costa Rica pineapple growers certified by the scheme were exploiting their labour force, using illegal agrochemicals, and concealing hundreds of undocumented workers from auditors. The Rainforest Alliance said all its certified plantations were required to comply with strict audits and inspections; but the report quoted the president of Fecon, a Costa Rican environmental group, as saying that audits were insufficiently rigorous to reveal violations.

=== Latin American banana growers ===
The development and publication of the 2020 Sustainable Agriculture Standard caused concern among several Latin American banana producer and exporter associations. The associations, which partner with the Rainforest Alliance and share its ambitions and sustainable objectives, challenged the new standards and the Rainforest Alliance's decision-making process in an open letter to the organization on July 17, 2020. In the letter, banana associations from Ecuador, Costa Rica, Colombia and Guatemala requested that the Rainforest Alliance explain the process of socialization to the new standard and expressed their concerns, considering that only 2 percent of their demands had been taken into account.

On July 23, 2020, the Rainforest Alliance responded by holding a meeting with several of the banana associations to exchange perspectives on the new standard. As Juan José Pons, coordinator of Ecuador's banana cluster, stated: the standard "does not take into account the immense effort and related costs that we have made in the recent years, both in social and environmental matters. Our investment is not reflected in the final price, it has had no return, quite the contrary, European supermarkets always impose lower and lower prices." During the meeting, the banana associations questioned why the new standard does not address the region's economic challenges, which have been exacerbated in part by the COVID-19 pandemic and black sigatoka disease. In an El Universo article, José Antonio Hidalgo, executive director of the Association of Banana Exporters of Ecuador, stated that the banana associations needed "to reach an agreement with [the Rainforest Alliance] or we will have to look for alternatives".

For these producers and exporters, obtaining Rainforest Alliance certification is essential to keep the doors to the European Union market open, where more than 65 percent of their banana exports are directed. In response to the banana associations' ongoing concerns, the Rainforest Alliance organized a series of roundtables through December 2020 to discuss the new standard with representatives from the banana sector. However, as of November 2020, banana associations continued to disagree with the new standard's shared responsibility plan, which would place the new standard's increased production cost solely on banana producers. In this context, the banana associations continued conversations with the Rainforest Alliance and European Union retailers to resolve the issue. On November 27, 2020, the banana associations called a tripartite roundtable with the Rainforest Alliance and European Union retailers to discuss the new standard and the future development of guidelines for shared responsibility. The Rainforest Alliance was not present at the meeting and banana producers subsequently requested a meeting with the organization's board of directors.

The Rainforest Alliance responded by organizing another roundtable on December 18, 2020, to further discuss the new standard with banana sector representatives. Although the Rainforest Alliance affirmed it took into account the comments of all stakeholders involved in the consultation process, especially those of banana growers, banana association representatives again expressed their dissatisfaction with the outcome. In particular, they considered that the way in which the meeting had been organized and managed did not allow for a constructive dialogue to take place. Furthermore, according to the banana associations, the explanations provided by the Rainforest Alliance did not clarify the strategy by which the new standard would be applied, which still failed to fill several gaps around the implementation of the concept of shared responsibility. The Rainforest Alliance's new shared responsibility approach and 2020 Sustainable Agriculture Standard were set to be fully implemented by mid-2021.

== See also ==
- Climate, Community & Biodiversity Alliance
- Fair trade
- Sustainable coffee
- Multistakeholder governance
