= Jouni Inkala =

Finnish poet (born 1966)

- Born: 15 April 1966 (age 60); Kemi, Finland

Jouni Mikael Inkala was born on 15 April 1966, in Kemi, Finland. Until the year 2005 he had published seven collections of poems of which the latest were Kirjoittamaton (Unwritten, 2002) and Sarveisaikoja (Periods of stratum cornea, 2005). Jouni Inkala encounters Anton Chekhov, Joseph Brodsky and Ludwig Wittgenstein, among others, in his collection of poetry Kirjoittamaton which approaches its semi-fictional subjects with sharp twists and sarcastic asides.

Jouni Inkala's first work Tässä sen reuna (The Edge of It) received the J. H. Erkko Award in 1992. After Inkala's first poem collection the poet has changed two or three times his attitudes strongly, and Inkala's readers have been able to see this in his "poetic grammar". He has also strongly made an approach to Christian mysticism and nature mediation. Inkala uses bright imagery without technical isolation. Syntactic elasticity in combining with deep thinking and concrete expression makes his poetry well balanced.

The titles of the collections, Huonetta ja sukua (Room and family, 1994) and Pyhien seura (The Company of Saints, 1996), refer to the Bible and to a religious tradition, but employ largely the same material as in his depot. In particular, the former of the two collections is characterised by long, open and closed sentences, the language defies meaning and makes itself the subject. In the collection Sille joka jää (For the one who remains, 1998) Biblical events and religious themes in fact form a framework to which the poems can refer. The voice in these poems is nonetheless the same as before. There are few dramatic external events, rather internal and external visions succeed in stopping time and in doing so allow language and thoughts to assume their own paths.

In the volume Autiomaaretki (Journey through the desert, 2000), transitions are more rapid than before. Leaving behind the world's superfluous verbosity has clearly brought a perceptive freedom to the poems. The poems, which take place in an instrument shop, the Viking Museum, on a winter's evening or in Finnmark in Norway, seem to have returned both to the mood of his debut and stylistically to traditional Finnish modernism. Much literature discusses the idea of "otherness", yet in his poems Inkala proves that human beings are always part of a greater, intentional order, for which we should rejoice and give thanks.

Inkala is able to prove semantic exactness and sense of relations. His poems have been translated into dozens of languages and published in different anthologies and literary journals. Inkala has published in 1995 a translation collection Aus dem Hause und dem Geschlechte (translated from Finnish into German by Stefan Moster). Inkala has studied philosophy, intellectual history and comparative literature at the universities of Oulu and Helsinki (University of Helsinki: Licentiate in Philosophy, 1991). He has worked as a columnist in various periodicals and as a lecturer in the department of comparative literature at the University of Helsinki in 1991–1994. Inkala left his university career for poetry.

== Jouni Inkala's collections of poems in Finnish ==
- Tässä sen reuna (WSOY, 1992)
- Huonetta ja sukua (WSOY, 1994)
- Pyhien seura (WSOY, 1996)
- Sille joka jää (WSOY, 1998)
- Autiomaaretki (WSOY, 2000)
- Kirjoittamaton (WSOY, 2002)
- Sarveisaikoja (WSOY, 2005)
- Minkä tietäminen on ihmiselle välttämätöntä (WSOY, 2008)
- Kemosynteesi (Siltala, 2011)
- Kesto avoin (Siltala, 2013)
- Vakiot ja muuttujat (Siltala, 2015)
- Nähty. Elämä (Siltala, 2017)
- Tee kunniaa, tee kunniaa! (Siltala, 2019)
- Jumalalle pyhitetty susi (Siltala, 2021)
- Geenihymni (Siltala, 2023)

== See also ==
- Athena-Artemis
