= Daniel Katz (writer) =

Finnish writer

Daniel Katz (born 1938 in Helsinki) is a Finnish writer.

He is a graduate of the University of Helsinki in the Humanities. He worked as a Jewish history teacher at the Jewish School in Helsinki, and in Haifa Israel as a driller on subway construction.

He writes in Finnish. His first commercially successful novel, Kun isoisä Suomeen hiihti (When Grandfather Skied to Finland), is a humorous description of Katz's family history and Finland's entry into World War II. As an ethnic minority writer, Katz has written as an outsider regarding life in Finland. He has been awarded and been a finalist for the J. H. Erkko Award (debut novel), Runeberg Prize and others.

Katz has four children, including Dunja Katz and the musician Kalle Katz. He lives in Loviisa, Finland.

== Works ==
Novels

- Kun isoisä Suomeen hiihti, (When Grandfather Skied to Finland) WSOY 1969
- Mikko Papirossin taivaallinen niskalenkki, WSOY 1972
- Orvar Kleinin kuolema, WSOY 1976
- Laturi, (The Blaster) WSOY 1979
- Peltisepän päivällinen, WSOY 1981
- Satavuotias muna, novelleja, WSOY 1983
- Antti Keplerin lait, WSOY 1987
- Naisen torso, novelleja, WSOY 1989
- Saksalainen sikakoira, (German Pig-Dog) WSOY 1992
- Otelo, novelleja, WSOY 1994
- Herra Lootin tyttäret, WSOY 1999
- Laituri matkalla mereen, (A Pier on the Way) WSOY 2001
- Berberileijonan rakkaus (Berber Lion) WSOY 2008

Radio Plays

- Sankarikornetti, 1968
- Perimmäisten ominaisuuksien äärellä eli Konrad Monomaani, 1971
- Vappu, 1973

Screen plays

- Miten kalat suutelevat, 1970
- Silleri karkuteillä, 1973
- Orvar Kleinin laillinen ruumis (TV), 1975
- Iso viulu – kaks' sataa (TV), 1976
- sepeli metsä 1980
- Kolmipäinen buddha eli valtapeli, 1978
- Narrit (yhdessä Pekka Milonoffin kanssa), 1977
- Jussi laidastalaitaan ja Pedro Papumaha, 1983
- Säätieteilijä, 1983
