= Erlingur Thoroddsen =

Icelandic film director and screenwriter

Erlingur Óttar Thoroddsen
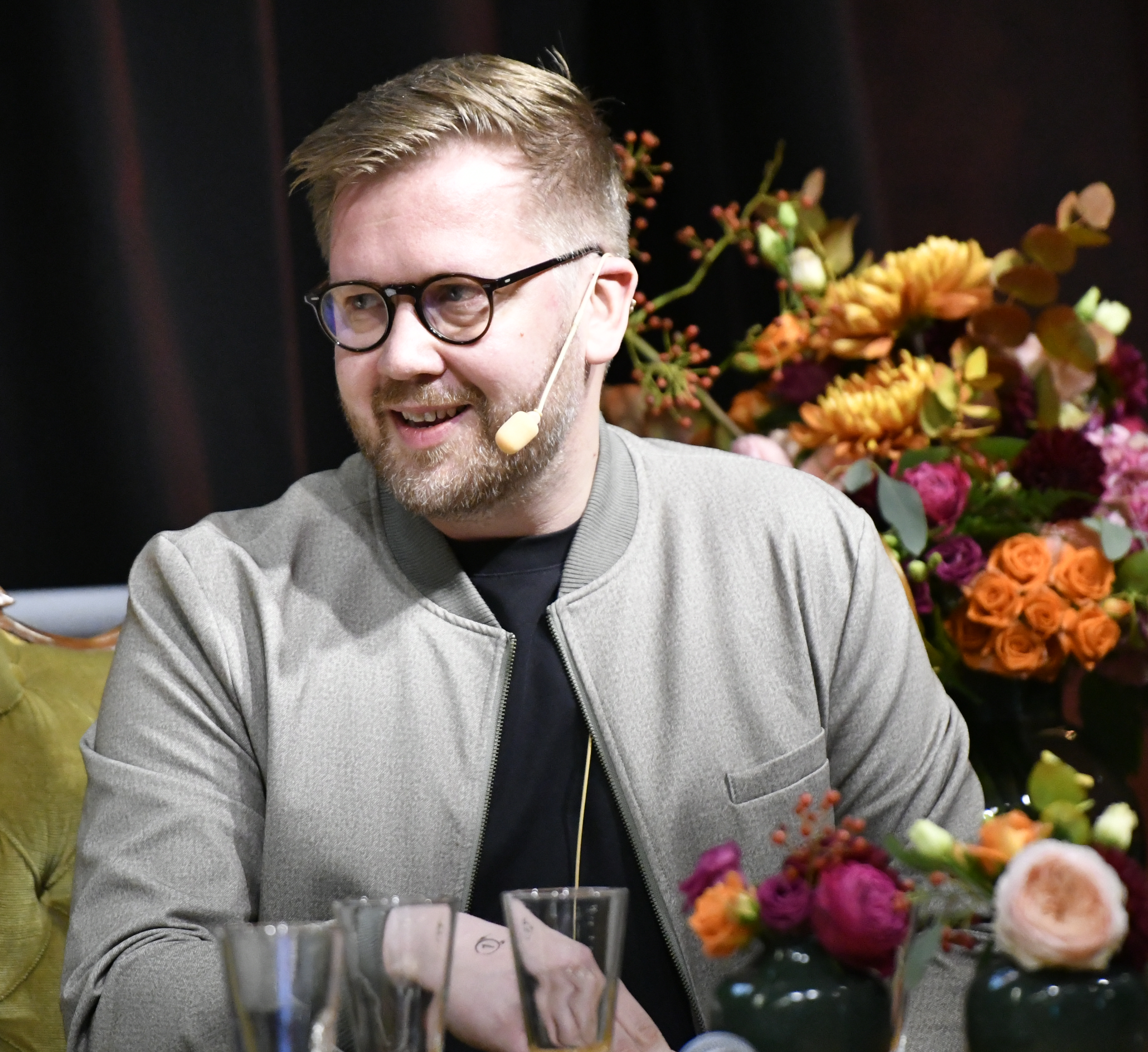
- Erlingur Óttar Thoroddsen at the Göteborg Book Fair in 2024.
- Born: 27 April 1984 (age 42)
- Occupations: film director; screenwriter

Erlingur Óttar Thoroddsen (born 27 April 1984) is an Icelandic film director and screenwriter. Erlingur graduated from Columbia University's MFA Film Directing Program in 2013.

In 2017, Erlingur directed his second feature film, Rift (Icelandic: Rökkur), a gay Icelandic psychological thriller. Erlingur won the Award for Artistic Achievement for Rift at Outfest in 2017.

In 2023, Erlingur directed The Piper, a dark reimagining of the tale of the Pied Piper of Hamelin.

== Filmography ==
- Child Eater (2016)
- Rift (Icelandic: Rökkur) (2017)
- Cold (Icelandic: Kuldi) (2023)
- The Piper (2023)
