= Piper High School =

Piper High School may refer to:

- Piper High School (Florida) — Sunrise, Florida
- Piper High School (Kansas) — Kansas City, Kansas
