= Helsingin Sanomat Literature Prize =

Helsingin Sanomat Literature Prize (Finnish: Helsingin Sanomien kirjallisuuspalkinto) is a Finnish literary award for a debut novel in the Finnish language. It was founded in 1964. From 1964–1994 it operated under the name J. H. Erkko Award (Finnish: J. H. Erkon palkinto). Beginning in 1995 the name changed to Helsingin Sanomat Literature Prize. The prize is valued at €15,000.

== Helsingin Sanomat Literature Prize ==
- 1995 Sari Mikkonen: Naistenpyörä, ISBN 951-0-20434-X
- 1996 Juha K. Tapio: Frankensteinin muistikirja, ISBN 951-26-4164-X
- 1997 Marja Kyllönen: Lyijyuuma, ISBN 951-0-22048-5
- 1998 Katri Tapola: Kalpeat tytöt, ISBN 951-31-1329-9
- 1999 Jyrki Vainonen: Tutkimusmatkailija ja muita tarinoita, ISBN 952-9646-82-8
- 2000 Olli Heikkonen: Jakutian aurinko, ISBN 951-31-1785-5
- 2001 Reidar Palmgren: Jalat edellä, ISBN 952-459-141-3
- 2002 Reko Lundán: Ilman suuria suruja, ISBN 952-459-387-4
- 2003 Riku Korhonen: Kahden ja yhden yön tarinoita, ISBN 952-5194-64-7
- 2004 Sanna Karlström: Taivaan mittakaava, ISBN 951-1-19355-4
- 2005 Juhani Känkänen: Toivon mukaan, ISBN 951-851-031-8
- 2006 Armas Alvari: Varmat tapaukset, ISBN 951-31-3720-1
- 2007 Henriikka Tavi: Esim. Esa, ISBN 978-951-851-110-9
- 2008 Katri Lipson: Kosmonautti, ISBN 978-951-31-4294-0
- 2009 Leena Parkkinen: Sinun jälkeesi, Max, ISBN 978-951-851-205-2
- 2010 Alexandra Salmela: 27 eli kuolema tekee taiteilijan, ISBN 978-951-851-302-8
- 2011 Satu Taskinen: Täydellinen paisti, ISBN 978-951-851-381-3
- 2012 Aki Ollikainen: Nälkävuosi, ISBN 978-952-234-089-4
- 2013 Erkka Filander: Heräämisen valkea myrsky
- 2014 Pajtim Statovci: Kissani Jugoslavia (My Cat Yugoslavia)
- 2015 Saara Turunen: Rakkaudenhirviö
- 2016 Hanna Weselius: Alma!
- 2017 Pauli Tapio: Varpuset ja aika
- 2018 Eeva Turunen: Neiti U muistelee niin sanottua ihmissuhdehistoriaansa
- 2019 Jouni Teittinen: Sydäntasku
- 2020 Terhi Kokkonen: Rajamaa
- 2021 Meri Valkama: Sinun, Margot
- 2022 Susanna Hast: Ruumis/huoneet
- 2023 Iida Turpeinen: Elolliset
- 2024 Paula Sankelo: Katoava jää
- 2025 Mariia Niskavaara: Ester, teurastaja

== J. H. Erkko Award ==
Year	Author(s)	Title
1964	Kari Aronpuro; Matti Paavilainen	Peltiset enkelit Sukukartta
1965	Matti Rossi; Pekka Suhonen	Näytelmän henkilöt Kootut runot
1966	Eira Stenberg; Reijo Lehtinen	Kapina huoneessa Sinun nimes kirjoihin
1967	Veikko Polameri	365
1968	Tytti Parras	Jojo
1969	Daniel Katz; Esko Raento	Kun isoisä Suomeen hiihti Kokkonen
1970	Hans Selo	Diiva
1971	Matti Summanen; Antti Tuuri	Haukka Lentää; Asioiden suhteet ja Lauantaina illalla
1972	Merja Huttunen; Kaiho Nieminen; Jukka Pakkanen	Hello love Lovistoori; Koko maailman meno
1973	Heikki Turunen	Simpauttaja
1974	Risto Antikainen; Raine Mäkinen	Hiljainen kylätie Kuuma syksy, romaani
1975	Pirkko Saisio	Elämänmeno
1976	Eeva Heilala; Asko Laurila	Hyvä on maa Aurinko ja omenapuu
1977	Matti Pulkkinen	Ja pesäpuu itki
1978	Hannu Helin; Olli Jalonen	Tärisen maailman kyljessä Unien tausta
1979	Ari Ahola	Rajan miehet
1980	Hannu Kankaanpää; Kari Levola; Kirsti Simonsuuri	Sukupolvi; Avovedet; Murattikaide
1981	Anja Kauranen	Sonja O. kävi täällä
1982	Matti Tiisala; Jouko Turkka	Se ei ollut ovi Aiheita, proosaa
1983	Joni Skiftesvik	Puhalluskukkapoika ja taivaankorjaaja
1984	Anna-Leena Härkönen	Häräntappoase
1985	Rosa Liksom; Boris Verho	Yhden yön pysäkki Varastossa aina palaa valo
1986	Juha Seppälä	Torni
1987	Sakari Issakainen	Paratiisissa ei soi Paganini
1988	Sylvia Juutinen; Päivi Perttula	Jatulintarha; Suhdetta
1989	Pirkko Lindberg	Byte (suom. Saalis)
1990	Marko Kari	Reviiri
1991	Marjatta Schier	Myrkkyliljat
1992	Jouni Inkala	Tässä sen reuna
1993	Tomi Kontio	Tanssisalitaivaan alla
1994	Markus Nummi	Kadonnut Pariisi
