= Karjalan Maa =

Finnish regional newspaper (1917–2011)

- Type: Regional newspaper
- Publisher: Maakunnan Kustannus Oy
- Editor-in-chief: Pekka Puustinen
- Founded: 1917
- Political alignment: Centrist
- Language: Finnish
- Ceased publication: 28 April 2011
- Headquarters: Joensuu
- Country: Finland

Karjalan Maa was a regional newspaper published in Joensuu, Finland, between 1918 and 28 April 2011. It was the organ and the last provincial paper of the Center Party.

== History and profile ==
Karjalan Maa was established in March 1917. Its first issue was published in 1918 with title Korpi-Jaakko. The paper had its headquarters in Joensuu. In the mid-1950s the paper came out six times per week. It was published by Maakunnan Kustannus Oy three times a week until April 2010 when it began to be published once a week.

Karjalan Maa was one of the newspapers owned by the Center Party. The other one is Suomenmaa. The editor of Karjalan Maa was Viljo Laitinen in 1972, and he published an article which criticized the Finnish President Urho Kekkonen for not adequately taking into account the situation of the poor in regard to the reforms in pensions. After the publication of the article Kekkonen sent a displeased letter to the newspaper.

As of 1957 the circulation of Karjalan Maa was 10,113 copies. Pekka Puustinen served as the editor-in-chief of the paper which ceased publication on 28 April 2011.
