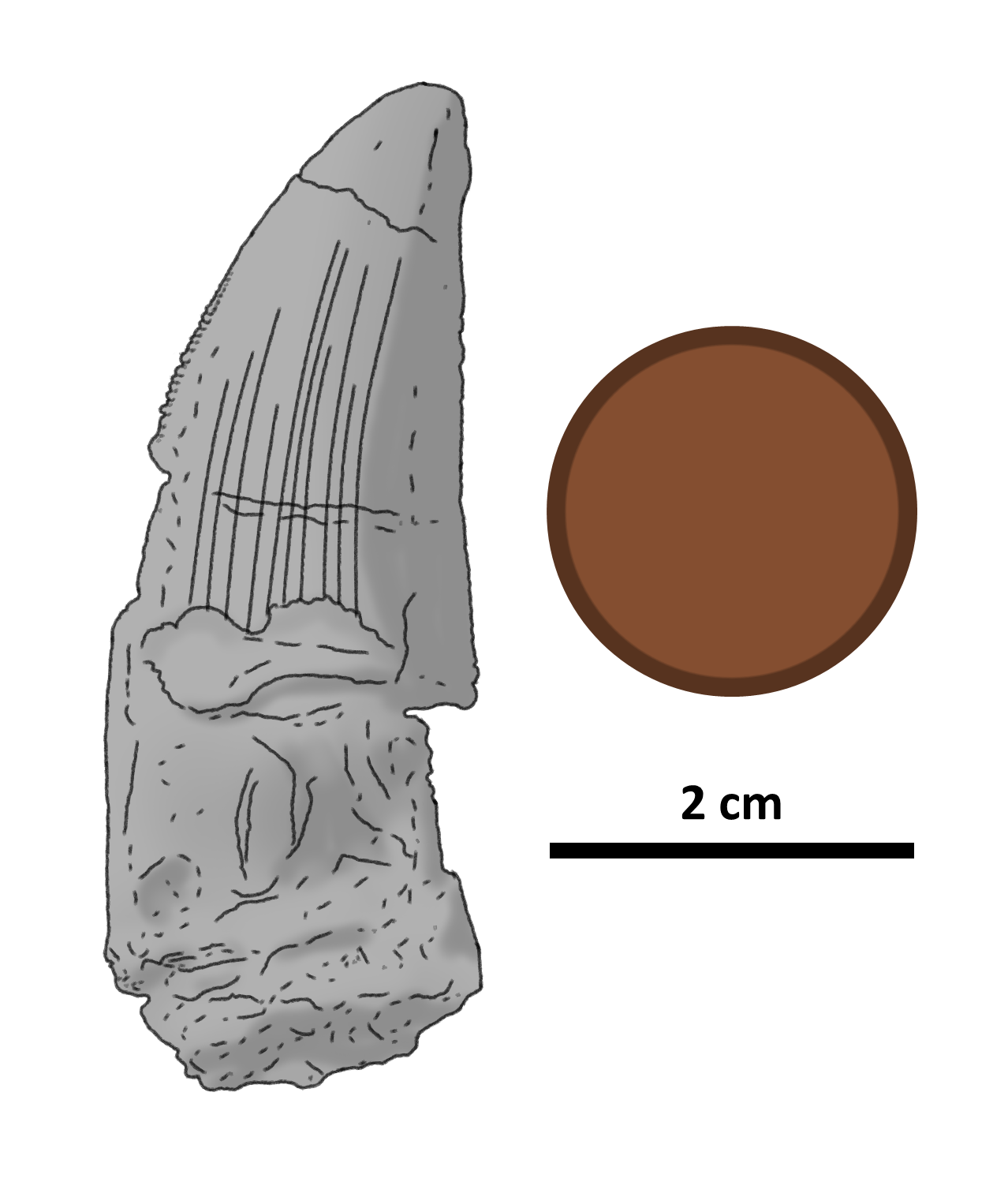
- Illustrated holotype tooth, with British penny for scale

Scientific classification
- Kingdom: Animalia
- Phylum: Chordata
- Class: Reptilia
- Clade: Dinosauria
- Clade: Saurischia
- Clade: Theropoda
- Family: †Spinosauridae (?)
- Genus: †Ostafrikasaurus; Buffetaut, 2012
- Species: †O. crassiserratus

Binomial name
- †Ostafrikasaurus crassiserratus Buffetaut, 2012

= Ostafrikasaurus =

Ostafrikasaurus Temporal range: Late Jurassic, (Tithonian) 152.1–145 Ma

Potentially dubious genus of theropod dinosaur

Ostafrikasaurus is a potentially dubious genus of theropod dinosaur from the Late Jurassic period of what is now Lindi Region, Tanzania. It is known only from fossil teeth discovered sometime between 1909 and 1912, during an expedition to the Tendaguru Formation by the Natural History Museum of Berlin. Eight teeth were originally attributed to the dubious dinosaur genus Labrosaurus, and later to Ceratosaurus, both known from the North American Morrison Formation. Subsequent studies attributed two of these teeth to a spinosaurid dinosaur, and in 2012, Ostafrikasaurus crassiserratus was named by French palaeontologist Eric Buffetaut, with one tooth as the holotype, and the other referred to the same species. The generic name comes from the German word for German East Africa, the former name of the colony in which the fossils were found, while the specific name comes from the Latin words for "thick" and "serrated", in reference to the form of the animal's teeth.

The holotype tooth is 46 millimetres (1.8 inches) long, has a curved front edge, and is oval-shaped in cross section. The tooth shows serrations that—for spinosaur standards—are unusually large, more so than in any other known taxon. Both the front and back cutting edges are serrated, with two to four denticles per mm (0.04 in). The tooth also has longitudinal ridges on both sides, and the outermost enamel layer has a wrinkled texture in the regions between and without ridges.

== History of research ==
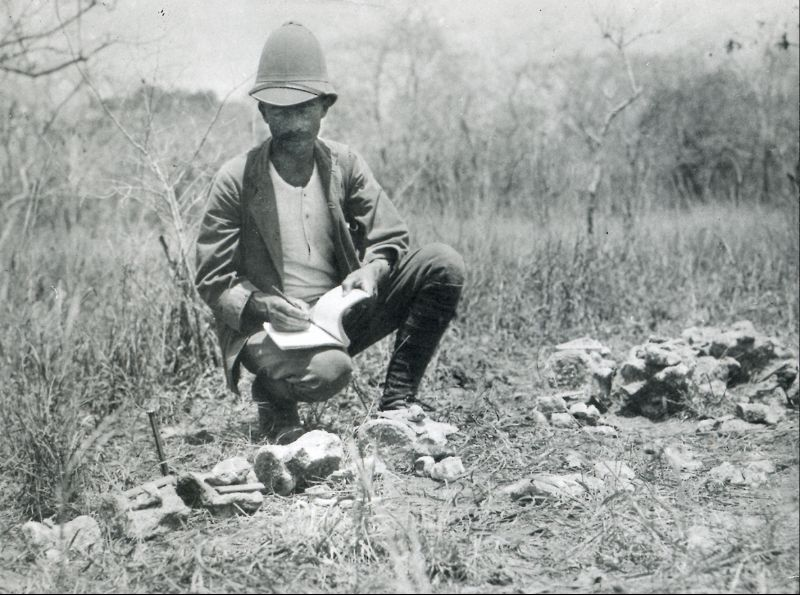
Werner Janensch during the Tendaguru expedition, 1910

During the time of the German colonial empire, the Museum für Naturkunde (Natural History Museum) of Berlin arranged an expedition in German East Africa (now Tanzania) that took place from 1909 to 1912, and is now regarded by scientists as one of the largest expeditions in palaeontological history. Most of the excavations were situated in the southeastern Tendaguru Formation, a fossil-rich site part of the Mandawa Basin dated to the Late Jurassic period. Among the many dinosaur fossils retrieved from the dig sites were 230 specimens of theropod teeth. One of these was an isolated tooth catalogued as MB R 1084, found either nearby or atop Tendaguru Hill at the Upper Dinosaur Member. It was originally attributed to the species Labrosaurus? stechowi in 1920 by German palaeontologist Werner Janensch, based on comparable ornamentation to a tooth described as Labrosaurus sulcatus by Othniel Charles Marsh. A detailed monograph by Janensch published in 1925 assigned MB R 1084, as well as eight teeth from the Middle Dinosaur Member to L.? stechowi and divided them into five morphotypes (from a to e).

In 2000, American palaeontologists James Madsen and Samuel Welles referred the L.? stechowi teeth to Ceratosaurus sp. (of uncertain species), because they resembled teeth from the premaxilla and dentary jaw bones of Ceratosaurus, a theropod from the North American Morrison Formation. In 2007, American palaeontologist Denver Fowler instead proposed that the teeth were those of a spinosaurid dinosaur similar to Baryonyx, which would make it among the oldest known spinosaurid fossils and thus some of the earliest evidence of the group. This analysis was maintained by French palaeontologist Eric Buffetaut, who examined the teeth that year, and in a 2008 paper referred specimen MB R 1084 to the Spinosauridae. Bufetaut found that this specimen differed from other teeth previously referred to L.? stechowi, and that another isolated tooth (MB R 1091) from the Middle Dinosaur Member might represent the same animal. He also questioned Janensch's provisional assignment of the teeth to the dubious genus Labrosaurus, which was based on scant remains from the Morrison Formation that were later attributed to Allosaurus. Furthermore, Buffetaut noted that the L. sulcatus tooth illustrated by Marsh is now regarded as belonging to Ceratosaurus. Similarly, L. stechowi is now considered a dubious ceratosaurian related to Ceratosaurus.

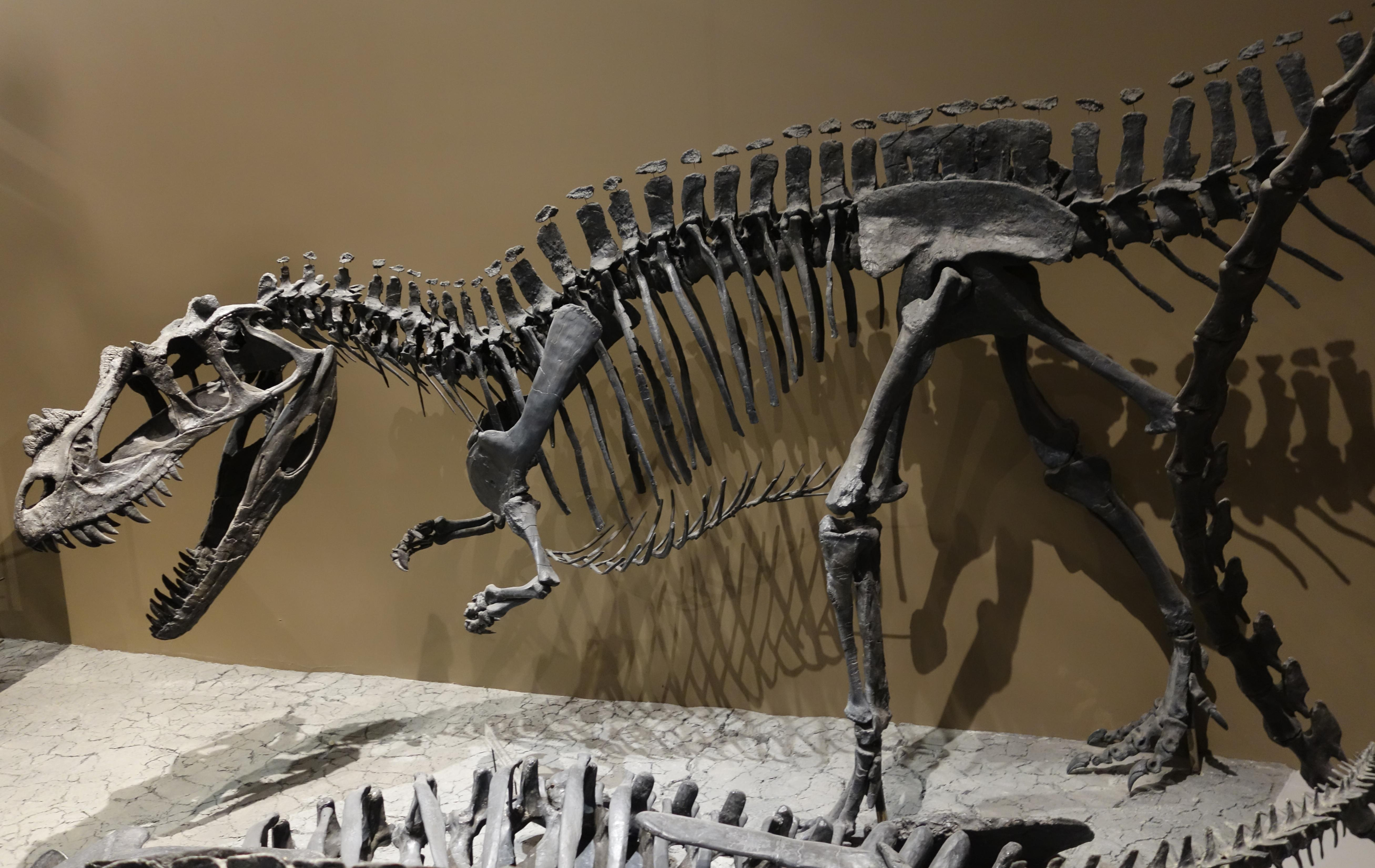
Most of the teeth originally attributed to the same taxon as Ostafrikasaurus teeth are now believed to have represented Ceratosaurus (pictured) or a similar animal

In 2011, German palaeontologist Oliver Rauhut considered the Middle Dinosaur Member teeth ascribed to L.? stechowi as lacking diagnostic characters (unique derived traits), concurring that the species is a dubious name. Rauhut noted that they can still be differentiated from other theropod teeth from the Tendaguru Formation, based on their slight recurvature and sideways flattening of the tooth crown, and broad ridges on the lingual flank (which faced the inside of the mouth). He recognized L. sulcatus as a dubious name, since the tooth referred to it was shown only in a single illustration and not properly described in text. In addition, the original remains of Labrosaurus did not include teeth, and an additional species, Labrosaurus ferox (now considered synonymous with Allosaurus fragillis), was based on a dentary bone bearing teeth of different morphology to those of L. sulcatus. Thus, Rauhut concluded there was no basis for attributing the Tendaguru teeth to Labrosaurus. He tentatively referred all of them except MB R 1084 to Ceratosaurus (under the name Ceratosaurus? stechowi), on the basis of anatomical similarities with teeth from that genus. According to Rauhut, the different features between Janensch's type b, c, e, and d teeth did not represent distinct taxa, but rather variation along the tooth row in the animal's jaws. Rauhut also attributed another tooth (MB R 1093) described by Janensch, yet not referred to L.? stechowi, to the same taxon.

Rauhut also found that Janensch's type a (MB R 1084) was distinct in form from the other eight teeth, and possibly represented a different taxon closely related to C.? stechowi. He listed some differences between it and the other teeth originally referred to L.? stechowi: MB R 1084 has more lingual ridges (up to eleven) and three ridges and grooves on the labial side, which faced the outside of the mouth. Moreover, some of MB R 1084's ridges are confined to the base of the crown, joined by longer ridges extending throughout almost the whole length of the crown, with a 5 mm (0.20 in) high region at the tip of the tooth lacking any ornamentation. Additionally, ridges are present over almost the entire front three-fifths of the crown, whereas the rear two-fifths are smooth. Towards the front of the tooth, the ridged part is separated from the carina (cutting edge) by an area that is slightly concave front to back. The only similarities between MB R 1084 and the Middle Dinosaur Member teeth lie in their general shape and density of their serrations, as all teeth have 10 denticles per 5 millimetres (0.20 in) on the rear carina and 13 denticles per 5 millimetres (0.20 in) on the front carina.

In a 2012 paper, Buffetaut used MB R 1084 as the holotype specimen for the new genus and species Ostafrikasaurus crassiserratus, describing it as an early spinosaurid theropod. Its generic name is derived from the German name of the colony in which the fossils were found, Deutsch-Ostafrika, meaning "German East Africa", combined with the Greek σαῦρος (sauros), meaning "lizard" or "reptile". The specific name comes from the Latin crassus, meaning "thick"; and serratus, meaning "serrated", in reference to the large serrations of its teeth. Due to similarities with MB R 1084, Buffetaut assigned MB R 1091 from the Middle Dinosaur Member to the same species. Both teeth have a curved front carina, no side to side curvature, and a comparable shape in cross section. Their main differences include MB R 1091 having five lengthwise ridges on its lingual side compared to MB R 1084's ten, the ridges on the former being less extensive. MB R 1091 also had less wrinkled tooth enamel. Buffetaut notes that these differences could be explained by individual variation within the taxon, but since both teeth originated from different members of the Tendaguru Formation, the referral is only tentative.

Buffetaut elaborated on the differences between the teeth of Ostafrikasaurus crassiserratus and Janensch's L.? stechowi morphotypes. Morphotype b (MB R 1083 and 1087) teeth had both front to back and side to side curvature, and a D-shaped cross section. Morphotype c (MB R 1090) was curved side to side but not front to back, was not flattened from side to side, had a rounded front with no carina, and bore five strong ridges on its lingual side, but none on its labial flank. Morphotype e (MB R 1092) resembled a typical theropod tooth. It is strongly flattened from side to side, curved from front to back, shows 3 denticles per millimetre (0.04 in), its front carina does not extend to the base of the crown, and there is no ornamentation aside from some weak furrowing of the crown, and two incipient ridges on the lingual side.

Another study published in the same year argued that the fragmentary tooth taxa Ostafrikasaurus and Siamosaurus should be regarded as nomina dubia, later in that same year, a study by Soto and colleagues describing ceratosaurid teeth from the Late Jurassic Tacuarembó Formation of Uruguay agreed with their conclusion. They also reevaluated Ostafrikasaurus as a ceratosaurid, based on similarity with the teeth they described.

== Description ==
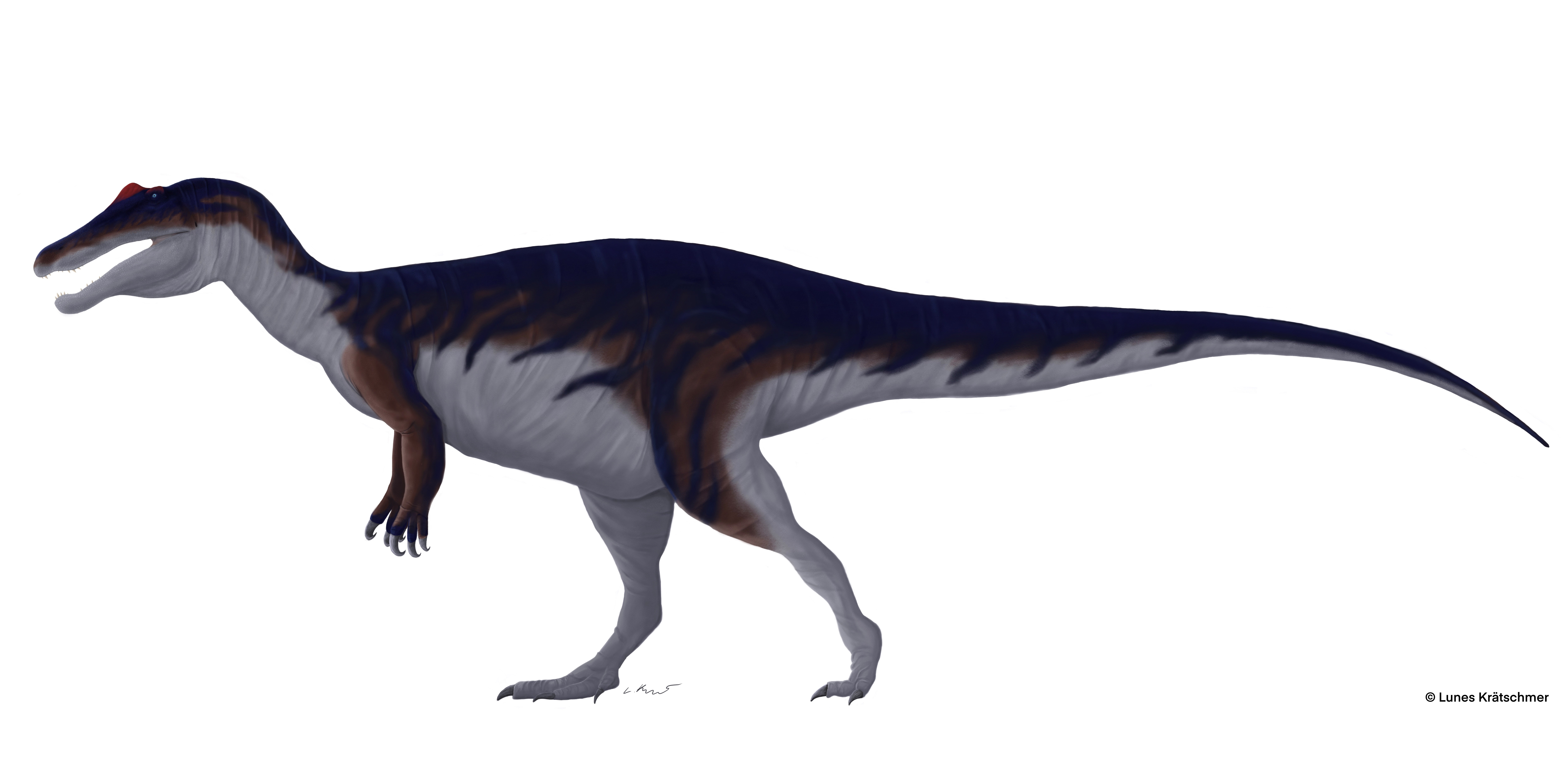
Hypothetical life reconstruction of Ostafrikasaurus as a primitive spinosaurid

The body size of Ostafrikasaurus cannot be reliably calculated to due the highly incomplete nature of current material.

The holotype tooth is thick, somewhat flattened sideways, and 46 millimetres (1.8 inches) in length from top to bottom. Its tip has been rounded by erosion and the base is not fully preserved. The tooth crown has well-defined carinae (cutting edges), with the front carina being curved and the back carina almost straight. There is only mild side-to-side curvature. Both carinae are serrated, with rounded denticles perpendicular to the edge of the tooth. The serrations have no inderdenticle sulci, or grooves, in between them. They line the front carina from the base to its tip, and probably also did on the back carina, whose base has been largely eroded. Towards the tip of the tooth, these serrations are very worn down (especially on the front carina). On the front carina, there are two denticles per mm (0.04 in) near the tip of the tooth, and three to four per mm (0.04 in) as the denticles shrink towards the base of the crown. There are two denticles per mm (0.04 in) all along the back carina.

The enamel (outermost layer) of the tooth bears a series of ridges on its surface – 10 on the lingual side, and four fainter, less extensive ones on the labial side. The gaps between ridges are 1 mm (0.039 in) wide at most. None of the ridges on either side reach the tip of the crown. There is a 3 mm (0.12 in) wide region at the front of the tooth on both sides that lacks ridges; a similar area on the rear of the tooth side diminishes in width, from 8 to 4 mm (0.31 to 0.16 in) as it approaches the tip of the crown. On both sides of the tooth, between the ridges and ridge-less parts of the teeth, the enamel surface is finely wrinkled.

== Classification ==
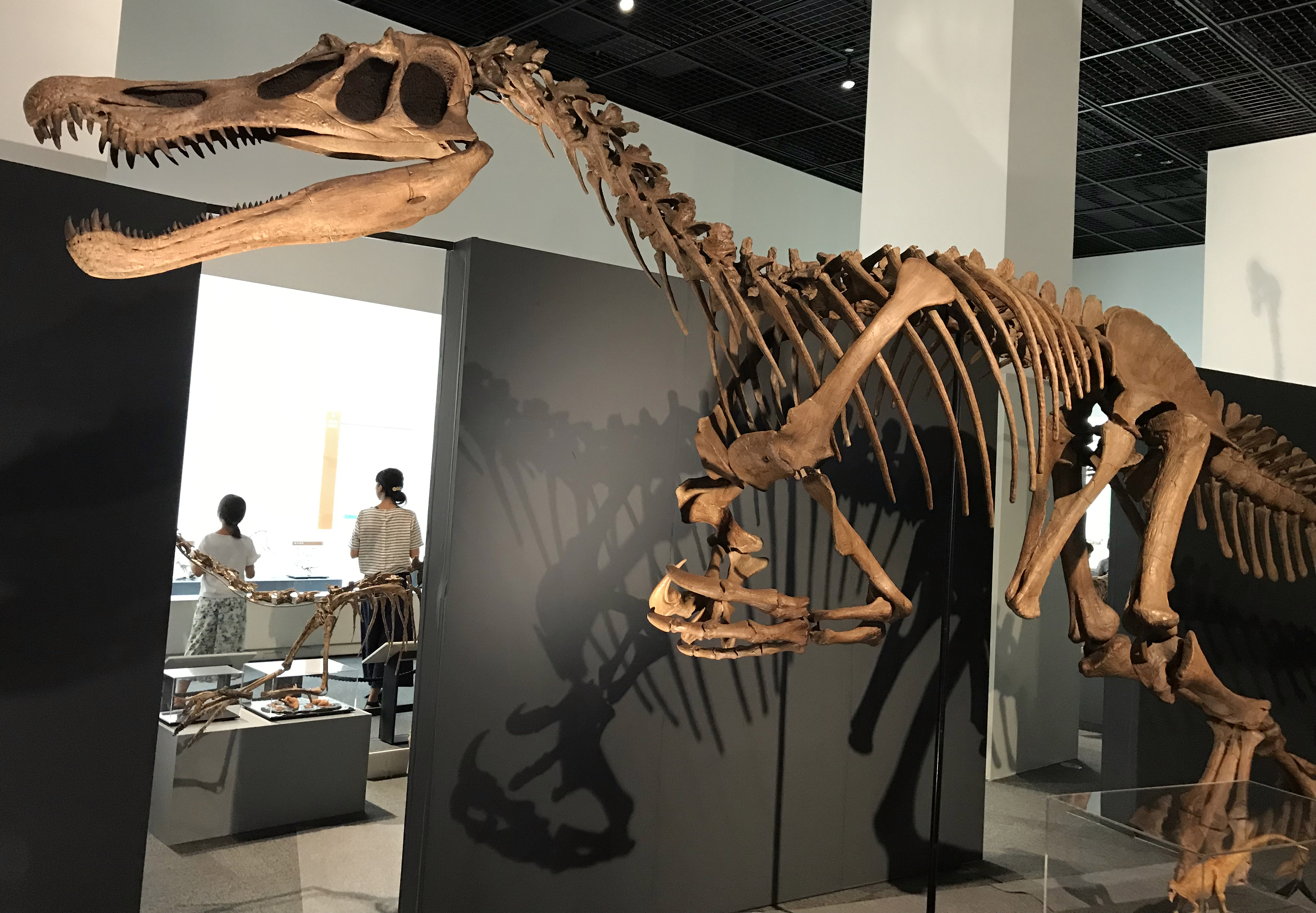
Reconstructed skeleton of Baryonyx, a spinosaurid from the Early Cretaceous of western Europe

Spinosaurids are usually separated into two subfamilies: Baryonychinae and Spinosaurinae. In regards to dental traits, baryonychines are characterized by slightly curved, finely-serrated teeth with more oval cross sections, while spinosaurine teeth are straight, bear highly reduced or completely absent serrations, have more circular cross sections, and bear prominent flutes (lengthwise grooves) on their enamel. In 2007, Fowler interpreted the L.? stechowi teeth as representing a possible primitive baryonychine or ancestral form to baryonychines, since they share features, such as tightly packed serrations, stout shape, marginally flattened tooth crowns, and ridges on their lingual face, typically associated with that clade. In 2008, Buffetaut separated only Janensch's morphotype a (MB R 1084) and d (MB R 1091) as having baryonychine characteristics, which in the former included its general form, somewhat flattened cross section, finely wrinkled enamel, ridges that do not reach the tip of the tooth, and having more ridges on the lingual than labial side. In MB R 1091, only one side of the tooth has ridges, which can also be observed in the teeth of Baryonyx's holotype specimen. Furthermore, Buffetaut added that the only resemblance the other types (b, c, and e) share with Janensch's type a and d is ridges covering part of the tooth crown, while in all other aspects, such as their shape and cross section, they are substantially different. In Buffetaut's analysis, types b, c, and e are probably ceratosaurid in origin, while type a likely represents an early spinosaurid that is different from Early Cretaceous baryonychines.

Rauhut doubted this interpretation in 2011, stating that MB R 1084 has more similarities than differences with Ceratosaurus? stechowi teeth, like the rounded cross section, only marginal curvature of the crown, a more convex lingual than labial side, and similar size and shape of the denticles. Thus, according to his analysis, only the ridge count and distribution were left as unique to MB R 1084. Rauhut noted that though baryonychines also have ridges on either side of their teeth, they are usually most developed at the rear of the tooth, whereas MB R 1084 lacks ridges on that side. He also asserts that the wrinkling Buffetaut observed in MB R 1084's enamel is very faint and largely restricted to the lingual side, compared to the more conspicuously grainy texture of Baryonyx teeth. According to Rauhut, though MB R 1084 is potentially spinosaurid in origin, it shares only generic resemblance to baryonychine teeth, and instead probably represents a close relative of Ceratosaurus? stechowi. In Buffetaut's 2012 naming of Ostafrikasaurus, he placed it in the Spinosauridae, asserting instead that the tooth is very much akin to those of baryonychines including Baryonyx. Among their shared dental features he included the slight sideways-flattening of the crown, fine enamel wrinkles, and ridges on both sides that do not reach the tooth tip, and are stronger and more numerous on the lingual than labial face. If this identification is correct, Ostafrikasaurus represents some of the earliest known evidence of spinosaurids.

The naming and distinction of new dinosaurs based solely on teeth has been frequently considered problematic by palaeontologists, such as with the debated identity of the Asian genus Siamosaurus. Buffetaut stated that with thorough comparison and analysis of morphological features such as ornamentation, theropod teeth can be sufficiently diagnostic enough to raise new taxa. Furthermore, spinosaurid teeth in particular share a unique morphology very divergent to those of other theropods. Nevertheless, the precise identification of Ostafrikasaurus is still unclear, and researchers have pointed out similarities in its enamel ornamentation with Ceratosaurus, Paronychodon, Zapsalis, Acheroraptor, and Coelophysis.

In 2020, Soto and colleagues included the holotype of Ostafrikasaurus within their morphometric analyses which aimed to classify the ceratosaurid teeth they were describing. The authors found in their cluster analyses that Ostafrikasaurus constantly clusters with other ceratosaurid teeth. Conversely, the discriminant and phylogenetic results were more ambiguous and resulted in various possible classifications, with support for carcharodontosaurid, ceratosaurid, and spinosaurid positions. Nevertheless, the authors of the paper regarded a non-spinosaurid classification of the tooth more likely as they said the tooth has interdenticular sulci ("blood grooves"), a feature Buffetaut did not notice and is not present in spinosaurids, but is present in other large theropods. Furthermore, they noted that the only differences between it and the Tendaguru ceratosaurid teeth is that it has a higher number of lingual flutes, flutes on the labial side, and a mesial carina reaching the base of the crown. These differences were attributed to individual variation, as the authors noted Masiakasaurus, also a ceratosaur, varies in its fluting on both sides, labial and lingual among its teeth, while the mesial carina of the crown is intraspecifically variable in lateral teeth, so in their view, it could conceivably vary in mesial teeth as well. Thus, Soto and colleagues conclude that it is more parsimonious for MB R 1084 to be considered a ceratosaurid tooth rather than a member of Spinosauridae, a family that it shares no diagnostic features of.

=== Evolution ===
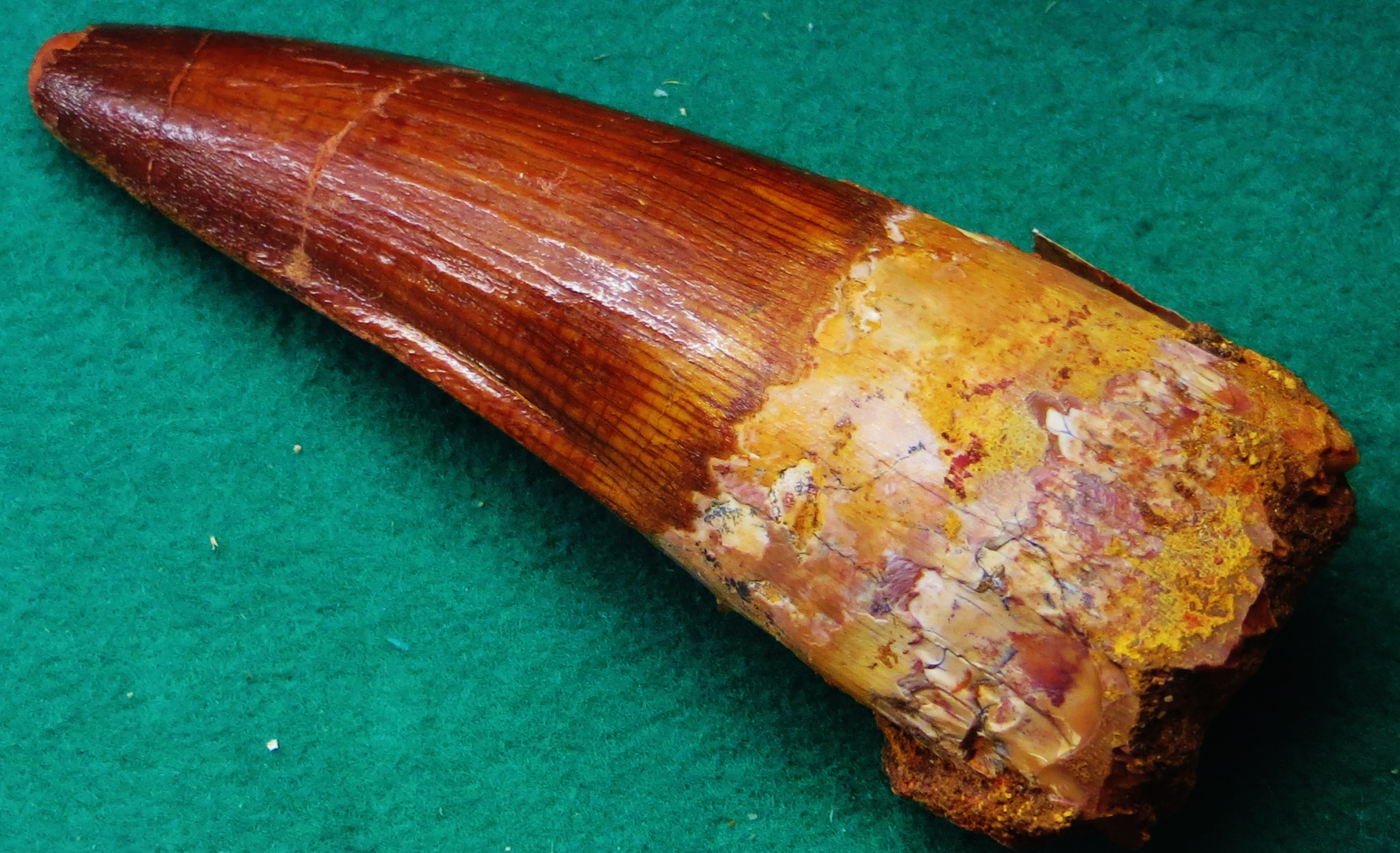
Tooth of the related genus Spinosaurus, Museo di Storia Naturale A. Stoppani, Lombardy

The main difference between MB R 1084 and all other known spinosaurid teeth, as Buffetaut noted, was in the large size of the denticles borne by the carinae. This led him to hypothesize in 2008 that spinosaurid dental evolution was largely characterized by the shrinking and eventual loss of serrations. In 2012, Buffetaut posited that this pattern would begin with large serrations in primitive Jurassic taxa like Ostafrikasaurus (from the Tithonian age), which resembled those of typical, similarly sized theropods. These would then evolve into the fine, reduced, and more numerous serrations of Early Cretaceous baryonychines, like Baryonyx from the Barremian of Europe, and Suchomimus from the Aptian to Albian of West Africa. Baryonyx, for example, had seven denticles per mm (0.04 in) in comparison to Ostafrikasaurus's two to four. Finally, the denticles would disappear entirely in spinosaurines such as Spinosaurus from the Albian to Turonian of North Africa. Buffetaut points out that the heavily diminished serrations in taxa like Siamosaurus, from the Barremian of Thailand, seem to represent an intermediate form. He also noted similarities between Ostafrikasaurus's dentition and a set of Baryonyx-like teeth from the pre-Aptian Cabao Formation of Libya, with potentially important biogeographical implications. These teeth are similar in their general shape, oval-cross section, and wrinkled crown surface, but differ in having smaller serrations, and flutes instead of ridges.

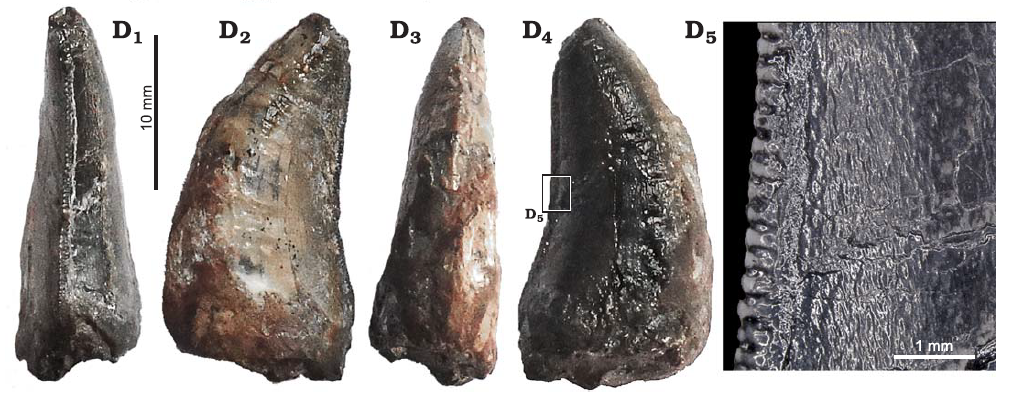
Possible spinosaurid tooth from the Middle Jurassic-aged Tiourarén Formation of Niger in multiple views (D1, D2, D3, D4), and a closeup of the serrations (D5)

In conjunction with their disappearing serrations, the cross sections of spinosaur teeth were initially blade-like and lenticular in earlier taxa like Ostafrikasaurus and Baryonyx, and became more circular in derived forms like Spinosaurus. The ornamentation of spinosaur tooth enamel, however, developed more irregularly than their serrations and cross section shape. Most non-avian theropods generally had smooth teeth with, at most, minimal wrinkles. Ostafrikasaurus teeth in contrast bore strong lengthwise ridges, a feature also seen in Baryonyx and its close relatives, though their prominence varies between taxa. Spinosaurus teeth, like those of typical theropods, were usually smooth, and Asian forms like Siamosaurus exhibited an increase in the amount of dental ridges. Furthermore, the tooth crown was wrinkled in Ostafrikasaurus, Baryonyx, and Suchomimus, and Asian spinosaurids, but smooth in Spinosaurus, with only some specimens of the latter showing fine wrinkles.

In 2016, Spanish palaeontologist Aleandro Serrano-Martínez and colleagues described a possible spinosaurid tooth, catalogued as MUPE HB-87, from the Irhazer Shale of Niger. Found in association with a skeleton of the sauropod dinosaur Spinophorosaurus, the tooth likely dates to the Bathonian stage of the Middle Jurassic, 14 million years prior to Ostafrikasaurus. If this identification is correct, MUPE HB-87 represents the oldest known evidence of spinosaurids in the fossil record. Based on this specimen, the authors proposed a new evolutionary model for the transition between "normal" theropod teeth, to those of spinosaurids. The tooth is oval in cross section, is recurved, and bears small serrations, as well as strong fluting that does not reach the tip of the crown. However, this specimen has been noted by other researchers to possess many non-spinosaurid features, these researchers instead favoring a megalosaurid identification.

== Palaeobiology ==
Though no skull material has been discovered for Ostafrikasaurus, it is known that spinosaurid skulls resembled those of crocodiles; they were long, low, narrow and expanded at their front ends into a terminal rosette-like shape, with a robust secondary palate on the roof of the mouth that made them more resistant to stress and bending. In contrast, the primitive and typical condition for theropods was a tall, broader and wedge-like snout with a less developed secondary palate. The skull adaptations of spinosaurids converged with those of crocodilians; early members of the latter group had skulls similar to typical non-avian (or non-bird) theropods, later developing elongated snouts, conical teeth, and secondary palates. These adaptations may have been the result of a dietary change from terrestrial prey to fish. In 2012, Buffetaut suggested that the reduction of serrations on spinosaurid teeth illustrated by Ostafrikasaurus may represent a transition during this shift in diet.

== Palaeoenvironment and palaeobiogeography ==
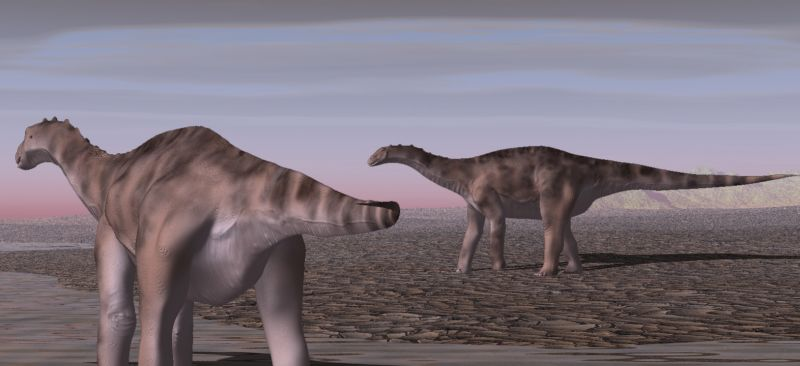
Depiction of two Dicraeosaurus traversing tidal flats in the Tendaguru Formation

The Upper Dinosaur Member of the Tendaguru Formation is composed mostly of siltstones, calcareous sandstones, and claystone beds. These rocks likely date back to the Tithonian stage of the Late Jurassic Period, approximately 152.1 to 145 million years ago. However, the precise chronological boundary between the Early Cretaceous and Late Jurassic of the Tendaguru Formation is still unclear. Ostafrikasaurus' habitat would have been subtropical to tropical, shifting between periodic rainfall and pronounced dry seasons. Three types of palaeoenvironments were present at the Tendaguru Formation, the first was a shallow water marine setting with lagoon-like conditions shielded behind shoals of ooid and siliciclastic rocks, evidently subjected to tides and storms. The second was a coastal environment of tidal flats, consisting of brackish water lakes, ponds, and fluvial channels. There was little plant life at this ecosystem for sauropod dinosaurs to feed on and most dinosaurs likely came to the area only during droughts. The third and most inland habitat would have been dominated by conifer plants in a well-vegetated area, offering a large feeding ground for sauropods.

The Tendaguru Formation was home to a diverse abundance of organisms. Invertebrates like bivalves, gastropods, oysters, echinoderms, arthropods, brachiopods, corals, and many microfauna, including ostracods, foraminifera, charophytes, and palynomorphs are known from the deposits. Sauropod dinosaurs were prominent in the region, represented by Giraffatitan brancai, Dicraeosaurus hansemanni and D. sattleri, Australodocus bohetii, Janenschia robusta, Tornieria africana, Tendaguria tanzaniensis, Wamweracaudia keranjei, as well as indeterminate diplodocids, flagellicaudatans, and turiasaurians. They would have coexisted with low-browsing ornithischians like the ornithopod Dysalotosaurus lettowvorbecki, and the stegosaurian Kentrosaurus aethiopicus. Theropods besides Ostafrikasaurus included the carcharodontosaurid Veterupristisaurus milneri and the noasaurid Elaphrosaurus bambergi. Fragmentary fossils also indicate the presence of a basal ceratosaurid (Ceratosaurus? stechowi) and tetanuran, an unidentified abelisauroid, as well as a possible abelisaurid, carcharodontosaurid, and megalosauroid.

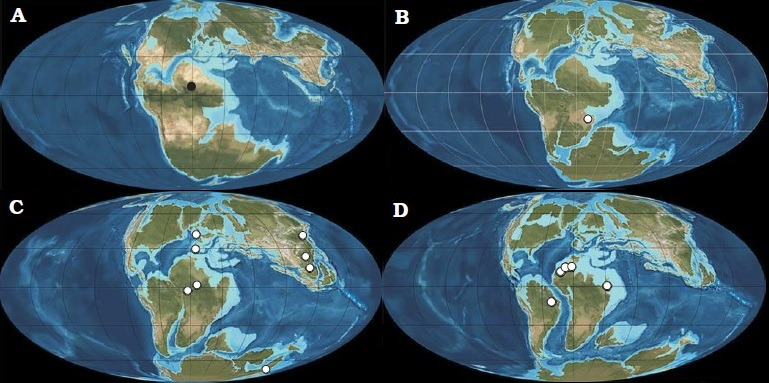
Generalised locations of spinosaurid fossil discoveries from the Bajocian–Bathonian (A), Tithonian (B), Barremian−Aptian (C), and Albian−Cenomanian (D) marked on maps of those time spans.

Other vertebrates that shared this environment included pterosaurs such as Tendaguripterus recki, and an indeterminate dsungaripteroid, azhdarchid, and possible archaeopterodactyloid. There was also the dwarf crocodyliform Bernissartia sp., lissamphibian amphibians, paramacellodid lizards, and various small mammals, including Brancatherulum tendagurense, Allostaffia aenigmatica, Tendagurodon janenschi, Tendagurutherium dietrichi, and multiple unidentified symmetrodonts. The aquatic fauna of the region has been revealed by fossils of the actinopterygiian Lepidotes tendaguriensis and L. sp., the ray Engaibatis schultzei, and hybodont sharks like Hybodus sp., Lonchidion sp., and Sphenodus sp. The flora of the Tendaguru Formation was equally varied, with vegetation consisting of araucarians, cypresses, cycads, yews, Cheirolepidiaceae, Ginkgoaceae, and Prasinophyta. There were also dinoflagellate and Zygnemataceae algae, as well as numerous pollen and spore taxa.

In 2007, Fowler noted that a baryonychine identification for the L.? stechowi teeth would suit biogeographical models proposed at the time for spinosaur evolution and distribution, which assumed an origin for the group in the southern supercontinent Gondwana, with later spread and diversification in Europe. In 2012, Buffetaut noted that the presence of such a basal genus as Ostafrikasaurus in Africa does not necessarily indicate that spinosaurids originated there. Instead, the group may have been widespread early in its evolutionary history, with other taxa inhabiting North America, Europe, and the rest of Gondwana contemporaneously with Ostafrikasaurus. Buffetaut deemed this especially likely due to the discovery of spinosaurid fossils in Asia, which was likely separated from the other continents during much of the Late Jurassic and Early Cretaceous as Pangaea continued breaking apart, thus how the group arrived in Asia is still uncertain. An early global distribution for the group was also deemed probable by authors such as Stephen Brusatte and colleagues in 2010, and Ronan Allain and colleagues in 2012, the latter having suggested that such a spread may have occurred earlier across Pangaea, prior to its breakup starting in the Late Jurassic. The palaeobiogeography of spinosaurids remains poorly understood, and was likely very complex, given discoveries in Asia and possibly Australia, as well as the resemblance between some European and Asian taxa. If Ostafrikasaurus represents a ceratosaurid instead, it adds to the list of former "spinosaurid" specimens from the Jurassic now reidentified.
