= Boheti bin Amrani =

Tanzanian farmer

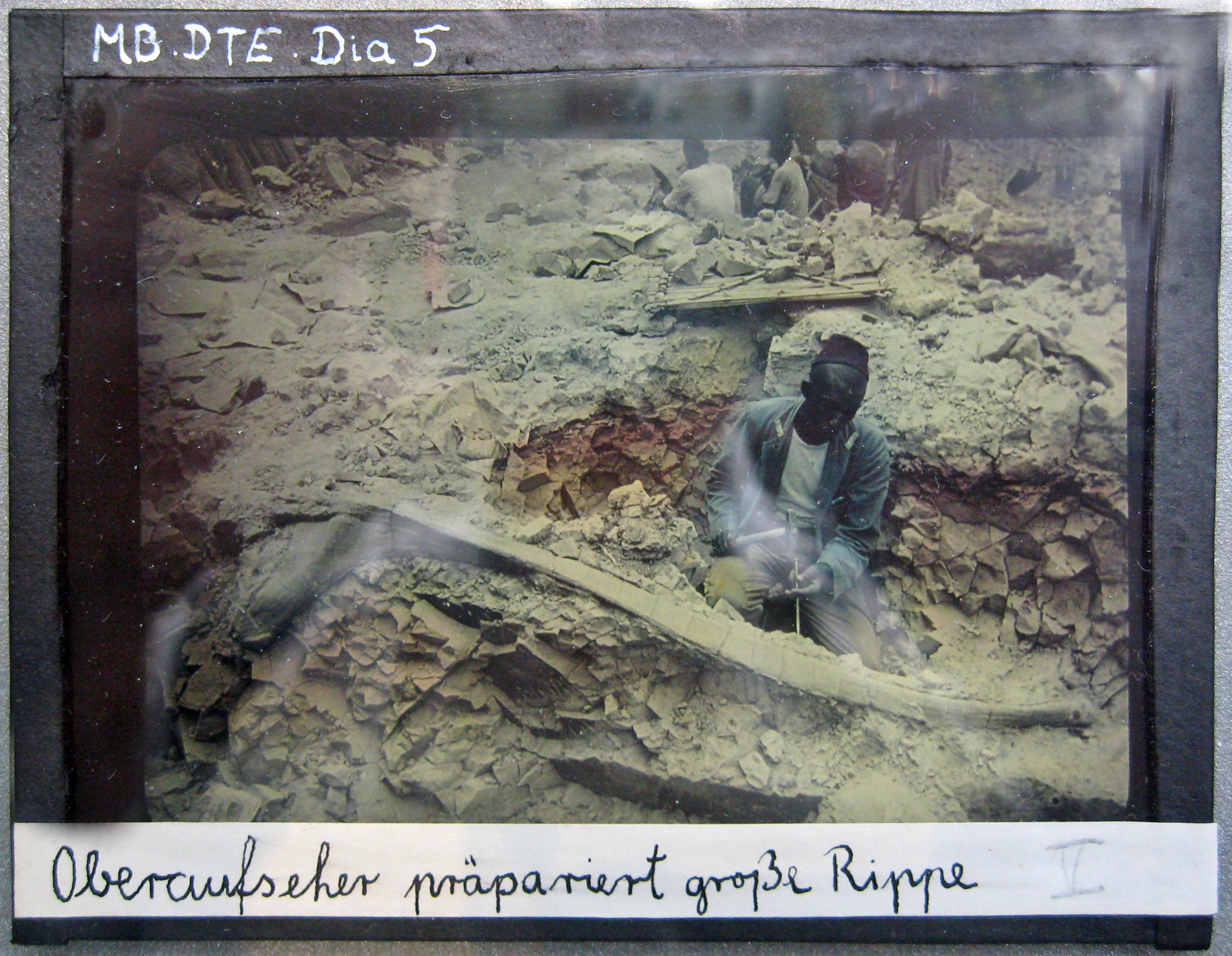
- Boheti bin Amrani preparing a rib
- Known for: Chief supervisor and preparator for the German–Tanzanian expedition in the Tendaguru Formation

Boheti bin Amrani was a Tanzanian farmer. In 1909 he served first as a guide, and then the chief supervisor and preparator for the 1909–1913 German Tendaguru Expedition. A sauropod dinosaur, Australodocus bohetii, was named after him in 2007.

== Expeditions ==
On April 12, 1909, Boheti, who owned a plot of land in Lindi, was hired by palaeontologists Werner Janensch and Edwin Hennig as a guide. He travelled with Hennig to the village of Ubolelo, roughly 15 km (9.3 mi) from Tendaguru Hill, uncovering deposits worthy of future excavation. Boheti established several quarries in the surrounding area. After the further discovery and preparation of several fossils, Boheti grew to be considered the most skilled and trusted of the expedition's overseers (later becoming head overseer) and Hennig began to consider him a suitable candidate for the further preparation of fossils in Berlin. From October onwards, Boheti was involved in preparing a find dubbed "Skeleton S", two partial individuals which Janensch used as the holotype and lectotype of Brachiosaurus brancai. In January of 1911, the German team left Tendaguru. Boheti was still excavating in the area during the arrival of Hans and Ina Reck in 1912, whereupon he was reinstated as head overseer. In 1924, he was hired by anthropologist Louis Leakey. Boheti was sporadically involved in subsequent operations between 1925 and 1926, under William Edmund Cutler and Frederick Migeod. In 1930, F. R. Parrington arrived, and Boheti worked as head overseer for his eleventh and last year. Edwin Hennig and Boheti corresponded at some point in that decade, by which point the latter's eyesight had deteriorated due to illness.

== Legacy ==
Boheti bin Amrani was commemorated in a 1998 booklet, Dinosauria wa Tendaguri (Dinosaurs of Tendaguru), which featured a character by the name of Mzee Buheti. In 2007, a somphospondyl sauropod discovered during the initial 1909 expedition was named Australodocus bohetii after him.
