= Hennig =

Hennig is both a surname and a given name. Notable people with the name include:

Surname:

- Amy Hennig (born 1964), video game director and writer
- Angela Hennig (born 1981), German cyclist
- Anke Hennig (born 1964), German politician
- Arthur Saxon (born Arthur Hennig, 1878–1921), German strongman and circus performer
- Bernard A. Hennig (1917-2014), American philatelist
- Carsten Hennig (born 1976), German football player
- Curt Hennig (1958–2003), American wrestler known as "Mr. Perfect"
- Danielle Hennig (born 1990), Canadian field hockey player
- Dennis Hennig (1951–1993), Australian pianist
- Edgar Hennig (1897-1994), American baseball player
- Edward Hennig (1879–1960), American Olympic gymnast
- Edwin Hennig (1882-1977), German paleontologist
- Gerd Hennig (1935–2017), German football referee
- Heike Hennig (born 1966), German dancer, choreographer and theatre director
- Heinz Hennig (1927–2002), German choral conductor
- Jack Hennig (born 1946), Canadian singer-songwriter
- Jessica Hennig (born 1988), German politician
- Joe Hennig (born 1979), American wrestler better known as Curtis Axel, son of Curt
- John Hennig (1911-1986), German theologian
- Jürgen Hennig (born 1951), German chemist and medical physicist
- Kate Hennig (born 1961 or 1962), Canadian actress and playwright
- Katharina Hennig (born 1996), German cross-country skier
- Klaus Hennig (born 1944), German judo athlete
- Klaus-Peter Hennig (born 1947), German Olympic discus thrower
- Larry Hennig (1936–2018), American wrestler known as "The Axe", father of Curt
- Mark A. Hennig (born 1965), American horse racing trainer
- Maximilian Hennig (born 2006), German footballer
- Michael Hennig (born 1955), German Olympic weightlifter
- Oloff Hennig, South African businessman
- Paulina Hennig-Kloska (born 1977), Polish politician
- Roland Hennig (born 1967), German Olympic cyclist
- Rudolph Hennig (1886-1969), Canadian politician
- Scott Hennig (born 1969), American pole vault athlete
- Shelley Hennig (born 1987), Miss Teen USA 2004, and actress, Days of our Lives and Teen Wolf
- Susanne Hennig-Wellsow (born 1977), German politician
- Todd Hennig (born 1976), American drummer, Death by Stereo, and Nations Afire
- Walter Hennig (born 1972), South African businessman
- Willi Hennig (1913–1976), German biologist considered the founder of phylogenetic systematics, also known as cladistics
- Christine Theiss (née Hennig), (born 1980), German kickboxer

Given name:

- Hennig Brand (1630–1710), German alchemist who discovered phosphorus

== See also ==
- Henning Frenzel
