= Hennis =

Hennis is a Dutch language surname, which is a variant of Hennig, and is derived from the given name Hans or Johannes. The name may refer to:

- Jeanine Hennis-Plasschaert (born 1973), Dutch politician
- Peter Hennis (1802–1833), British doctor
- Randy Hennis (born 1965), American baseball player
- Wilhelm Hennis (1923–2012), German political scientist

== Other uses ==
- Edgar Harvey Hennis House, North Carolina
