= Oloff =

Oloff is a given name. Notable people with the name include:

- Oloff Hennig (fl. 20th century), South African businessman
- Oloff Smith (1833–?), Swedish-born American Union Navy sailor
- Oloff Johannes Truter (1829–1881), South African civil servant
