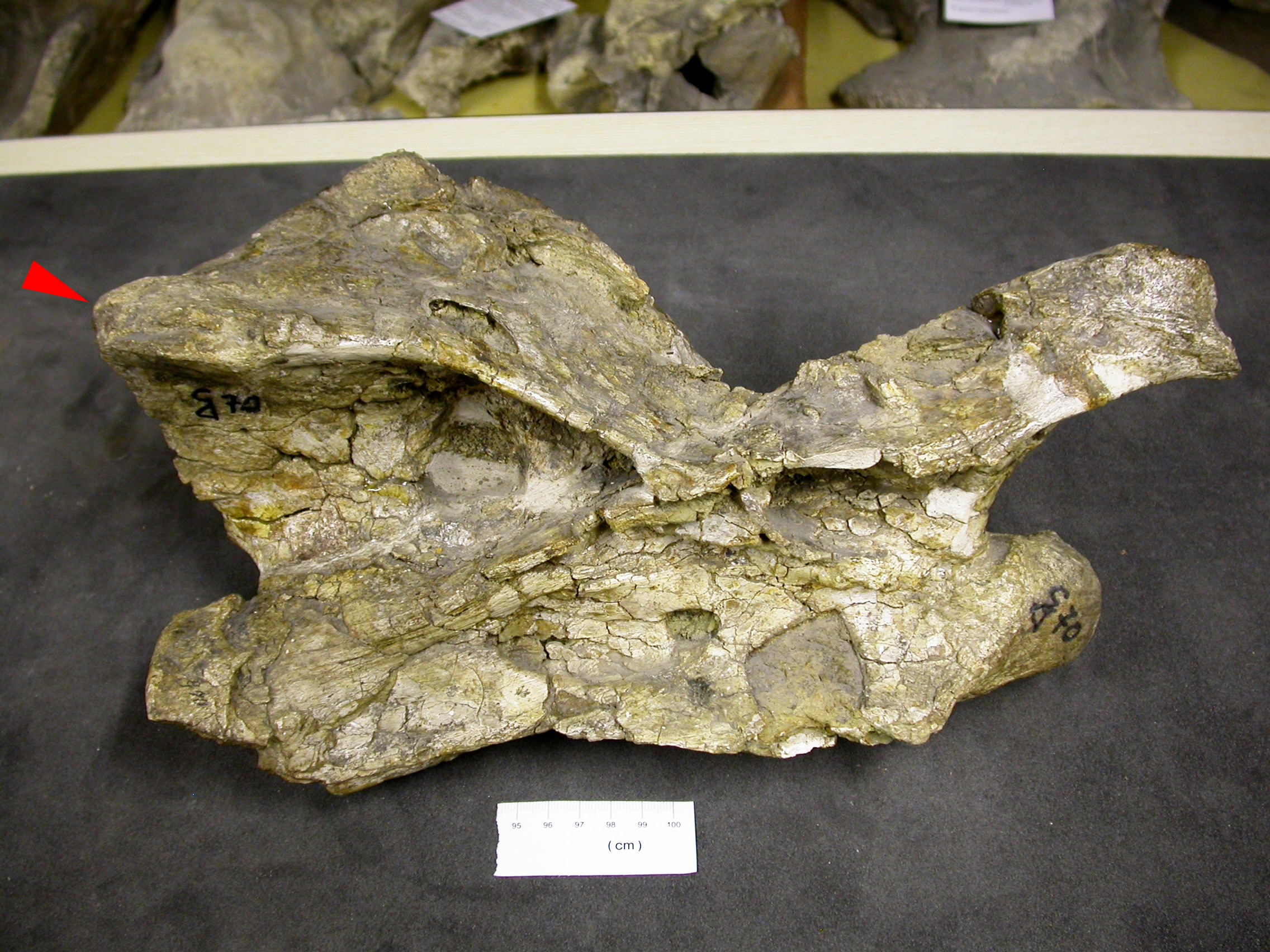
- Holotype cervical vertebra

Scientific classification
- Kingdom: Animalia
- Phylum: Chordata
- Class: Reptilia
- Clade: Dinosauria
- Clade: Saurischia
- Clade: †Sauropodomorpha
- Clade: †Sauropoda
- Clade: †Macronaria
- Clade: †Titanosauriformes
- Clade: †Somphospondyli
- Genus: †Australodocus; Remes, 2007
- Species: †A. bohetii

Binomial name
- †Australodocus bohetii Remes, 2007

= Australodocus =

Australodocus Temporal range: Late Jurassic, 150–145 Ma

Extinct genus of dinosaurs

Australodocus (meaning "southern beam" from the Latin australis "southern" and the Greek dokos/δοκоς "beam") is a genus of sauropod dinosaur that lived during the Late Jurassic period, around 150 million years ago, in what is now Lindi Region, Tanzania. Though initially considered a diplodocid, recent analyses suggest it may instead be a titanosauriform.

== Discovery and naming ==
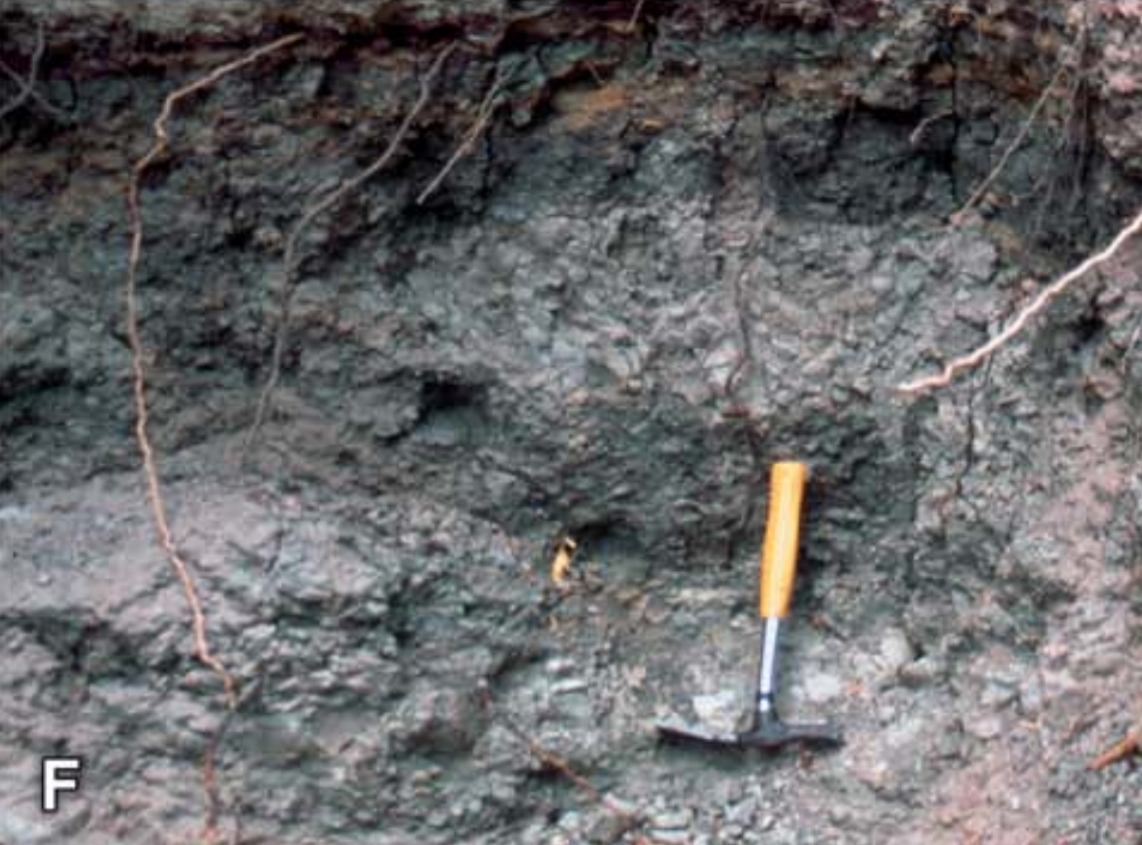
The Upper Dinosaur Member, which is the layer of the Tendaguru Formation that the holotype was recovered from

From 1909-1913, the Berlin Museum of Natural History launched a series of expeditions to outcrops of the Tendaguru Formation of Tanzania (then German East Africa). These ventures collected hundreds of tones of fossils, especially those of dinosaurs, and brought them back to Berlin. The remains of Australodocus bohetii were recovered in 1909 from the Upper Dinosaur Member of the Tendaguru Formation of Tanzania, which has been a fertile ground for many Jurassic dinosaurs, including several genera of large sauropods, such as Giraffatitan, Wamweracaudia, Janenschia, Tendaguria, and Tornieria. Australodocus itself is based on two neck vertebrae, which are less elongate than those of other diplodocids and differ in other anatomical details. These vertebrae were originally part of a series of four vertebrae collected in the 1909 expedition led by Werner Janensch; like some other fossils collected by German expeditions to Africa, the other bones were destroyed in World War II. The 2007 description of the surviving bones increases the known diversity of sauropods and diplodocids in Tendaguru.

The genus name is derived from the fact it was initially considered a southern (Gondwanan) relative of Diplodocus. The species name honors Boheti bin Amrani, a native crew supervisor and chief preparator who was an important contributor to the German expeditions that first excavated the Tanzanian sites.

== Systematics ==
Skeletal reconstruction of A. bohetii showing only the figured vertebrae and not including the destroyed vertebrae

Australodocus was originally described as a diplodocid, because it had double (bifurcate) neural spines on some of its vertebra, a characteristic normally associated with diplodocoid sauropods. However, several later studies by John Whitlock and colleagues found that Australodocus is actually a member of the sauropod clade Titanosauriformes, possibly closely related to Brachiosaurus. The presence of a higher number of macronarian sauropods in the Tendaguru environment compared to numerous diplodocoids in the Morrison Formation may be due to previously known differences in environment, with the Tendaguru being dominated by conifer forest, and the Morrison being dominated by open plains of low-browse flora. Tschopp et al. (2015) recovered Australodocus as a diplodocine diplodocid, closely related to Supersaurus and Dinheirosaurus (which may be a synonym of the former), but stressed that the low number of titanosauriform taxa used in the cladistic analysis made such a placement untenable due to the shared somphospondylous internal structure of Australodocus and somphospondylian titanosauriforms. Mannion et al.(2019) found Australodocus to be a non-titanosaur somphospondyl based on the somphospondylous nature of the internal structure of the cervicals, considering it a potential euhelopodid.

== Size ==
Gregory S. Paul in 2010 estimated its length at about 17 metres (56 ft) and weight at just 4,000 kilograms (8,800 lb).
