= Wilhelm von Branca =

German geologist and paleontologist (1844–1928)

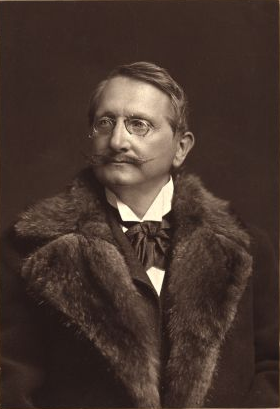
Wilhelm von Branca

Carl Wilhelm Franz von Branca Until 1895: Wilhelm Branco; 1895-1907: Wilhelm von Branco (9 September 1844 – 12 March 1928) was a German geologist and paleontologist.

== Biography ==
Von Branca was born in Potsdam.

After having been an officer, and then a farmer, Branca studied geology in Halle and Heidelberg, receiving his doctorate in 1876. He did postdoctoral work in Straßburg, Berlin, Munich, and in Rome with Karl Alfred von Zittel. In 1881 he received his habilitation from the Friedrich-Wilhelms-University Berlin (today's Humboldt-Universität zu Berlin), where he then worked as a lecturer. After a short stint as a lecturer in Aachen, von Branca became State Geologist at the Prussian Geological State Service in Berlin. From 1887 to 1890 he served as professor for geology and paleontology in Königsberg, until 1895 in Tübingen, then for four years (until 1899) in Hohenheim, until finally settling down in Berlin, where he was professor of geology until 1917, doubling as the director of the Geological-Paleontological museum, one of the three museums that made up the Museum für Naturkunde.

In 1895, he was knighted, and changed his surname to 'Von Branco' (and later to 'Von Branca'). In 1917, von Branca retired from his posts as museum director and professor He died in Munich in 1928.

== Research ==
Von Branca's research covered stratigraphy, volcanism, paleoanthropology, paleontology in general, and especially the evolution of ammonites and extinct vertebrates, including the finds of the German Tendaguru Expedition. Von Branca was one of the driving forces behind that famous excavation effort in what was then German East Africa, and is today Tanzania. In addition, he published about social and religious issues

The plesiosaur Brancasaurus and a species of brachiosaurid dinosaur, Brachiosaurus brancai (by recent research considered the type species of a separate genus, Giraffatitan), were named in his honor.

== Literature ==
- Mogge, Winfried. Wilhelm Branco (1844–1928): Geologe – Paläontologe – Darwinist: Eine Biografie. Vol. 52. Zivilisationen Und Geschichte. Peter Lang, 2018.
- Pompeckj, Josef. “Gedächtnisrede Auf Wilhelm von Branca.” Sitzungsberichte Der Preussischen Akademie Der Wissenschaften Zu Berlin, Physikalisch-Mathematische Klasse, 1928, CXIV–CXXXVII.
- Quenstedt, Werner. “Branca, Karl Wilhelm Franz Von.” In Neue Deutsche Biographie, 2,-514–15. Berlin: Duncker & Humblot, 1955.
- Tamborini, Marco. “‘If the Americans Can Do It, so Can We’: How Dinosaur Bones Shaped German Paleontology.” History of Science 54, no. 3 (2016): 225–56. https://doi.org/10.1177/0073275316671526.

== See also ==
- Edwin Hennig
- Werner Janensch
