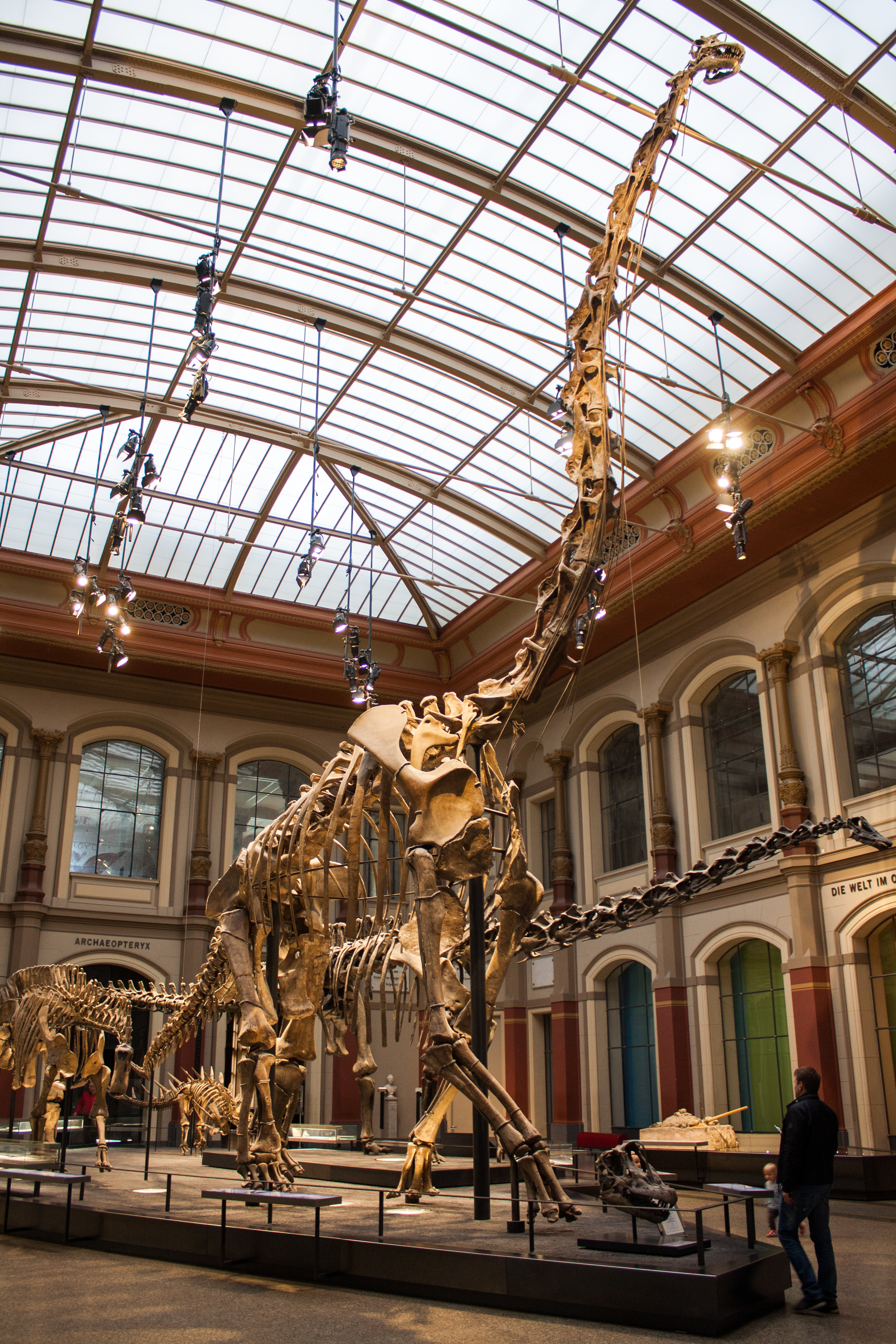
- Mounted skeleton, Berlin's Natural History Museum

Scientific classification
- Kingdom: Animalia
- Phylum: Chordata
- Class: Reptilia
- Clade: Dinosauria
- Clade: Saurischia
- Clade: †Sauropodomorpha
- Clade: †Sauropoda
- Clade: †Eusauropoda
- Clade: †Macronaria
- Family: †Brachiosauridae
- Genus: †Giraffatitan; Paul, 1988

Type species
- †Giraffatitan brancai (Janensch, 1914)

Synonyms
- Brachiosaurus brancai Janensch, 1914; Brachiosaurus fraasi Janensch, 1914

= Giraffatitan =

Giraffatitan Temporal range: Late Jurassic (Tithonian), 150–145 Ma

Sauropod dinosaur genus from the late Jurassic Period in Lindi Region, Tanzania

Giraffatitan (name meaning "titanic giraffe") is a genus of sauropod dinosaur that lived during the late Jurassic Period (Kimmeridgian–Tithonian stages) in what is now Lindi Region, Tanzania. Only one species is known, G. brancai, named in honor of German paleontologist Wilhelm von Branca, who was a driving force behind the expedition that discovered it in the Tendaguru Formation. Giraffatitan brancai was originally described by German paleontologist Werner Janensch as a species of the North American sauropod Brachiosaurus from the Morrison Formation, as Brachiosaurus brancai. Recent research shows that the differences between the type species of Brachiosaurus and the Tendaguru material are so large that the African material should be placed in a separate genus.

Giraffatitan was for many decades known as the largest dinosaur but recent discoveries of several larger dinosaurs prove otherwise; giant titanosaurians appear to have surpassed Giraffatitan in terms of sheer mass. Also, the sauropod dinosaur Sauroposeidon is estimated to be taller and possibly heavier than Giraffatitan. Most size estimates for Giraffatitan are based on the specimen HMN SII, a subadult individual, but there is evidence supporting that these animals could grow larger; specimen HMN XV2, represented by a fibula 13% larger than the corresponding material on HMN SII, would have measured around 23–26 metres (75–85 ft) long and weighed about 40–48 metric tons (44–53 short tons).

== History of discovery ==
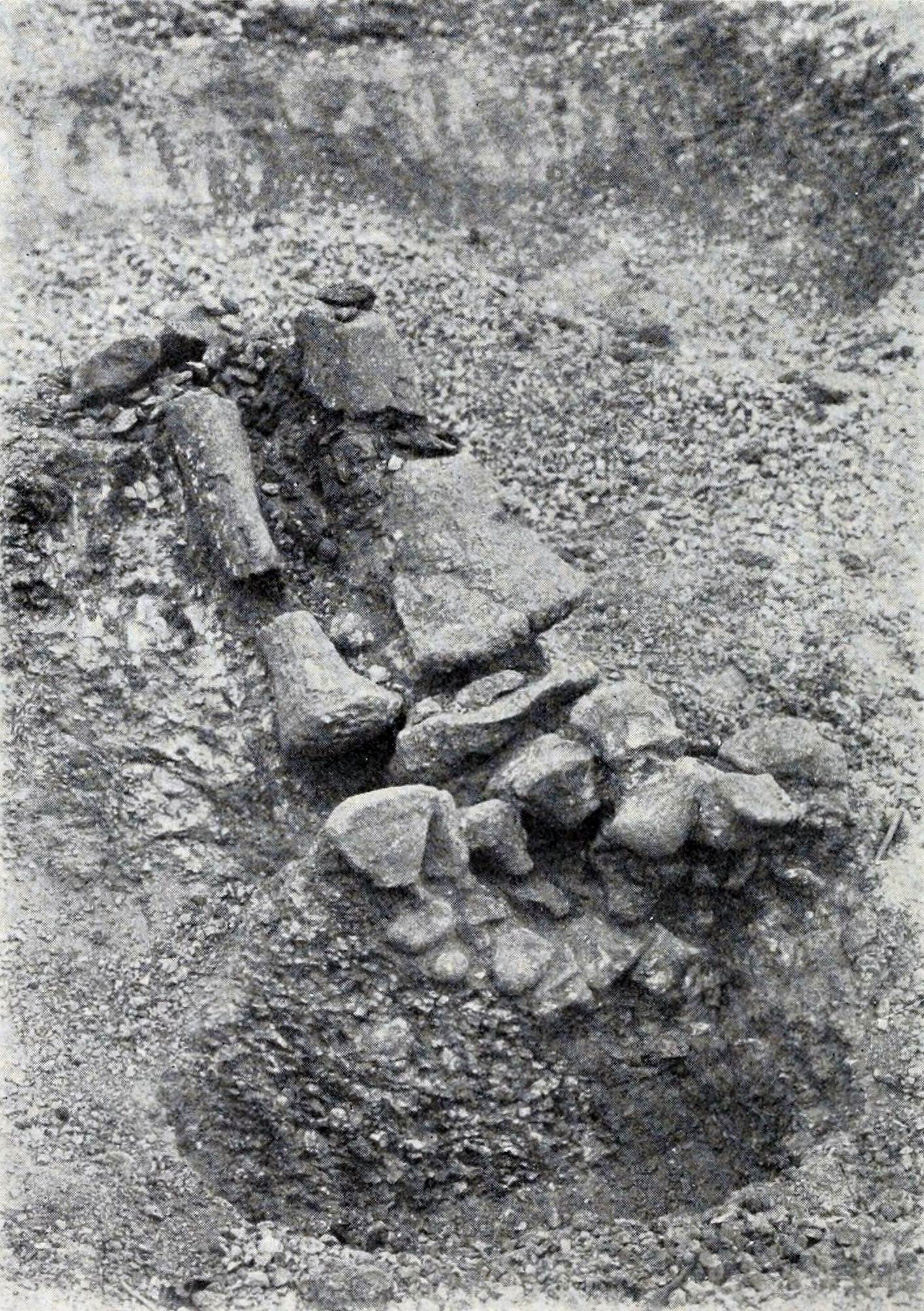
A hindlimb during excavation in the Tendaguru in Lindi Region

In 1906, mining engineer Bernhard Wilhelm Sattler, while travelling, noticed an enormous bone jutting out of the ground at the Tendaguru (the "steep hill") near Lindi, in what was then German East Africa, today Lindi Region, Tanzania. In early 1907, his superior Wilhelm Arning in Hannover received a report on the find. Arning again informed the Kommission für die landeskundliche Erforschung der Schutzgebiete, a commission in Berlin overviewing the geographical investigation of German protectorates. The German secretary of state of colonies, Berhard Dernburg, at the time visited German East Africa accompanied by the industrialist Heinrich Otto. Otto had invited the paleontologist Professor Eberhard Fraas to join him as a scientific advisor. In the summer of 1907, Fraas, already for some months travelling the colony, received a letter from Dr Hans Meyer in Leipzig, urging him to investigate Sattler's discovery. On 30 August, Fraas arrived by steamer at the coastal town of Lindi. A five-day march brought him to the Tendaguru, where he could confirm that the bones were authentic and dinosaurian. Soon Sattler joined him with a team of native miners who uncovered two large sauropod skeletons which were transported to Germany. Ultimately, these would become the holotypes of the genera Tornieria and Janenschia.

Fraas had observed that the Tendaguru layers were exceptionally rich in fossils. After his return to Germany, he tried to raise enough money for a major expedition. He managed to attract the interest of Professor Wilhelm von Branca, the head of the Geologisch-Paläontologische Institut und Museum der Königliche Friedrich-Wilhelm Universität zu Berlin. Von Branca considered it a matter of German national pride that such a project would succeed. He involved the well-connected pathologist David von Hansemann. Von Hansemann founded a Tendaguru Committee headed by Johann Albrecht, the Duke of Mecklenburg. Soon it became fashionable to join this committee which counted a large number of prominent German industrialists and scientists among its members. Many of their wealthy friends donated considerable sums. To lead the expedition, von Branca sent out one of his curators, Werner Janensch, and one of his assistants, Edwin Hennig. Both men arrived in Dar es Salaam on 2 April 1909.

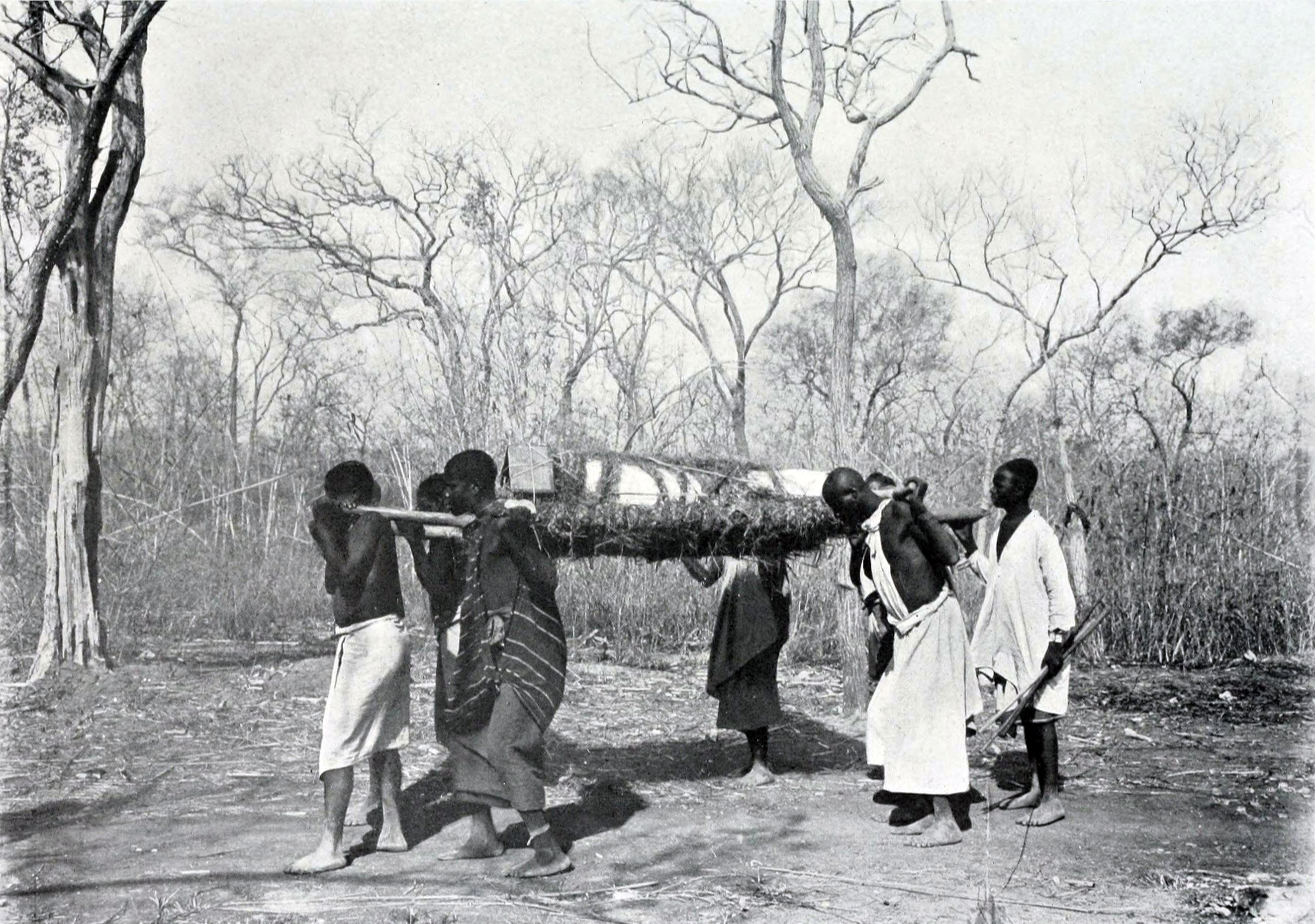
Porters carrying a large bone at the Tendaguru

The expedition initially employed about 160 native porters, as beasts of burden could not be used because of the danger posed by the tse tse fly. During four field seasons, of 1909, 1910, 1911 and 1912, about a hundred paleontological quarries were opened. Large amounts of fossil material were shipped to Germany. Soon it became evident that apart from Tornieria and Janenschia, other sauropods were present in the layers. One was the medium-sized Dicraeosaurus, a relatively common find. More rare was a gigantic form that far surpassed the others in magnitude and that is today known as Giraffatitan. The first quarry with Giraffatitan material was "Site D", located about 1 km (0.62 mi) northeast of the Tendaguru Hill and opened on 21 June 1909. It contained a relatively complete skeleton of a medium-sized individual, lacking the hands, the neck, the back vertebrae and the skull. It included an articulated series of 29 tail vertebrae. The other bones were found in close association on a surface of 22 m^{2} (240 sq ft). "Site IX", located 1.4 km (0.87 mi) northeast of the Tendaguru Hill, was opened on 17 August 1909. Among an assemblage of 150 disarticulated dinosaur bones, also two Giraffatitan thighbones were present. The next Giraffatitan quarry was "Site N", at 900 m (0.56 mi) east of the Tendaguru Hill, excavated in September 1909. It held a single disarticulated skeleton containing a back vertebra, a tail vertebra, ribs, a scapula, a possible scapula, a humerus, two ischia and a number of unidentifiable bones.

The most important source of Giraffatitan fossils would be "Site S" at one kilometre southwest of the hill. Excavations started on 11 October 1909 and continued well into 1912. In 1909 limb and girdle elements were dug up. During 1910, a cut bank of the Kitukituki river was gradually deepened, removing a high overburden. To prevent the quarry walls from collapsing, they were covered by a high wooden framework. That year, first several ribs were uncovered and later part of the vertebral column. In October, close to some neck vertebrae a skull and lower jaws were discovered. From 5 June 1912 onwards more neck and trunk vertebrae were found. Initially it was thought that a single skeleton was being uncovered. Only much later Janensch realised that two skeletons had been present. Skelett SI was represented by a skull, six neck vertebrae and some back vertebrae. Skelett SII was larger but despite its size still a subadult individual. It included skull bones, a series of eleven neck and eleven back vertebrae, ribs, the left scapula, both coracoids, both forelimbs, the pubic bones and the right hindlimb. The sacrum and the tail had been lost to relatively recent erosion. The animal was found in an upright position with vertical limbs, which has been explained by its becoming mired in mud.

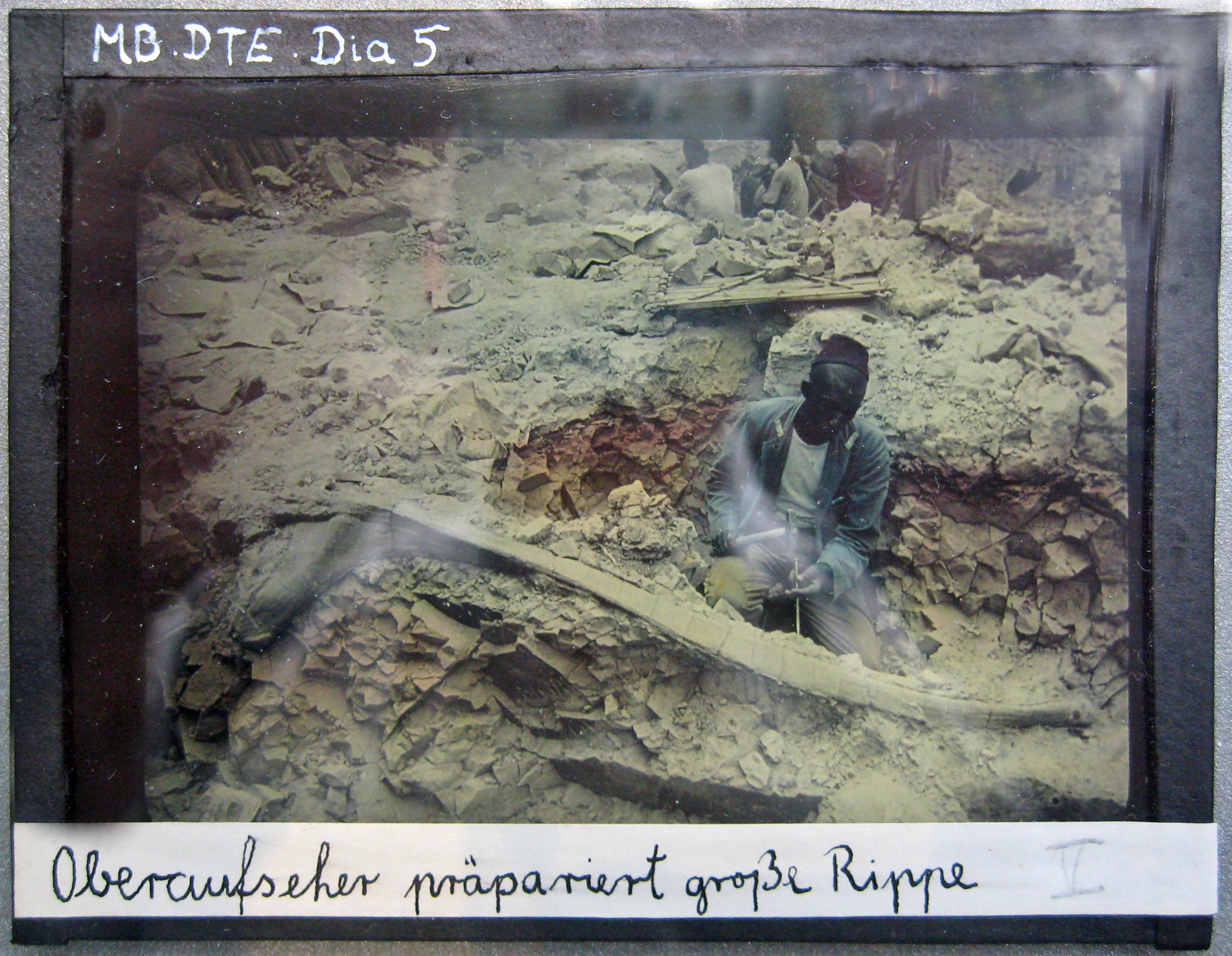
Foreman Boheti bin Amrani preparing a large rib

In early October 1909, "Site ab" was excavated, 1.2 km (0.75 mi) northeast of the hill. Among disarticulated remains of many sauropods, also two Giraffatitan thighbones were collected. A gigantic possible humerus was too damaged to be salvaged. "Site cc", 2.9 km (1.8 mi) northeast of the hill, contained a disarticulated Giraffatitan skeleton including neck vertebrae, a trunk vertebra, ribs, a scapula and a humerus. In 1910, another Giraffatitan quarry was opened, "Site Y" at 3.1 km (1.9 mi) north of the Tendaguru Hill. It contained the skeleton of a medium-sized individual including a braincase, a series of eight neck vertebrae, a trunk vertebra, ribs, both scapulae, a coracoid, a left humerus and a left fibula.

A partial skeleton called "Skelett Y" (skeleton Y) was discovered in quarry "Y". On the basis of its scapula (shoulder blade) and humerus (upper arm bone) Brachiosaurus fraasi was erected, which later turned out to be a junior synonym of B. brancai. From quarry "D" came 23 vertebrae articulated with a sacrum (a hip bone), from quarry "Aa" another 18 vertebrae with a sacrum, from quarry "no" 50 articulated tail vertebrae, from GI 16 tail vertebrae and a number of limb bones, and much more material from other places, including many limb elements.

The quarries listed above represent only the most important sites where bones were found. In dozens of other Tendaguru locations, finds were made of large single sauropod bones that were referred to the taxon in Janensch's publications but of which no field notes survive so that the precise circumstances of the discoveries are unknown. Partly this reflects a lack of systematic documentation by the expedition. Many documents were destroyed by an allied bombardment in 1943. Part of the fossils were also lost. Nevertheless, most of the skeleton is known.

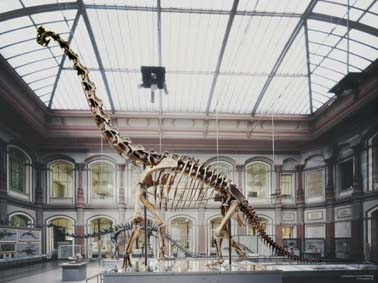
Mounted skeleton of Giraffatitan before it was remounted

Giraffatitan brancai was first named and described by German paleontologist Werner Janensch in 1914 as Brachiosaurus brancai, based on several specimens recovered between 1909 and 1912 from the Tendaguru formation. It is known from five partial skeletons, including three skulls and numerous fragmentary remains including skull material, some limb bones, vertebrae and teeth. It lived from 145 to 150 million years ago, during the Kimmeridgian to Tithonian ages of the Late Jurassic period. The lectotype material of Giraffatitan brancai is skeleton "Skelett SII", a partial skeleton from Tendaguru. It consists of skull fragments including dentaries, eleven cervical vertebrae, cervical ribs, seven dorsal vertebrae, nearly complete set of dorsal ribs, distal caudal vertebrae, chevrons, left scapula, both coracoids and sternal plates, right forelimb (except the humerus, which is probably from a referred specimen from quarry "Ni") and manus, left humerus, ulna and radius, both pubes, partial left femur, right tibia and fibula. "Skelett SI" is a paralectotype, and consists of a skull and six cervical (neck) vertebrae.

Originally, the Tedaguru "Skelett S" was thought by Janensch to stem from one animal, and to be very similar to the North American genus Brachiosaurus. Therefore, Janensch described it as Brachiosaurus brancai, choosing the species name in honor of Wilhelm von Branca, then director of the Museum für Naturkunde and a driving force behind the Tendaguru expedition. Later, Janensch realized that the remains pertained to two separate animals, "Skelett SI" (skeleton S1) and "Skelett SII" (skeleton S2) both of which belonged to the same species. Janensch did not designate either of the two as lectotype, and Taylor in 2009 selected the more complete "Skellet S II" as the lectotype.

A famous specimen of Giraffatitan brancai mounted in the Berlin's Natural History Museum is one of the largest, and in fact the tallest, mounted skeletons in the world, as certified by the Guinness Book of Records. Beginning in 1909, Werner Janensch found many additional G. brancai specimens in Tanzania, Africa, including some nearly complete skeletons, and used them to create the composite mounted skeleton seen today.

=== Separation from Brachiosaurus ===
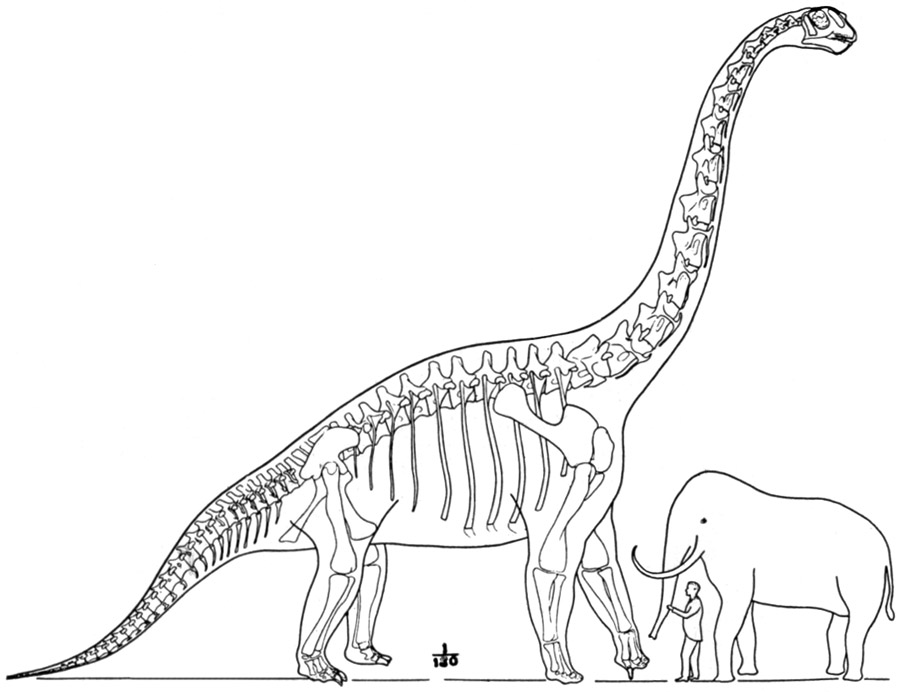
Diagram incorporating bones of both Brachiosaurus and Giraffatitan, by William Diller Matthew, 1915

In 1988 Gregory S. Paul published a new reconstruction of the skeleton of B. brancai, highlighting differences in proportion between it and B. altithorax. Chief among them was a distinction in the way the trunk vertebrae vary: they are fairly uniform in length in the African material, but vary widely in B. altithorax. Paul believed that the limb and girdle elements of both species were very similar, and therefore suggested they be separated not at genus, but only at subgenus level, as Brachiosaurus (Brachiosaurus) altithorax and Brachiosaurus (Giraffatitan) brancai. Giraffatitan was raised to full genus level by George Olshevsky in 1991, while referring to the vertebral variation. Between 1991 and 2009, the name Giraffatitan was almost completely disregarded by other researchers.

A detailed 2009 study by Taylor of all material, including the limb and girdle bones, found that there are significant divergences between B. altithorax and the Tendaguru material in all elements known from both species. Taylor found twenty-six distinct osteological (bone-based) characters, a larger difference than between Diplodocus and Barosaurus, and therefore argued that the African material should indeed be placed in its own genus (Giraffatitan) as Giraffatitan brancai. An important contrast between the two genera is their overall body shape, with Brachiosaurus having a 23 percent longer dorsal vertebral series and a 20 to 25 percent longer and also taller tail. The split was rejected by Daniel Chure in 2010, but from 2012 onward most studies recognized the name Giraffatitan.

== Description ==
=== Size ===
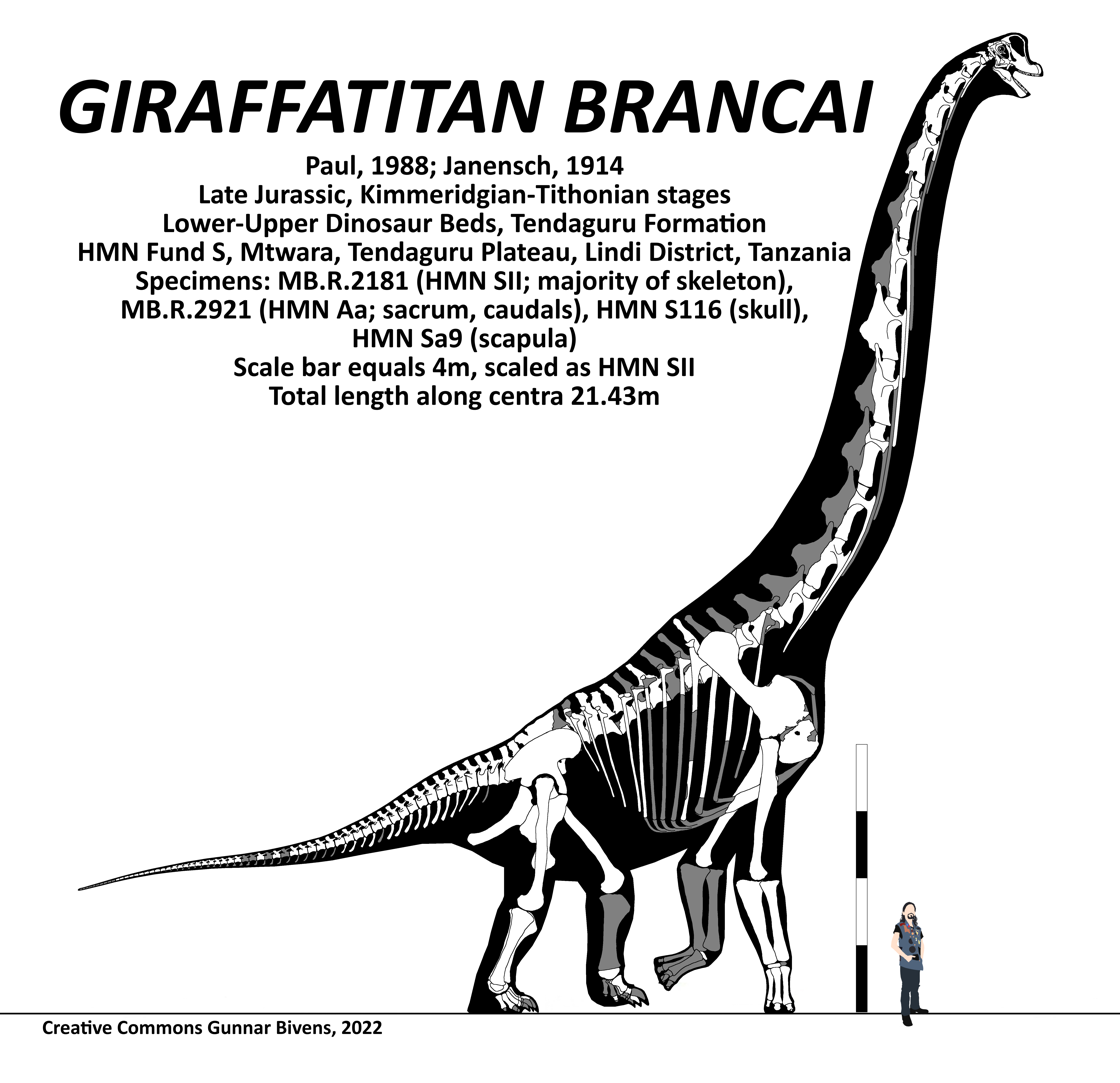
Fossil bones in the Giraffatitan Berlin composite skeletal specimen

Between 1914 and the 1990s, Giraffatitan was claimed to be the largest dinosaur known (ignoring the possibly larger but lost Maraapunisaurus) and thus the largest land animal in history. In the later part of the twentieth century, several giant titanosaurians found appear to surpass Giraffatitan in terms of sheer mass. However, Giraffatitan and Brachiosaurus are still the largest sauropods known from relatively complete material.

All size estimates for Giraffatitan are based on the skeleton mounted in Berlin, which is partly constructed from authentic bones. These were largely taken from specimen HMN SII, a subadult individual between 21.8–22.46 metres (71.5–73.7 ft) in length and about 12 metres (39 ft) tall. The often mentioned length of 22.46 m is by Werner Janensch, the German scientist who described Giraffatitan, and was the result of an adding error: the correct number should have been 22.16 m (72.7 ft). Mass estimates are more problematic and historically have strongly varied from as little as 15 tonnes (17 short tons) to as much as 78 tonnes (86 short tons). These extreme estimates are now considered unlikely due to flawed methodologies. There are also a large number of such estimations as the skeleton proved to be an irresistible subject for researchers wanting to test their new measuring methods. The first calculations were again made by Janensch. In 1935, he gave a volume of 32 m^{3} (1,100 cu ft) for specimen SII and of 25 m^{3} (880 cu ft) for specimen SI, a smaller individual. It is not known how he arrived at these numbers. In 1950, he mentioned a weight of forty tonnes for the larger skeleton. In 1962, Edwin Harris Colbert measured a volume of 86.953 m^{3} (3,070.7 cu ft). Presuming a density of 0.9, this resulted in a weight of 78,258 kg (172,529 lb). Colbert had inserted a museum model, sold to the public, into sand and observed the volume displaced by it. Gregory S. Paul in 1988 assumed that the, in his opinion, unrealistically high number had been caused by the fact that such models used to be very bloated compared to the real build of the animal. In 1980, Dale Alan Russell et al published a much lower weight of 14.8 tonnes by extrapolating from the diameter of the humerus and the thighbone. In 1985, the same researcher arrived at 29 tonnes by extrapolating from the circumference of these bones. In 1985, Robert McNeill Alexander found a value of 46.6 tonnes inserting a toy model of the British Museum of Natural History into water.

More recent estimates based on models reconstructed from bone volume measurements, which take into account the extensive, weight-reducing airsac systems present in sauropods, and estimated muscle mass, are in the range of 23.3–39.5 tonnes (25.7–43.5 short tons). In 1988, Gregory S. Paul measured a volume of 36.585 m^{3} by inserting a specially constructed model into water. He estimated a weight of 31.5 tonnes, assuming a low density. In 1994/1995 a weight of 40 tonnes extrapolating from limb bone circumference. In 1995 a laser scan of the skeleton was used to build a virtual model from simple geometrical shapes, finding a volume of 74.42 m^{3} (2,628 cu ft) and concluding to a weight of 63 metric tons (69 short tons). In 2008, Gunga revised the volume, using more complex shapes, to 47.9 m (157 ft). Donald Henderson in 2004 employed a computer model that calculated a volume of 32.398 m^{3} (1,144.1 cu ft) and a weight of 25,789 kg (56,855 lb; 25.789 t; 28.428 short tons) Newer methods use bone wall thickness.

However, HMN SII is not the largest specimen known (an assertion supported by its subadult status) but HMN XV2, represented by a fibula 13% larger than the corresponding material on HMN SII, which might have attained 26 m (85 ft) in length. Gregory S. Paul initially estimated the size of this specimen at 25 m (82 ft) in total length, 16 m (52 ft) in total height and 45 metric tons (50 short tons) in body mass, but later moderated at 23 m (75 ft) in total length and 40 metric tons (44 short tons) in body mass. In 2020, Molina-Perez and Larramnedi estimated the size of the HMN XV2 specimen at 25 m (82 ft) and 48 tonnes (53 short tons), with a shoulder height of 6.8 m (22 ft).

=== General build ===
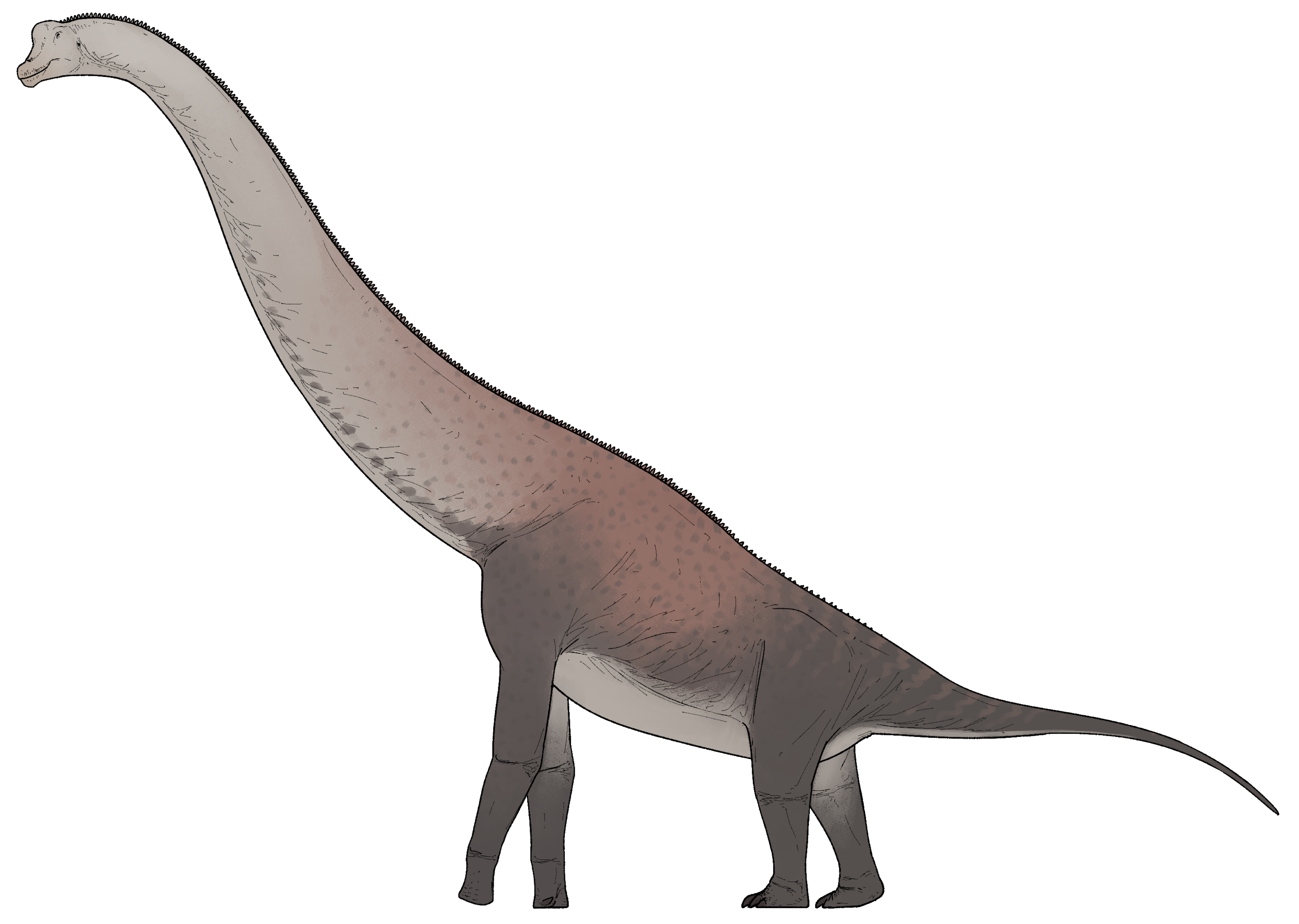
Life restoration of G. brancai.

Giraffatitan was a sauropod, one of a group of four-legged, plant-eating dinosaurs with long necks and tails. The estimated tail length makes up approximately 27.2% of the total body length. It had a giraffe-like build, with long forelimbs and a very long neck. The skull had a tall arch anterior to the eyes, consisting of the bony nares, a number of other openings, and "spatulate" teeth (resembling chisels). The first toe on its front foot and the first three toes on its hind feet were clawed.

=== Skull ===
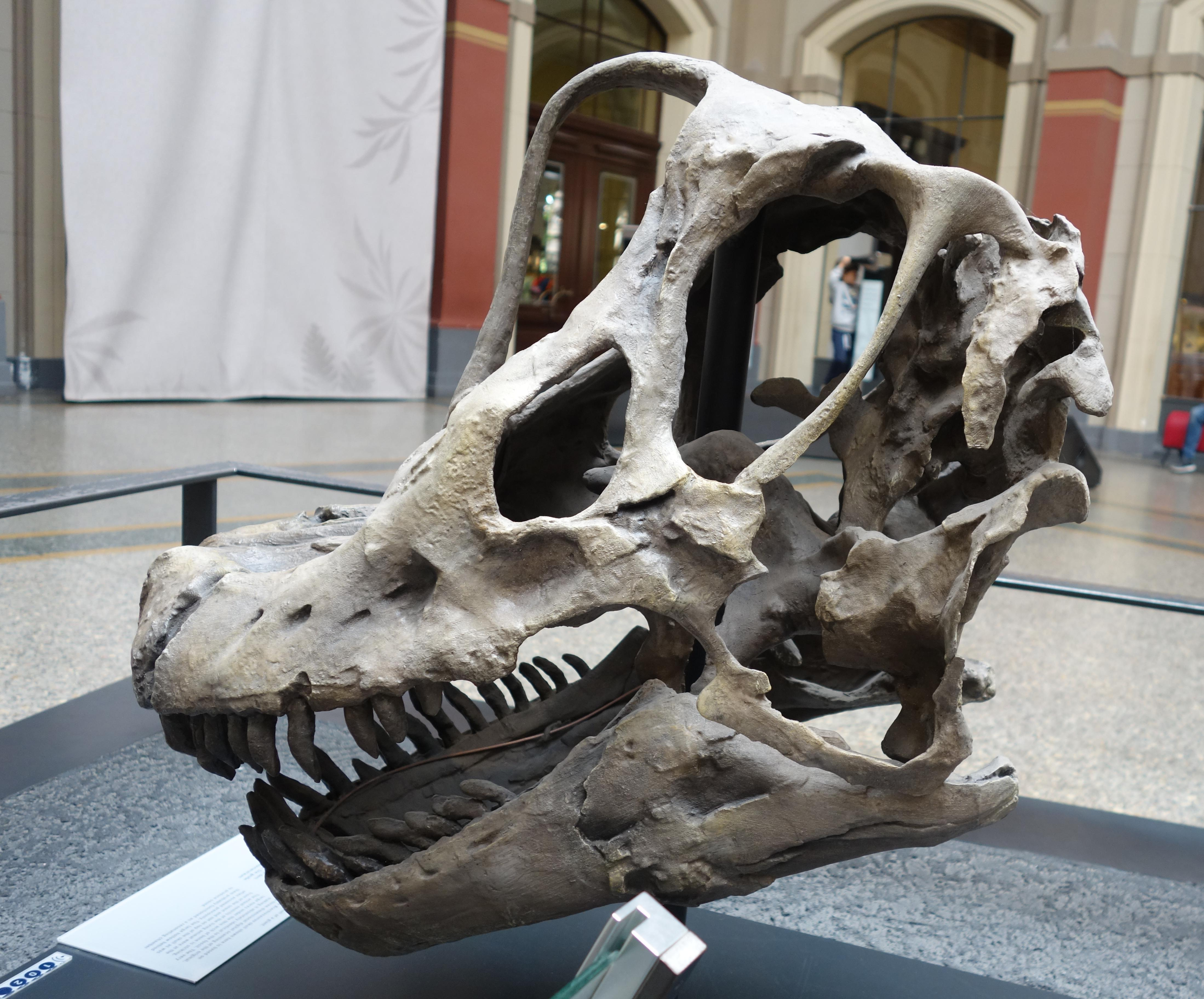
Skull cast in Berlin

Traditionally, the distinctive high-crested skull was seen as a characteristic of the genus Brachiosaurus, to which Giraffatitan brancai was originally referred; however, it is possible that Brachiosaurus altithorax did not show this feature, since within the traditional Brachiosaurus material it is known only from Tanzanian specimens now assigned to Giraffatitan.

The placement of Giraffatitan nostrils has been the source of much debate with Witmer (2001) describing in Science the hypothesized position of the fleshy nostrils in Giraffatitan in as many as five possible locations. Comparing the nares of dinosaurs with those of modern animals, he found that all species have their external nostril openings in the front, and that sauropods like Giraffatitan did not have nostrils on top of their heads, but near their snouts. There has also been the hypothesis of various sauropods, such as Giraffatitan, possessing a trunk. The fact that there were no narrow-snouted sauropods (Giraffatitan included) tends to discredit such a hypothesis. Stronger evidence for the absence of a trunk is found in the teeth wear of Giraffatitan, which shows the kind of wear that would result from biting and tearing off of plant matter rather than purely grinding, which would be the result of having already ripped the leaves and branches off with a trunk.

== Classification ==
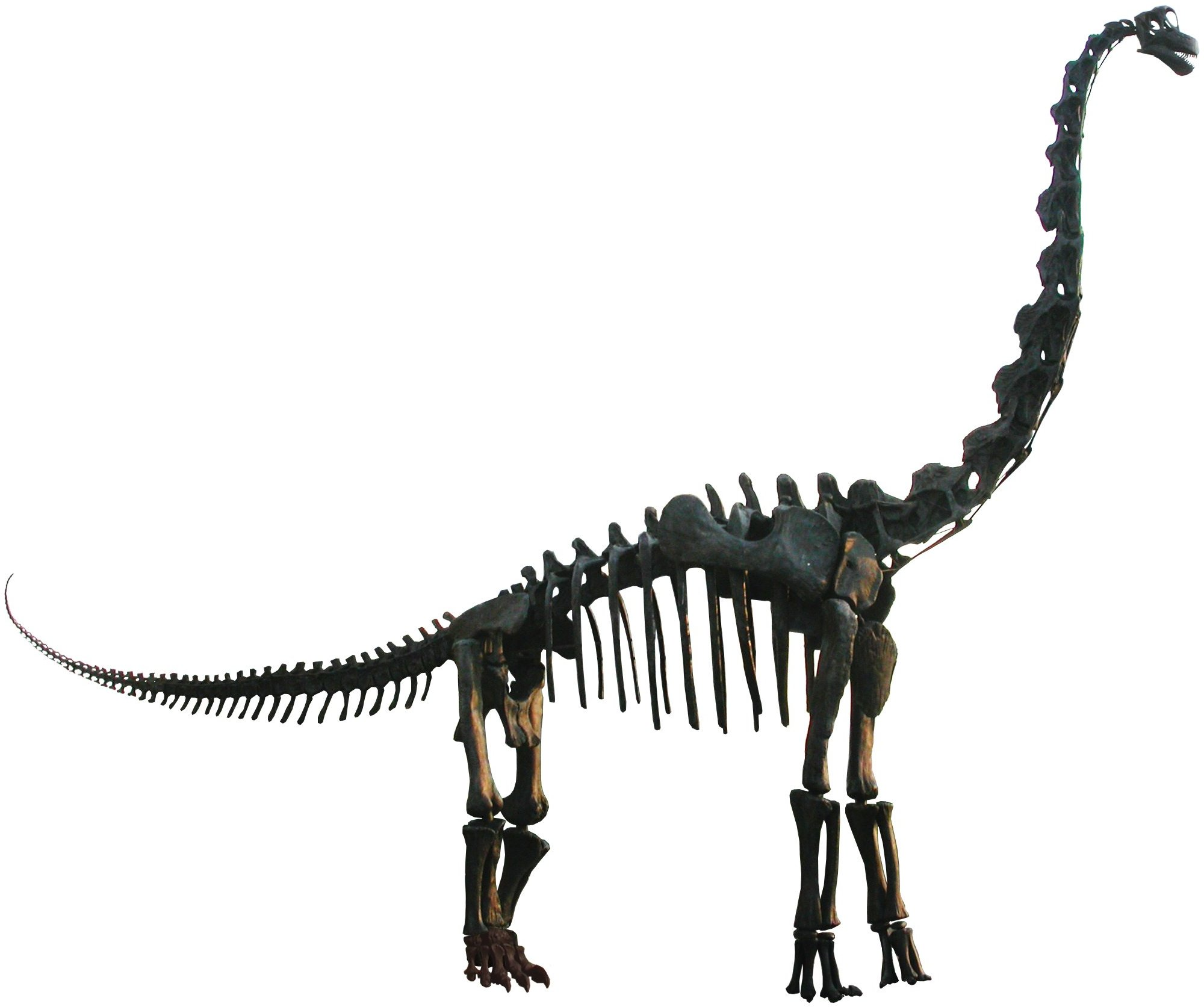
Reconstructed skeleton of the closely related Brachiosaurus

When describing Brachiosaurus brancai and B. fraasi in 1914, Janensch observed that the unique elongation of the humerus was shared by all three Brachiosaurus species as well as the British Pelorosaurus. He also noted this feature in Cetiosaurus, where it was not as strongly pronounced as in Brachiosaurus and Pelorosaurus. Janensch concluded that the four genera must have been closely related to each other, and in 1929 assigned them to a subfamily Brachiosaurinae within the family Bothrosauropodidae.

During the twentieth century, several sauropods were assigned to Brachiosauridae, including Astrodon, Bothriospondylus, Pelorosaurus, Pleurocoelus and Ultrasauros. These assignments were often based on broad similarities rather than unambiguous synapomorphies, shared new traits, and most of these genera are currently regarded as dubious. In 1969, in a study by R.F. Kingham, B. altithorax, B. brancai and B. atalaiensis, along with many species now assigned to other genera, were placed in the genus Astrodon, creating an Astrodon altithorax. Kingham's views of brachiosaurid taxonomy have not been accepted by many other authors. Since the 1990s, computer-based cladistic analyses allow for postulating detailed hypotheses on the relationships between species, by calculating those trees that require the fewest evolutionary changes and thus are the most likely to be correct. Such cladistic analyses have cast doubt on the validity of the Brachiosauridae. In 1993, Leonardo Salgado suggested that they were an unnatural group into which all kinds of unrelated sauropods had been combined. In 1997, he published an analysis in which species traditionally considered brachiosaurids were subsequent offshoots of the stem of a larger grouping, the Titanosauriformes, and not a separate branch of their own. This study also pointed out that B. altithorax and B. brancai did not have any synapomorphies, so that there was no evidence to assume they were particularly closely related.

Many cladistic analyses have since suggested that at least some genera can be assigned to the Brachiosauridae, and that this group is a basal branch within the Titanosauriformes. The exact status of each potential brachiosaurid varies from study to study. For example, a 2010 study by Chure and colleagues recognized Abydosaurus as a brachiosaurid together with Brachiosaurus, which in this study included B. brancai. In 2009, Taylor noted multiple anatomical differences between the two Brachiosaurus species, and consequently moved B. brancai into its own genus, Giraffatitan. In contrast to earlier studies, Taylor treated both genera as distinct units in a cladistic analysis, finding them to be sister groups. Another 2010 analysis focusing on possible Asian brachiosaurid material found a clade including Abydosaurus, Brachiosaurus, Cedarosaurus, Giraffatitan and Paluxysaurus, but not Qiaowanlong, the putative Asian brachiosaurid. Several subsequent analyses have found Brachiosaurus and Giraffatitan not to be sister groups, but instead located at different positions on the evolutionary tree. A 2012 study by D'Emic placed Giraffatitan in a more basal position, in an earlier branch, than Brachiosaurus, while a 2013 study by Philip Mannion and colleagues had it the other way around.

A 2012 study on titanosauriform sauropods by Michael D'Emic placed Giraffatitan as sister to a clade containing Brachiosaurus and a tritomy of Abydosaurus, Cedarosaurus and Venenosaurus as shown in the cladogram below:

- Brachiosauridae
  - Europasaurus
  - - Giraffatitan
    - - Brachiosaurus
      - - Abydosaurus
        - Cedarosaurus
        - Venenosaurus

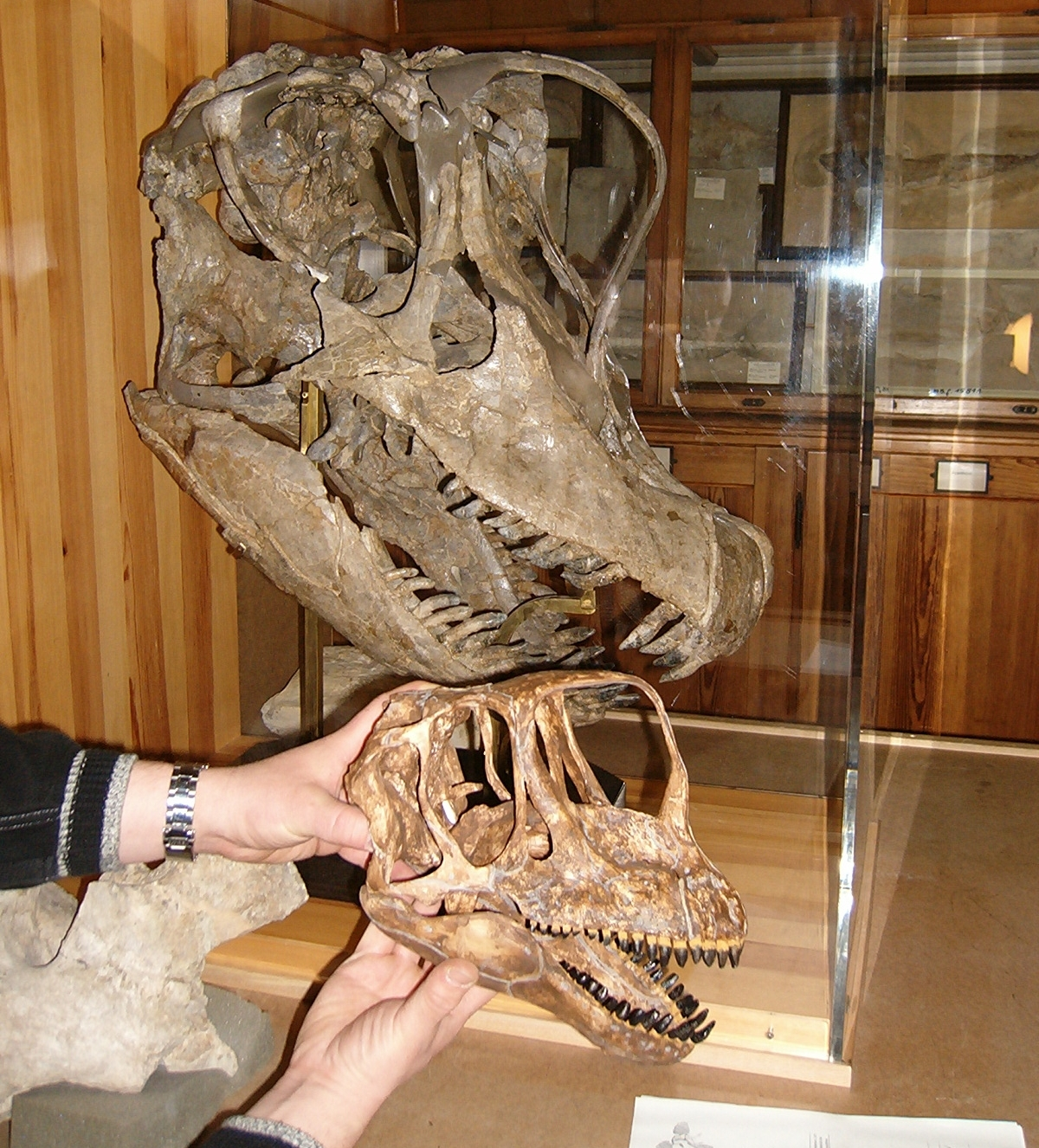
Authentic Giraffatitan skull (behind), compared to that of the small Europasaurus

In their 2024 description of Gandititan, Han et al. analyzed the phylogenetic relations of Macronaria, focusing on titanosauriform taxa. They recovered Giraffatitan as the sister taxon to Sonorasaurus, similar to some previous analyses, in a clade also containing Brachiosaurus. The results of their phylogenetic analyses are shown in the cladogram below:

- Macronaria
  - Atlasaurus
  - - Europasaurus
    - Galvesaurus
    - - Vouivria
      - - Lusotitan
        - - Fusuisaurus
          - Titanosauriformes
            - Somphospondyli
            - Brachiosauridae
              - - Brachiosaurus
                - - Giraffatitan
                  - Sonorasaurus
              - - Cedarosaurus
                - - Venenosaurus
                  - Soriatitan

== Paleobiology ==
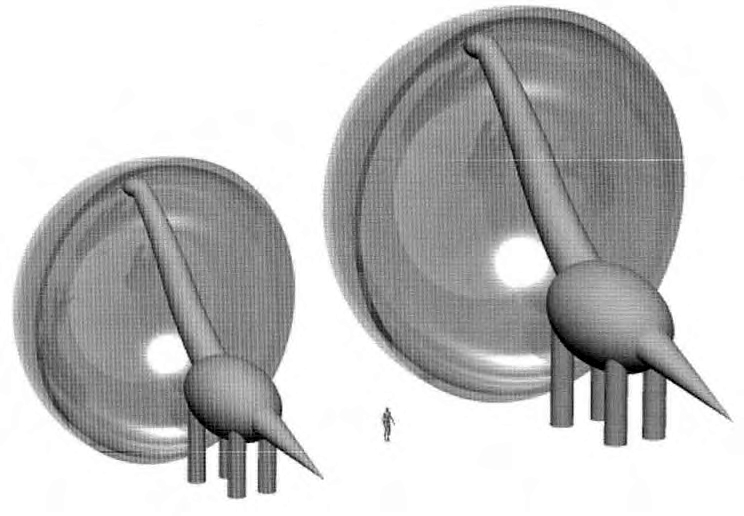
The feeding range of Giraffatitan (left) and Sauroposeidon

The nostrils of Giraffatitan, like the huge corresponding nasal openings in its skull, were long thought to be located on the top of the head. In past decades, scientists theorized that the animal used its nostrils like a snorkel, spending most of its time submerged in water in order to support its great mass. The current consensus view, however, is that Giraffatitan was a fully terrestrial animal. Studies have demonstrated that water pressure would have prevented the animal from breathing effectively while submerged and that its feet were too narrow for efficient aquatic use. Furthermore, new studies by Lawrence Witmer (2001) show that, while the nasal openings in the skull were placed high above the eyes, the nostrils would still have been close to the tip of the snout (a study which also lends support to the idea that the tall "crests" of brachiosaurs supported some sort of fleshy resonating chamber).

=== Brain ===
Giraffatitan's brain measured about 300 cm^{3} (18 cu in), which, like those of other sauropods, was small compared to its massive body size. A 2009 study calculated its Encephalization Quotient (a rough estimate of possible intelligence) at a low 0.62 or 0.79, depending on the size estimate used. Like other sauropods, Giraffatitan has a sacral enlargement above the hip which some older sources misleadingly referred to as a "second brain". However, glycogen bodies are a more likely explanation.

=== Nostril function ===
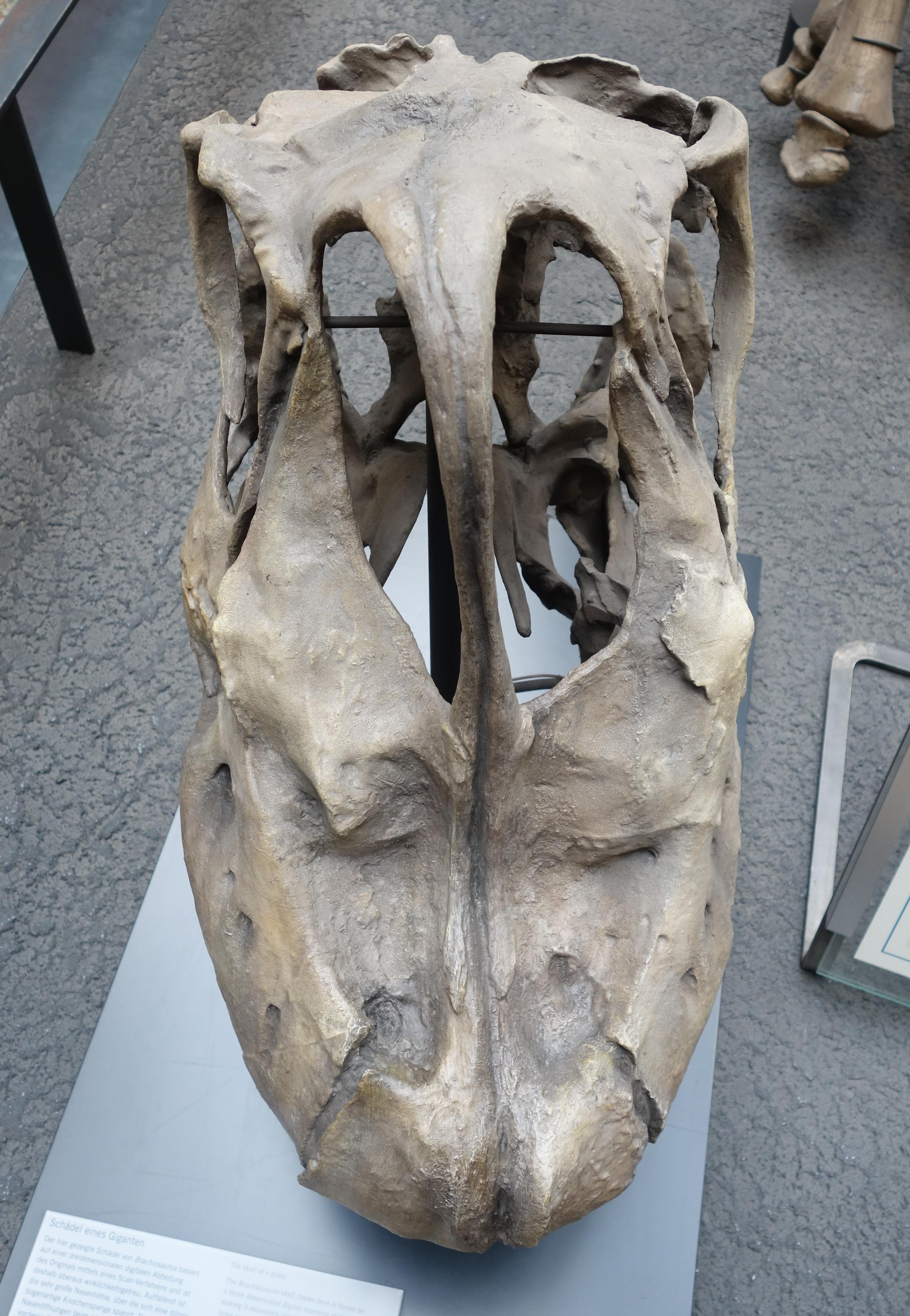
The fleshy external nostril would have been placed at the front of the nasal fossa, the depression seen in front of the bony nostril.

The bony nasal openings of neosauropods like Giraffatitan were large and placed on the top of their skulls. Traditionally, the fleshy nostrils of sauropods were thought to have been placed likewise on top of the head, roughly at the rear of the bony nostril opening, because these animals were erroneously thought to have been amphibious, using their large nasal openings as snorkels when submerged. The American paleontologist Lawrence M. Witmer rejected this reconstruction in 2001, pointing out that all living vertebrate land animals have their external fleshy nostrils placed at the front of the bony nostril. The fleshy nostrils of such sauropods would have been placed in an even more forward position, at the front of the narial fossa, the depression which extended far in front of the bony nostril toward the snout tip.

Czerkas speculated on the function of the peculiar brachiosaurid nose, and pointed out that there was no conclusive way to determine where the nostrils where located, unless a head with skin impressions was found. He suggested that the expanded nasal opening would have made room for tissue related to the animal's ability to smell, which would have helped smell proper vegetation. He also noted that in modern reptiles, the presence of bulbous, enlarged, and uplifted nasal bones can be correlated with fleshy horns and knobby protuberances, and that Brachiosaurus and other sauropods with large noses could have had ornamental nasal crests.

It has been proposed that sauropods, including Giraffatitan, may have had proboscises (trunks) based on the position of the bony narial orifice, to increase their upward reach. Fabien Knoll and colleagues disputed this for Diplodocus and Camarasaurus in 2006, finding that the opening for the facial nerve in the braincase was small. The facial nerve was thus not enlarged as in elephants, where it is involved in operating the sophisticated musculature of the proboscis. However, Knoll and colleagues also noted that the facial nerve for Giraffatitan was larger, and could therefore not discard the possibility of a proboscis in this genus.

=== Metabolism ===
If Giraffatitan was endothermic (warm-blooded), it would have taken an estimated ten years to reach full size; if it were instead poikilothermic (cold-blooded), then it would have required over 100 years to reach full size. As a warm-blooded animal, the daily energy demands of Giraffatitan would have been enormous; it would probably have needed to eat more than 182 kilograms (400 lb) of food per day. If Giraffatitan was fully cold-blooded or was a passive bulk endotherm, it would have needed far less food to meet its daily energy needs. Some scientists have proposed that large dinosaurs like Giraffatitan were gigantotherms. Internal organs of these giant sauropods were probably enormous.

=== Palaeoecology ===
In contrast to diplodocoids like Amargasaurus and Diplodocus, the small surface on the parietal bones of Giraffatitan for the insertion of the complexus and transversospinalis capitis muscles combined with the reduced paroccipital processes and rectus capitis lateralis muscles suggests Giraffatitan was a high browser that fed on foliage from the treetops, as its neck had a limited lateral range of motion and its head was positioned above the anterior cervical vertebrae.

== Paleoenvironment ==
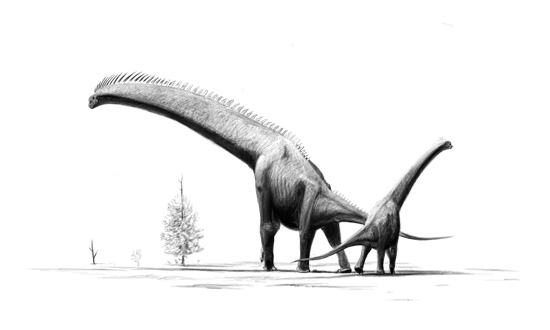
Restoration of two individuals

Giraffatitan lived in what is now Tanzania in the Late Jurassic Tendaguru Formation. Since 2012, the boundary between the Kimmeridgian and Tithonian is dated at 152.1 million years ago.

The Tendaguru ecosystem primarily consisted of three types of environment: shallow, lagoon-like marine environments, tidal flats and low coastal environments; and vegetated inland environments. The marine environment existed above the fair weather wave base and behind siliciclastic and ooid barriers. It appeared to have had little change in salinity levels and experienced tides and storms. The coastal environments consisted of brackish coastal lakes, ponds and pools. These environments had little vegetation and were probably visited by herbivorous dinosaurs mostly during droughts. The well vegetated inlands were dominated by conifers. Overall, the Late Jurassic Tendaguru climate was subtropical to tropical with seasonal rains and pronounced dry periods. During the Early Cretaceous, the Tendaguru became more humid. The Tendaguru Beds are similar to the Morrison Formation of North America except in its marine interbeds.

Giraffatitan would have coexisted with fellow sauropods like Dicraeosaurus hansemanni and D. sattleri, Janenschia robusta, Tendaguria tanzaniensis and Tornieria africanus; ornithischians like Dysalotosaurus lettowvorbecki and Kentrosaurus aethiopicus; the theropods "Allosaurus" tendagurensis, "Ceratosaurus" roechlingi, "Ceratosaurus" ingens, Elaphrosaurus bambergi, Veterupristisaurus milneri and Ostafrikasaurus crassiserratus; and the pterosaur Tendaguripterus recki. Other organisms that inhabited the Tendaguru included corals, echinoderms, cephalopods, bivalves, gastropods, decapods, sharks, neopterygian fish, crocodilians and small mammals like Brancatherulum tendagurensis.

== See also ==
- List of African dinosaurs
- Dinosaurs of Tendaguru
- Brachiosauridae
- Sauropoda
- Sauropodomorpha

== Bibliography ==
- Maier, Gerhard. 2003. African dinosaurs unearthed: the Tendaguru expeditions. Life of the Past Series (ed. J. Farlow). Indiana University Press, Bloomington, Indiana
