= Jessica Hennig =

German politician (born 1988)

Member of the Hamburg Parliament
- Incumbent
- Assumed office 26 March 2025

Personal details
- Born: 9 December 1988 (age 37)
- Party: Social Democratic Party (since 2021)

Jessica Hennig (born 9 December 1988) is a German politician serving as a member of the Hamburg Parliament since 2025. From 2024 to 2025, she was a borough councillor of Wandsbek.
