= Oloff Hennig =

South African businessman

Oloff Hennig is a South African businessman, best known for his friendship with Ronnie Biggs, the legendary British train robber. He was also embroiled in a tax and murder scandal following the death of his accountant.

Oloff is also reputed to have paved the way for South Africa's rugby legend Naas Botha’s try-out as goal kicker for the Dallas Cowboys.

== Tax investigation ==
Hennig was embroiled in a tax and murder scandal when his accountant Marius van der Westhuizen was convicted of fraud. Van der Westhuizen was charged with filing false tax returns and fictitious figures on behalf of Oloff Hennig's companies.

Van der Westhuizen subsequently committed suicide before a sentencing for his crimes.

== Links to Ronnie Biggs ==
Oloff Hennig was also a close friend of legendary British train robber Ronnie Biggs. Oloff visited him many times whilst Biggs lived in exile in Rio de Janeiro. Oloff even arranged for South African tourists to meet Biggs in Rio, where he would tell them how his gang conducted the Great Train Robbery (1963), during which they stole £2.6 million.

== Personal life ==
Oloff is the father of Walter Hennig.
