= Edwin Hennig =

German paleontologist

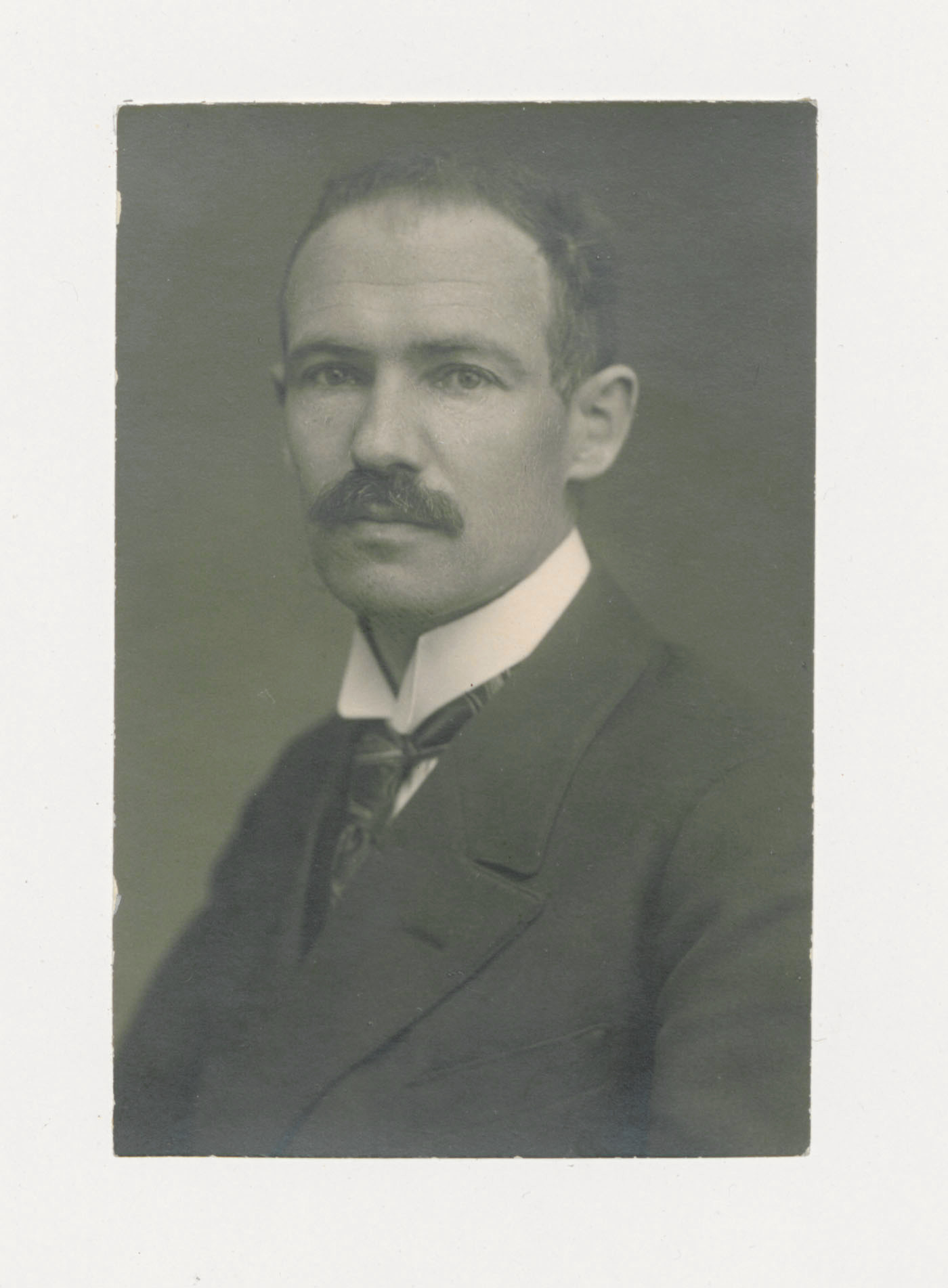
- Edwin Hennig
- Born: 27 April 1882; Berlin, Germany
- Died: 12 November 1977 (aged 95); Tübingen, Germany
- Occupation: Paleontologist

Edwin Hennig (27 April 1882 – 12 November 1977) was a German paleontologist.

== Career ==
Edwin Hennig was one of five children of a merchant who died when Hennig was 10 years old. Starting in 1902, Hennig studied natural sciences, anthropology, and philosophy at the University of Freiburg in Freiburg im Breisgau, Baden-Württemberg, Germany where earned a doctorate in 1906 with Otto Jaekel. During this time Hennig significantly contributed to research on the extinct genus Gyrodus.

Afterwards, he was an assistant to Wilhelm von Branca at Berlin's Friedrich-Wilhelms-Universität, where he attained his habilitation and became a private lecturer.

During World War I, he was a military geologist until 1917 where he became a professor at the University of Tübingen and later an academic rector and director of the geological paleontology institute. Hennig later joined the National Socialist German Workers' Party in 1937. In 1945, he was relieved of office and submitted to denazification. Hennig retired in 1951.

Edwin Hennig is well known for joining expeditions with Werner Janensch to the Tendaguru Beds in what is now Tanzania, East Africa. He is also known for describing discoveries of Australopithecus afarensis from East Africa, collected by Ludwig Kohl-Larsen.

Much like Othenio Abel, Hennig was a supporter of orthogenesis theories of evolution as was his assistant, Karl Beurlen.

== Publications ==
- Gyrodus und die organisation der pyknodonten (E. Naegele, 1906)
- Erdbebenkunde Eine Übersicht über den gegenwärtigen Stand der Erdbeben Forschung, die wichtigsten Erdbeben-Hypothesen und den internationalen Erdbeben-Beobachtungsdienst(J. A. Barth, 1909)
- Am Tendaguru; leben und wirken einer deutschen forschungs - expedition zur ausgrabung vorweltlicher riesensaurier in Deutsch Ostafrika (E. Schweizerbart'sche verlagsbuchhandlung, 1912)
- Stegosauria(W. Junk, 1915)
- Geologie von Württemberg nebst Hohenzollern (Gebrüder Borntraeger, 1923)
- Der mittlere Jura im hinterlande von Daressalaam (Deutsch-Ostafrika); beiträge zur geologie und stratigraphie Deutsch-Ostafrikas III (1924)

== See also ==
- Kentrosaurus
