= Werner Janensch =

German paleontologist and geologist (1878–1969)

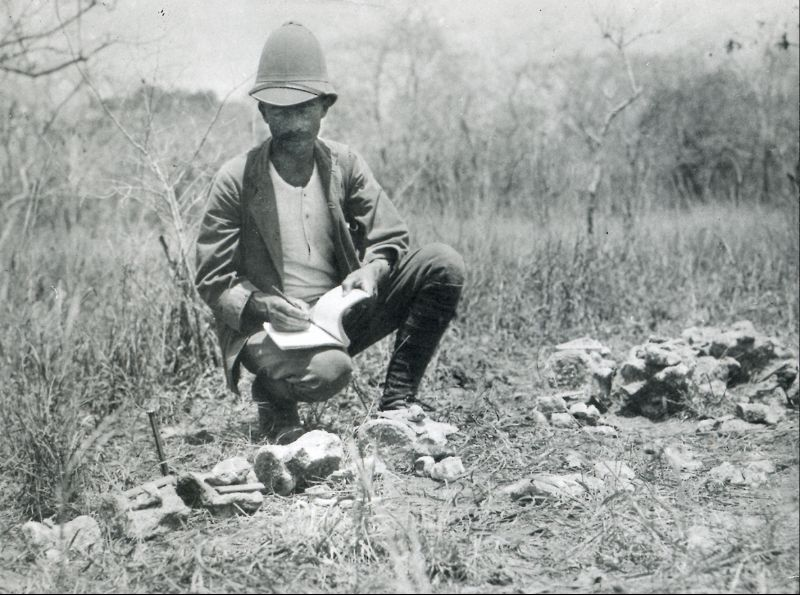
Janensch during the Tendaguru expedition.

Werner Ernst Martin Janensch (11 November 1878 – 20 October 1969) was a German paleontologist and geologist.

== Biography ==
Janensch was born at Herzberg (Elster).

In addition to Friedrich von Huene, Janensch was probably Germany's most important dinosaur specialist from the early and middle twentieth century. His most famous and significant contributions stemmed from the expedition undertaken to the Tendaguru Beds in what is now Tanzania. As leader of an expedition (together with Edwin Hennig) set up by the Museum für Naturkunde in Berlin, where he worked as a curator, Janensch helped uncover an enormous quantity of fossils of late Jurassic period dinosaurs, including several complete Brachiosaurus skeletons, then the largest animal ever known. During his long subsequent career (he worked in Berlin from 1914 to 1961), Janensch named several new dinosaur taxa including Dicraeosaurus (1914) and Elaphrosaurus (1920). Janensch's Brachiosaurus were later determined to belong to a distinct, related genus, Giraffatitan.

His work at Tendaguru earned him several awards. The Prussian Academy of Sciences honored him with the silver Leibniz Medal in 1911. A year later, he was appointed Professor in geology and paleontology at the Friedrich-Wilhelms-Universität in Berlin. In 1913, he became a member, and in 1958 an honorary member, of the Paläontologische Gesellschaft.

In 1920 he married Paula Henneberg, daughter of the mathematician Ernst Lebrecht Henneberg; they had no children.

He died in 1969 at Berlin and was buried in Waldfriedhof Dahlem in that city.

== Publications ==
Die Jurensisschichten des Elsass (1902)

== Sources ==
- Giant Leap for Paleontology Guardian Unlimited.
- Paleontologists - AllAboutDinosaurs.com
- Maier, G. African dinosaurs unearthed : the Tendaguru expeditions. Bloomington, Indiana : Indiana University Press, 2003. (Life of the Past Series).
