= Reptile (disambiguation) =

A reptile is a tetrapod vertebrate of the taxonomic class Reptilia, including crocodilians, snakes, lizards and turtles.

Reptile or Reptilia may also refer to:

- The Reptile, a 1966 film directed by John Gilling
- Reptile (Mortal Kombat), a fictional character from the Mortal Kombat video game series
- Reptiles (M. C. Escher), a lithograph print by M. C. Escher
- Reptiles (magazine), a pet-hobby magazine
- Reptilia (manga), a Japanese horror manga
- Reptile (software), a web syndication program
- Reptilia (zoo), a Canadian reptile zoo
- Reptilia, a novel by Thomas Thiemeyer
- Reptile (film), a 2023 film directed by Grant Singer

In music:

- Raptile, German-American rapper
- Reptile (band) (Risaeðlan), an Icelandic band
- Reptile (album), an album by Eric Clapton
- "Reptile" (song), a song by The Church
- "Reptilia" (song), a song by The Strokes
- "Reptile", a song by Dimmu Borgir from Spiritual Black Dimensions
- "Reptile", a song by Nine Inch Nails from The Downward Spiral
- "Reptile", a song by Skrillex from Mortal Kombat: Songs Inspired by the Warriors
- "Reptile", a song by Periphery from Periphery IV: Hail Stan
- "Reptiles", a song by supergroup Them Crooked Vultures' eponymous album

== See also ==
- Reptil, a fictional character in the Marvel Comics universe
- Rep-tile, a term for self-replicating tilings.
- Reptilian (disambiguation)
