= The Danish Woman =

2026 Icelandic-French television miniseries

- Danska Konan
- Genre: Drama, Black comedy
- Created by: Benedikt Erlingsson; Ólafur Egill Egilsson
- Written by: Benedikt Erlingsson; Ólafur Egill Egilsson
- Starring: Trine Dyrholm; Hilmar Guðjónsson; Kristín Þóra Haraldsdóttir; Halldóra Geirharðsdóttir
- Composer: Matti Kallio
- Countries of origin: Iceland, France
- Original languages: Icelandic, Danish, English
- No. of episodes: 6

Production
- Running time: 47 minutes
- Production companies: Slot Machine; Gullslottid; Zik Zak Filmworks

Original release
- Network: RÚV; ZDF/Arte; DR; YLE; SVT

The Danish Woman (Icelandic: Danska konan) is an Icelandic-French television miniseries created by Benedikt Erlingsson. Co-written by Benedikt and Ólafur Egill Egilsson. The six-episode series premiered at the Series Mania festival in March 2025 and received critical acclaim from international media including Variety, Le Monde, and Le Figaro.

It follows Ditte Jensen, a retired Danish intelligence officer who relocates to Reykjavík, where her instincts as an elite operative and her strong sense of justice lead her to intervene in the lives of her neighbors, blurring the line between heroism and intrusion.

== Plot ==
The series follows Ditte Jensen, a retired Danish intelligence officer who moves to an apartment building in Reykjavík, intending to live anonymously and tend to her garden. However, her background as an elite operative and her strong sense of justice lead her to become involved in the lives of her neighbors. She uses her skills to intervene in various situations and conflicts within the building community, believing that the ends justify the means in her pursuit of helping others, whether they welcome her assistance or not. Her neighbours include an alcoholic, a domestic violence victim and refugees facing deportation. However, her interventions backfire in the final episode: she came to the assistance of a neighbour who was in debt to drug dealer, but finds he (46 years old) had impregnated a teenage girl, and then the antagonised drug dealer (who was also a former spy) plants drugs in her bathroom, resulting in a visit from armed police.

== Cast ==
- Trine Dyrholm as Ditte Jensen
- Hilmar Guðjónsson as Þórir
- Kristín Þóra Haraldsdóttir as Gulla
- Natalía Kristín Karlsdóttir as Maríanna
- Baldur Björn Arnarsson as Kári
- Hrafn Alexis Elíasson Blöndal as Finnur
- Halldóra Geirharðsdóttir as Soffía
- Hjálmar Hjálmarsson as Kristinn
- Edda Guðnadóttir as Björk
- Björn Thors as Magnús
- Kolbrún Helga Fridriksdóttir as Maja
- Halla Vilhjálmsdóttir as Ástríður
- Atli Rafn Sigurðsson as Skarphéðinn
- Raffaella Brizuela Sigurdardóttir as Salima
- Juan Camilo Román Estrada as Juan Camillo
- Jens Albinus as Jens Jørgensen
- Thorvaldur Strømberg as Ingmar Strömberg
- Besir Zeciri as Kasper
- Siff Vintersol as Mille
- Andreas Jebro as Ole
- Sebastian Alstrup as Joakim
- Marina Bouras as Danish ambassador
- Benedikt Erlingsson as Balding thug
- Ólafur Egill Egilsson as Leather Óli

== Production ==
The series was created by Benedikt Erlingsson. Co-written by Benedikt and Ólafur Egill Egilsson. Benedikt is an acclaimed Icelandic filmmaker whose previous works include Of Horses and Men (2013), which won the Kutxa-New Directors Award at the San Sebastián International Film Festival, and Woman at War (2018). Woman at War (Icelandic: Kona fer í stríð, lit. 'Woman goes to battle') received multiple international awards including the LUX Prize from the European Parliament, the SACD Award at Cannes' Critics' Week, the Nordic Council Film Prize, and ten Edda Awards.

Co-creator and writer Ólafur Egill Egilsson previously worked on the Icelandic crime series Trapped, Katla, The Oath, and Woman at War.

The series was produced by Slot Machine (France) in coproduction with Gullslottid and Zik Zak Filmworks (Iceland). Producers Marianne Slot and Carine Leblanc developed and produced the series through Slot Machine, a Paris-based production company founded by Marianne Slot in 1993. The company has produced works by international filmmakers including Lars von Trier, Lucrecia Martel, Bent Hamer, Małgorzata Szumowska, Paz Encina, Lisandro Alonso, Emma Dante, Marian Crisan, Juliette Garcia, Yeşim Ustaoğlu, Sergei Loznitsa, and Naomi Kawase.

Production involved collaboration with broadcasters RÚV, ZDF/Arte, DR, Yle, and SVT. Filming took place in Iceland over 54 days.

=== Music ===
The series' soundtrack was composed and arranged by Matti Kallio, and performed by Kallio, Andre Ferrari, Pekko Käppi, and Maija Kauhanen. Trine Dyrholm performs multiple songs throughout the series, including "Glor på vinduer", "Nattog", and "Smuk og Dejlig" by Anne Linnet; "Human Behaviour" by Björk; "Vilde Kaniner" by Gnags; "Euphoria" by Thomas G:son and Peter Boström; Svefnpurkur by Purrkur Pillnikk; "Smuk som et Stjerneskud" by Jørgen Olsen; "Buster" by Nanna Lüders Jensen; "Sísí fríkar út" by Grýlurnar; and "Trommuþrællinn" by Steinunn Harðardóttir.

The soundtrack was released by Crunchy Frog Soundtracks, a soundtrack sublabel of Crunchy Frog Records.

== Release and reception ==
The series had its world premiere at Series Mania in Lille, France, in March 2025, where the first two episodes were screened as part of the International Panorama Section. It was subsequently presented at the Transilvania International Film Festival in Cluj-Napoca, Romania, and at Seriencamp in Cologne, Germany.

The series is scheduled for broadcast in 2026 on RÚV (Iceland), ZDF/Arte (Germany/France), DR (Denmark), Yle (Finland), and SVT (Sweden). In Australia, it is available on SBS on Demand as of 19 February 2026.

=== Critical reception ===
The series received positive reviews following its festival screenings. Cineuropa described it as "jubilant", while Le Figaro called it "a marvel of Nordic black comedy". Le Monde praised Trine Dyrholm's performance as "extraordinary".

Variety highlighted the series' originality and dark humor in its coverage of the Series Mania premiere. Drama Quarterly noted the series' unique approach to storytelling and character development. Der Spiegel notes: "Anyone who has a neighbor like her doesn't need an army."
