= Tendaguru Formation =

Geological formation and paleontological site in Tanzania

- Stratigraphic range: ?Callovian-Hauterivian; ~165–130 Ma
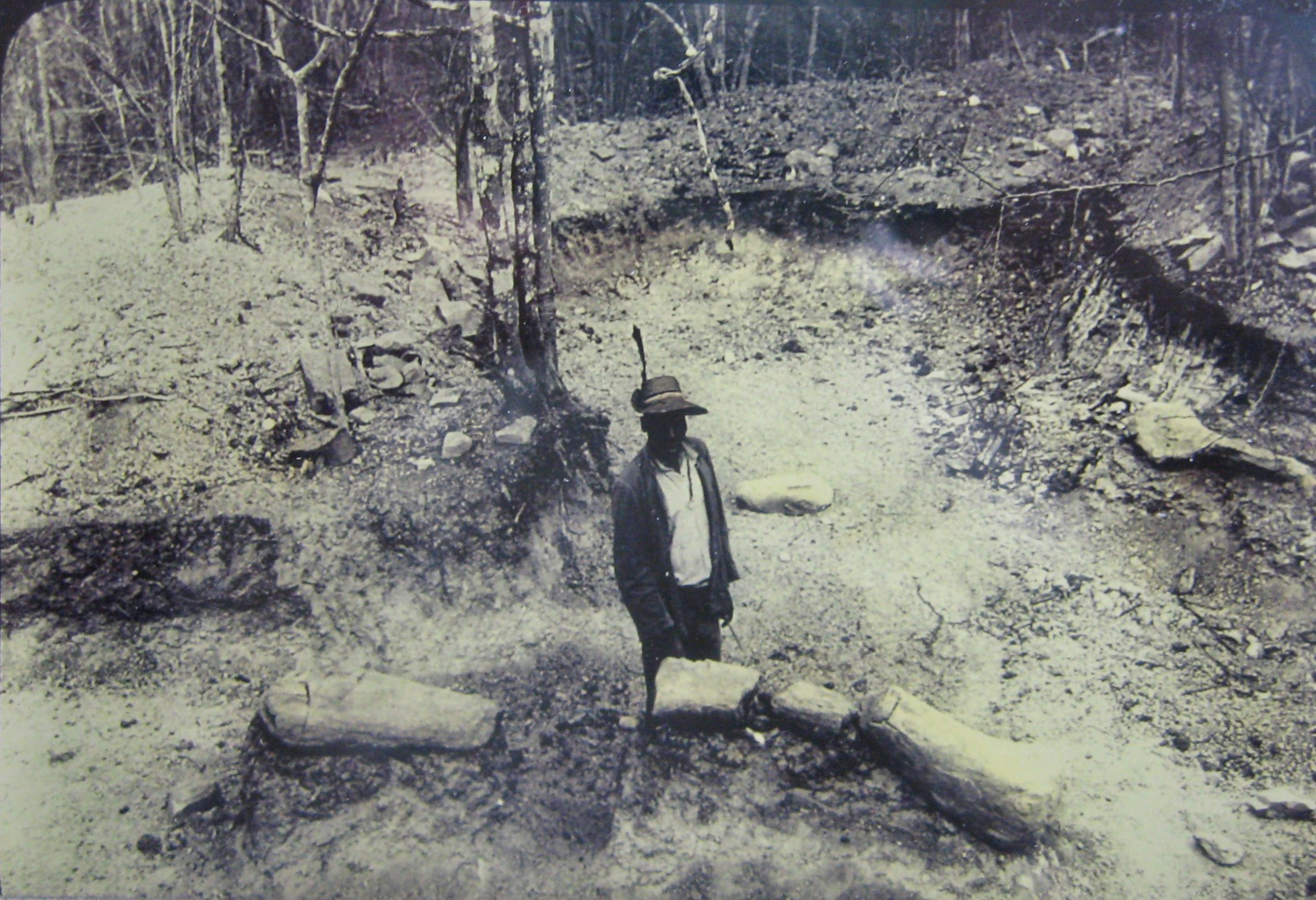
- Type: Geological formation
- Sub-units: See text
- Underlies: Makonde Formation
- Overlies: Neoproterozoic gneiss basement
- Thickness: >110 m (360 ft)

Lithology
- Primary: Sandstone
- Other: Shale, siltstone, clay, conglomerate, limestone

Location
- Coordinates: 9.7°S 39.2°E
- Approximate paleocoordinates: 29.4°S 16.7°E
- Region: Lindi Region
- Country: Tanzania
- Extent: Mandawa Basin

Type section
- Named for: Tendaguru Hill
- Named by: Janensch & Hennig
- Year defined: 1914
- Tendaguru Formation (Tanzania)

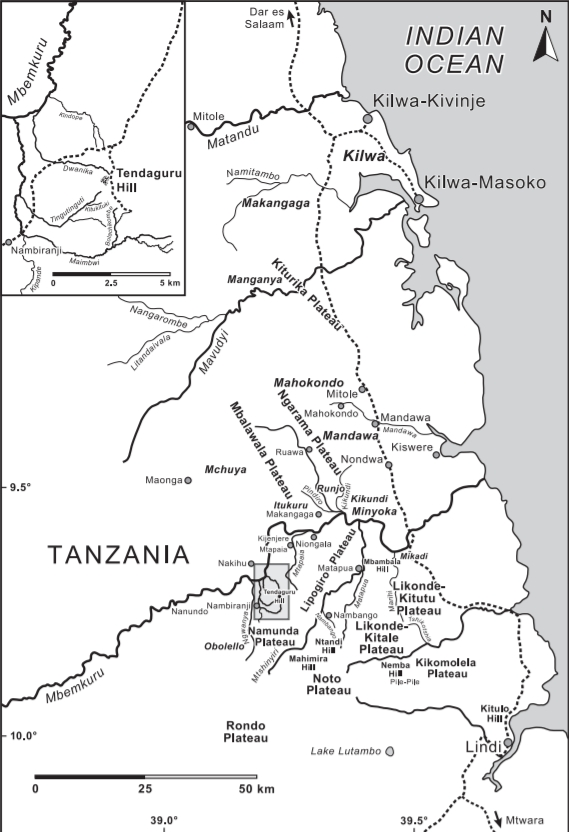
Location of Tendaguru in Tanzania

The Tendaguru Formation, or Tendaguru Beds are a highly fossiliferous formation and Lagerstätte located in the Lindi Region of southeastern Tanzania. The formation represents the oldest sedimentary unit of the Mandawa Basin, overlying Neoproterozoic basement, separated by a long hiatus and unconformity. It reaches a total sedimentary thickness of more than 110 metres (360 ft). The formation ranges in age from the late Middle Jurassic to the Early Cretaceous, Oxfordian to Hauterivian stages, with the base of the formation possibly extending into the Callovian.

The Tendaguru Formation is subdivided into six members; these are from oldest to youngest the Lower Dinosaur Member, the Nerinella Member, the Middle Dinosaur Member, the Indotrigonia africana Member, the Upper Dinosaur Member, and the Rutitrigonia bornhardti-schwarzi member. The succession comprises a sequence of sandstones, shales, siltstones, conglomerates with minor oolitic limestones, deposited in an overall shallow marine to coastal plain environment, characterized by tidal, fluvial and lacustrine influence with a tsunami deposit occurring in the Indotrigonia africana member. The climate of the Late Jurassic and Early Cretaceous was semi-arid with seasonal rainfall and the eustatic sea level was rising in the Late Jurassic from low levels in the Middle Jurassic. Paleogeographical reconstructions show the Tendaguru area was located in the subtropical southern hemisphere during the Late Jurassic.

The Tendaguru Formation is considered the richest Late Jurassic strata in Africa. The formation has provided a wealth of fossils of different groups; early mammaliaforms, several genera of dinosaurs, crocodyliforms, amphibians, fish, invertebrates and flora. More than 250 tonnes (250 long tons; 280 short tons) of material were shipped to Germany during excavations in the early 20th century. The faunal assemblage of the Tendaguru is similar to the Morrison Formation of the central-western United States, with an additional marine interbed fauna not present in the Morrison.

The dinosaur fauna found in the formation is similar to that of other highly fossiliferous stratigraphic units of the Late Jurassic; among others the Kimmeridge and Oxford Clays of England, the Sables de Glos, Argiles d'Octeville, Marnes de Bléville of France, the Alcobaça, Guimarota and Lourinhã Formations of Portugal, the Villar del Arzobispo Formation of Spain, the Shishugou, Kalazha and Shangshaximiao Formations in China, the Toqui Formation of Chile and Cañadón Calcáreo Formation and the Morrison Formation, with the presence of dinosaurs with similar counterparts, e.g., Brachiosaurus and Stegosaurus in the Morrison, and Giraffatitan and Kentrosaurus in the Tendaguru.

== Description ==
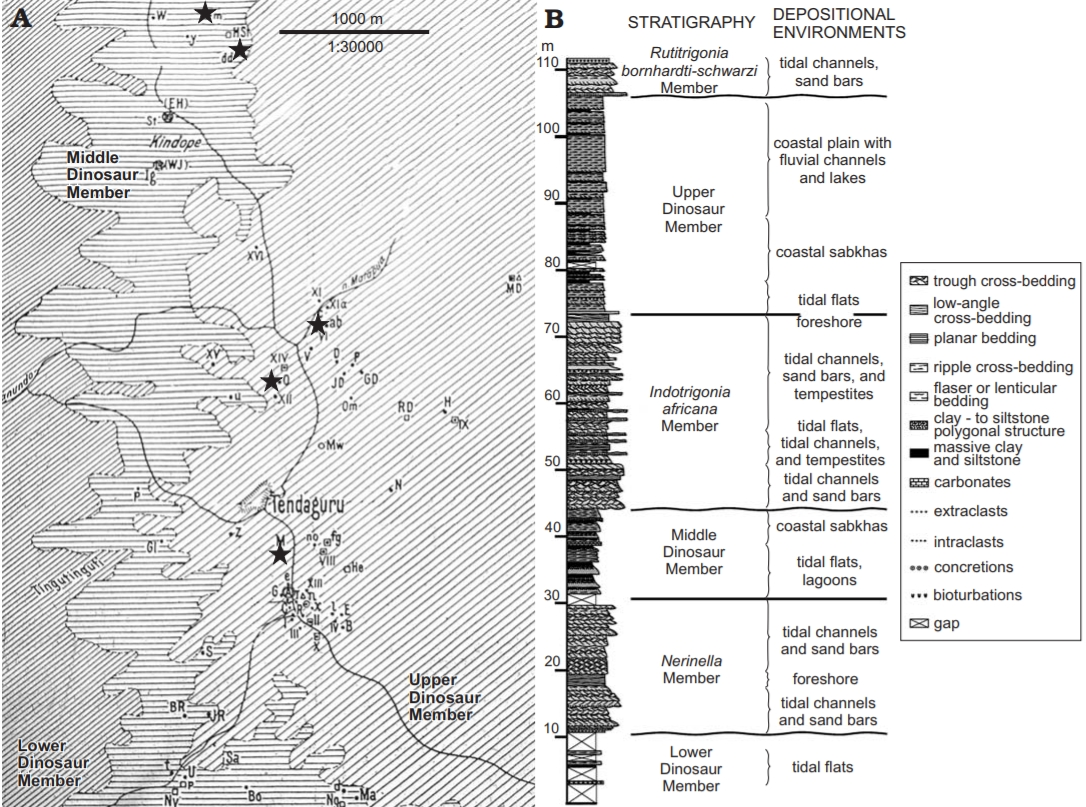
Map and stratigraphic column of the Tendaguru Formation

The Tendaguru Formation represents the oldest sedimentary unit in the Mandawa Basin, directly overlying Neoproterozoic basement consisting of gneiss. The contact contains a large hiatus, a missing sequence of stratigraphy, spanning the Paleozoic, Triassic and Early Jurassic. The formation is unconformably overlaid by late Early Cretaceous sediments of the Makonde Formation that forms the top of several plateaus; Namunda, Rondo, Noto, and Likonde-Kitale.

Based on extended geological and paleontological observations, the "Tendaguruschichten" (Tendaguru Beds) were defined by Werner Janensch as expedition leader and Edwin Hennig in 1914 referring to a sequence of Late Jurassic to Early Cretaceous strata, exposed in the Tendaguru area, which is named after the Tendaguru Hill.

=== Stratigraphy ===
The Tendaguru is divided into 6 members, which represent different depositional environments, with the 'Dinosaur Beds' representing terrestrial facies while the beds with genus/species names represent marine interbeds with shallow marine to lagoonal facies. In ascending order these are: the Lower Dinosaur Member, the Nerinella Member, the Middle Dinosaur Member, Indotrigonia africana Member, the Upper Dinosaur Member, and the Rutitrigonia bornhardti-schwarzi Member. The units of the Tendaguru are known to interfinger with each other.

Stratigraphy of the Tendaguru Formation
Formation	Time period	Member	Lithology	Thickness	Image
Makonde	Early Albian; Aptian		Fine to medium grained sandstones, intercalated conglomerates, siltstones and claystones	~200 m (660 ft)	
	Barremian	Unconformity			
Tendaguru	Hauterivian; Valanginian	Rutitrigonia bornhardti-schwarzi	Fine to medium grained sandstones with basal conglomerate	5–70 m (16–230 ft)	
Tendaguru	Berriasian	Unconformity			
Tendaguru	Tithonian	Upper Dinosaur	Ripple cross bedded fine grained sandstones and siltstones with intercalated claystone and micritic carbonates	~32 m (105 ft)	
Tendaguru	Tithonian	Indotrigonia africana	Calcite cemented sandstones, conglomerate beds, thin clay and silt layers with sandy limestones	20–50 m (66–164 ft)	
Tendaguru	Late Kimmeridgian	Indotrigonia africana	Calcite cemented sandstones, conglomerate beds, thin clay and silt layers with sandy limestones	20–50 m (66–164 ft)	
Tendaguru	Late Kimmeridgian	Middle Dinosaur	Ripple cross bedded fine grained calcareous sandstones and siltstones and massive to crudely bedded silt and claystones	13–30 m (43–98 ft)	
Tendaguru	Kimmeridgian; Oxfordian	Nerinella	Trough cross bedded sandstone to massive sandstone	5–45 m (16–148 ft)	
Tendaguru	Mid Oxfordian ?Callovian	Lower Dinosaur	Cross bedded fine grained sandstones and siltstones, with Interbedded clay-rich siltstones	>20 m (66 ft)	
	Early Jurassic	Hiatus			
	Triassic	Hiatus			
	Paleozoic	Hiatus			
Basement	Neoproterozoic		Gneiss		

=== Paleogeography and depositional environment ===
==== Paleogeography ====
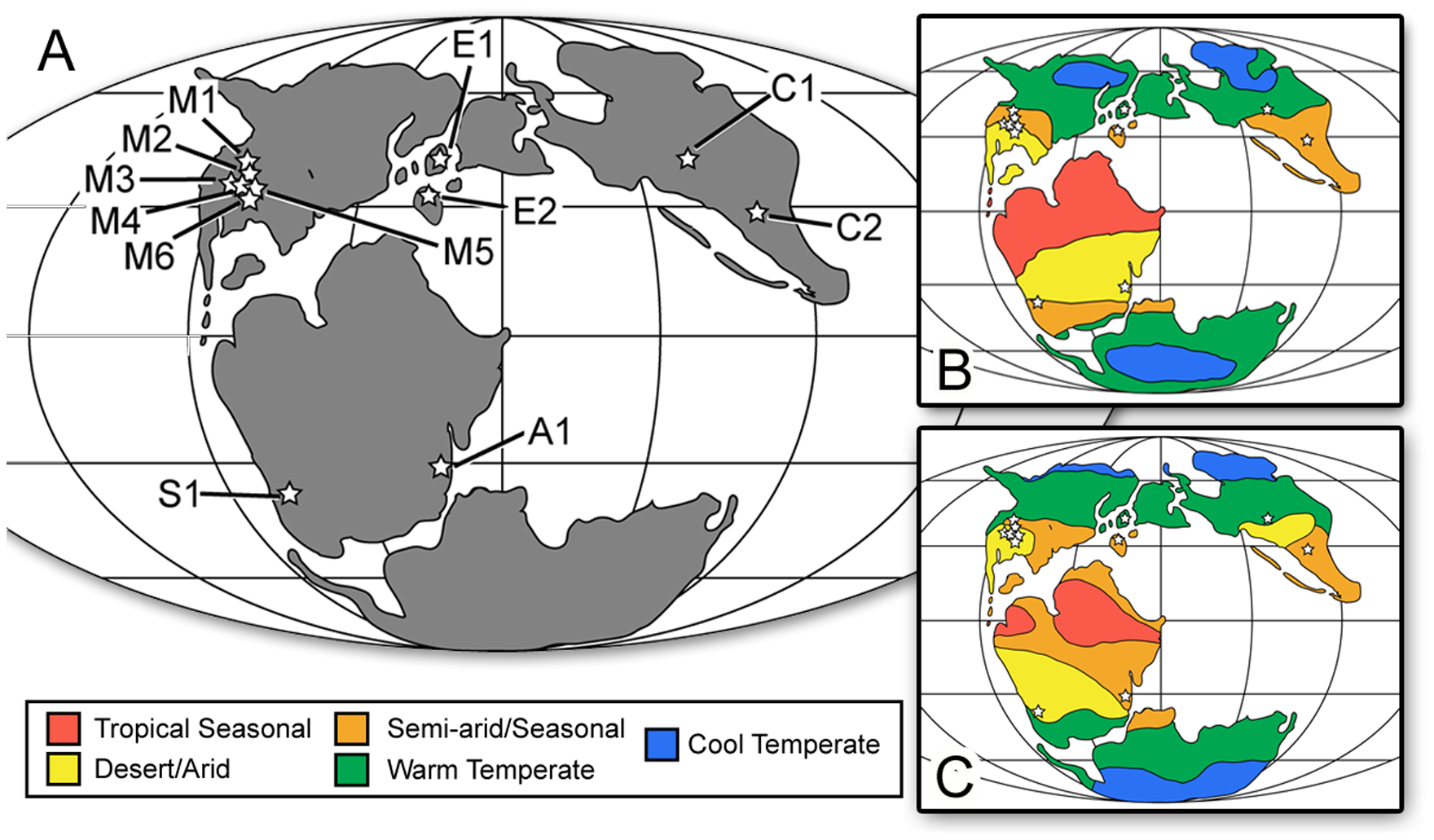
Paleogeography and paleoclimate of the Late Jurassic (150 Ma). The Tendaguru Formation is indicated by A1, the Morrison Formation with M1-6 and the Cañadón Calcáreo Formation with S1.

The Tendaguru Formation was deposited in the Mandawa Basin, a post-Karoo, Mesozoic rift basin located between the Ruvu Basin and Rufiji Trough to the north and the Ruvuma Basin to the south. To the west of the basin, Archean and Early Proterozoic basement rocks crop out. The main rift phase in present-day southeastern Africa led to the separation of Madagascar and the then-connected Indian subcontinent that happened during the Early Cretaceous. The Songo Songo and Kiliwani gas fields are located just offshore the basin.

At time of deposition the area was undergoing a semi-arid climate with coastal influences that maintained somewhat higher moisture levels than seen inland. The upper parts of the formation, the Middle Dinosaur and Rutitrigonia bornhardti-schwarzi Members in particular, showed prevailing semiarid conditions with pronounced dry seasons, based on palynologic analysis. The Tendaguru fauna was stable through the Late Jurassic.

During the Late Jurassic and Early Cretaceous, the Gondwana paleocontinent was breaking up and the separation of the Laurasian and Gondwana supercontinents resulted from the connection of the Tethys Ocean with the proto-Atlantic and the Pacific Ocean. In addition, the South Atlantic developed towards the end of the Late Jurassic with the separation of South America and Africa. Africa became increasingly isolated from most other continents by marine barriers from the Kimmeridgian into the Early Cretaceous, but retained a continental connection with South America. Global sea levels dropped significantly in the Early Jurassic and remained low through the Middle Jurassic but rose considerably towards the Late Jurassic, deepening the marine trenches between continents.

==== Depositional environment ====
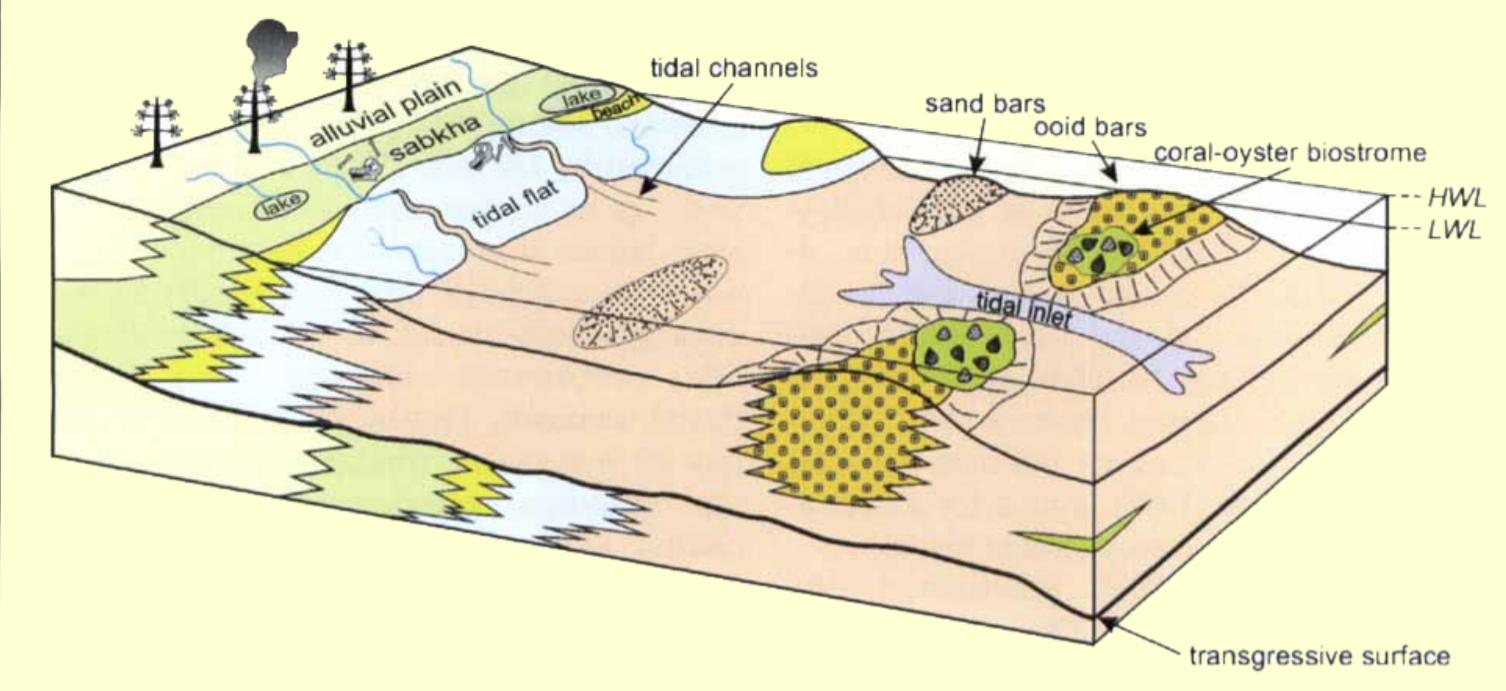
Generalized depositional environment of the Tendaguru Formation HWL - high water line, LWL - low water line

The sedimentary rocks and fossils record a repeated shift from shallow marine to tidal flat environments indicating that the strata of the Tendaguru Formation were deposited near an oscillating strandline which was controlled by sea level changes. The three dinosaur-bearing members are continental to marginal marine and the three sandstone-dominated members are marginal marine in origin.

Nerinella Member

The composition of benthic molluscs and foraminifera, euhaline to mesohaline ostracods, and dinoflagellate assemblages indicate marine, shallow water conditions for the Nerinella Member, in particular for the lower part. Sedimentation occurred as tidal channel fills, subtidal and tidal sand bars, minor storm layers (tempestites), and beach deposits. Overall, the Nerinella Member represents a variety of shallow subtidal to lower intertidal environments influenced by tides and storms.

Middle Dinosaur Member

The sedimentological characteristics of the basal part of the Middle Dinosaur Member suggest deposition on tidal flats and in small tidal channels of a lagoonal paleoenvironment. The ostracod Bythocypris sp. from the member indicates polyhaline to euhaline conditions. Slightly higher up, a faunal sample dominated by the bivalve Eomiodon and an ostracod assemblage composed of brackish to freshwater taxa is indicative of a brackish water paleoenvironment with distinct influx of freshwater as revealed by the nonmarine ostracod genus Cypridea, charophytes, and other freshwater algae. The paleoenvironment of the ostracod assemblages of the Middle Dinosaur Member changed upsection from a marine setting in the basal parts through alternating marine-brackish conditions to freshwater conditions in the higher parts of this member. The highly sporadic occurrence, in this part of the section, of molluscs typical of marginal marine habitats indicates only a very weak marine influence, at sabkha-like coastal plains with ephemeral brackish lakes and ponds are recorded in the upper part of the Middle Dinosaur Member. This part also contains pedogenic calcretes indicating subaerial exposure and the onset of soil formation. The calcrete intraclasts within adjacent sandstone beds testify to erosive reworking of calcrete horizons. The presence of crocodyilforms indicates freshwater to littoral environments and adjacent terrestrial areas.

Indotrigonia africana Member

The coarse-grained sandstone of the lower part of the Indotrigonia africana Member that shows highly variable transport directions is interpreted as deposits of large tidal channels. Grain-size, large-scale sedimentary structures, and the lack of both trace fossils and epifaunal and infaunal body fossils suggest high water energy and frequent reworking. This basal succession passes upward in cross-bedded sandstone and minor siltstone and claystone with flaser or lenticular bedding that are interpreted as tidal flat and tidal channel deposits. Horizontal to low-angle cross-bedded, fine-grained sandstone with intercalated bivalve pavements indicates tidal currents that operated in small flood and ebb tidal deltas and along the coast. Stacked successions of trough cross-bedded, medium- to coarse-grained sandstone of the upper part of the Indotrigonia africana Member are interpreted as tidal channel and sand bar deposits. At some places in the surroundings of Tendaguru Hill, these sediments interfinger with oolitic limestone layers that represent high-energy ooid shoals.

In the Tingutinguti stream section, the Indotrigonia africana Member exhibits several up to 20 centimetres (7.9 in) thick, poorly sorted, conglomeratic sandstone beds. They contain mud clasts, reworked concretions and/or accumulations of thick-shelled bivalves (mainly Indotrigonia africana and Seebachia janenschi), and exhibit megaripple surfaces. These conglomeratic sandstone layers are interpreted as storm deposits. In the Dwanika and Bolachikombe stream sections, and in a small tributary of the Bolachikombe creek, a discrete, up to 70 centimetres (2.3 ft) thick conglomerate in the lower portion of the Indotrigonia africana Member displays evidence of a tsunami deposit. Overall, lithofacies and the diverse macroinvertebrate and microfossil assemblages of the Indotrigonia africana Member suggest a shallow marine environment. Based on the diverse mesoflora and the abundance of Classopollis, a nearby vegetated hinterland is postulated that was dominated by xerophytic conifers.

Upper Dinosaur Member

The small-scale trough and ripple cross-bedded fine-grained sandstone at the base of the Upper Dinosaur Member is interpreted as tidal flat deposits. Unfossiliferous sandstone in the upper part was most likely deposited in small fluvial channels in a coastal plain environment, whereas argillaceous deposits were laid down in still water bodies such as small lakes and ponds. Rare occurrences of the ostracod Cypridea and charophytes signal the influence of freshwater, whereas the sporadic occurrence of marine invertebrates suggests a depositional environment close to the sea.

Rutitrigonia bornhardti-schwarzi Member

Fining upward sequences of the basal part of the Rutitrigonia bornhardti-schwarzi Member are interpreted as tidal channel fills, the overlying fine-grained sandstone, silt- and claystone as tidal flat deposits. From the immediate surroundings of Tendaguru Hill, invertebrates and vertebrates are poorly known and limit the palaeoenvironmental interpretation of this member. The composition of the land-derived sporomorph assemblage suggests a terrestrial vegetation which was dominated by cheirolepidiacean conifers in association with ferns.

== Excavation history ==
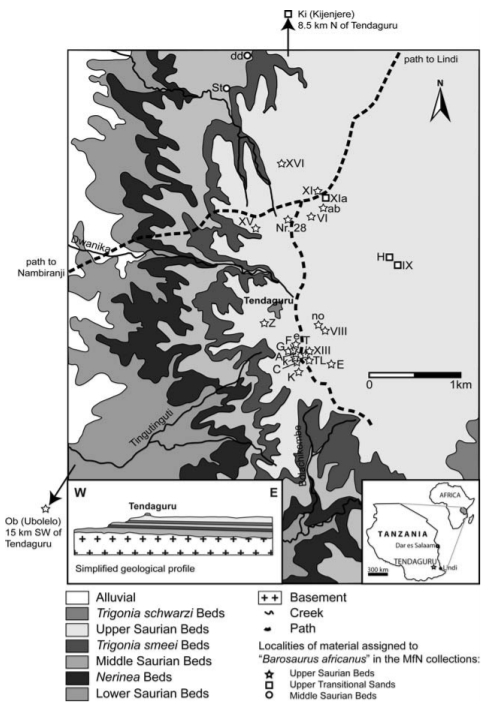
Geological map of the Tendaguru Formation with sample locations

The Tendaguru Beds as a fossil deposit were first discovered in 1906, when German pharmacist, chemical analyst and mining engineer Bernhard Wilhelm Sattler, on his way to a mine south of the Mbemkure River in German East Africa in today's Tanzania, was shown by his local staff enormous bones weathering out of the path near the base of Tendaguru Hill, 10 kilometres (6.2 mi) south of Mtapaia (close to Nambiranji village, Mipingo ward, 60 kilometres (37 mi) northwest of Lindi town). Because of its morphology, the hill was locally known as "steep hill" or "tendaguru" in the language of the local Wamwera people. Sattler forwarded his report on the giant bones to the Kommission für die landeskundliche Erforschung der deutschen Schutzgebiete ("Commission for the Geographical Investigation of the German Protectorates"), headed by the geographer Hans Meyer. Meyer, in turn, wrote to the palaeontologist Eberhard Fraas, who was in East Africa at that time, and urged him to hasten to the Tendaguru site. The latter visited the site in 1907 and, with the aid of Sattler, recovered two partial skeletons of enormous size.

Following the discovery in 1906, teams from the Museum für Naturkunde, Berlin (1907–1913), and later the British Museum (Natural History), London (1924–1931) launched a series of collecting expeditions that remain unequalled in scope and ambition. Led by the vision and influence of geologist Wilhelm von Branca, the German expeditions were particularly successful. This was largely due as the project was regarded as a matter of national ambition of the German Empire and enjoyed the benevolence of wealthy patrons. Eventually, nearly 250 tons of fossils were shipped to Berlin, representing an entirely new dinosaur fauna that remains the best understood assemblage from all of former Gondwana.

From there, the material was transported to Fraas' institution, the Royal Natural History Collection in Stuttgart, Germany. Fraas described two species in the badly known genus "Gigantosaurus"; G. robustus and G. africanus (today Janenschia robusta and Tornieria africana, respectively.

=== German Tendaguru Expedition ===
The Berlin Natural History Museum excavated at Tendaguru hill and in the surroundings for four years. From 1909 through 1911, Werner Janensch as expedition leader and Edwin Hennig as assistant directed excavations, while Hans Reck and his wife Ina Reck led the 1912 field season. Other European participants included Hans von Staff. In the rainy seasons the scientists explored the geology of German East Africa on long safaris.

=== Public discussion about provenance and restitution ===
In the context of international discussion about the provenance and possible restitution of colonial heritage, as discussed for example in the 2018 report on the restitution of African cultural heritage, both German as well as Tanzanian commentators have called the claim to rightful ownership by the Berlin museum into question. The Tanzanian government has, however, not submitted any official demand for repatriation. German authorities have preferred to offer information on the provenance and research by increasing cooperation between Tanzanian paleontologists and museums with their German counterparts.

=== In popular culture ===
In 1998, an illustrated book in Swahili, whose title translates as Dinosaurs of Tendaguru, was published for young readers in East Africa. It presents a slightly different, fictitious story of the first discovery, which is attributed to a Tanzanian farmer, rather than to the German engineer Sattler.

== Paleontological significance ==
Possible dinosaur eggs have been recovered from the formation. Further, the fauna of the Tendaguru Formation has been correlated with the Morrison Formation of the central-western United States, several formations in England, such as the Kimmeridge Clay and Oxford Clay, and in France (Sables de Glos, Argiles d'Octeville, Marnes de Bléville), the Alcobaça, Guimarota and Lourinhã Formations in Portugal, the Villar del Arzobispo Formation in Spain, the Shishugou, Kalazha and Shangshaximiao Formations in China, the Toqui Formation in the Magallanes Basin, Chile and the Cañadón Calcáreo Formation in the Cañadón Asfalto Basin in central Patagonia, Argentina.

=== Fossil content ===
Color key: Taxon / Reclassified taxon / Taxon falsely reported as present / Dubious taxon or junior synonym / Ichnotaxon / Ootaxon / Morphotaxon

Notes
Uncertain or tentative taxa are in small text
~~crossed out~~ taxa are discredited.

==== Mammaliaformes ====
Mammaliaformes reported from the Tendaguru Formation
Genus	Species	Location	Member	Material	Notes	Images
Allostaffia	A. aenigmatica	Quarry Ig	Middle Dinosaur	Three isolated molars	Originally described as Staffia, later renamed Allostaffia as Staffia was preoccupied bya foraminifer. Assigned to Haramiyida (though possibly a gondwanathere instead).	
Brancatherulum	B. tendagurense	Unspecified	Upper Dinosaur	Dentary without teeth	Either a stem-zatherian or dryolestidan.	
Tendagurodon	T. janenschi	Quarry Ig	Middle Dinosaur	Single tooth	One of the earliest amphilestids	
Tendagurutherium	T. dietrichi	Quarry Ig	Middle Dinosaur	Partial dentary with damaged last molar	Either a peramurid or an australosphenidan	

==== Squamates ====
Squamates reported from the Tendaguru Formation
Genus	Species	Location	Member	Material	Notes	Images
Paramacellodidae?	Indeterminate			An osteoderm	Unconfirmed	

==== Pterosaurs ====
Pterosaurs reported from the Tendaguru Formation
Genus	Species	Location	Member	Material	Notes	Images
Tendaguripterus	T. recki	Quarry Ig	Middle Dinosaur	A partial mandible with teeth		Pterosaur fossils from Tendaguru
?Indeterminate archaeopterodactyloid		Mkoawa Mtwara		Humerus		Pterosaur fossils from Tendaguru
Indeterminate azhdarchid		Mkoawa Mtwara				Pterosaur fossils from Tendaguru
Indeterminate dsungaripteroid			Upper Dinosaur	Humerus		Pterosaur fossils from Tendaguru
Pterodactylus	P. maximus	Mkoawa Mtwara			Later determined to be an indeterminate pterodactyloid	Pterosaur fossils from Tendaguru
Pterodactylus	P. brancai	Mkoawa Mtwara		Tibiotarsi	Later determined to be an indeterminate dsungaripteroid	Pterosaur fossils from Tendaguru
Pterodactylus	P. arningi	Mkoawa Mtwara			Later determined to be an indeterminate pterosaur	Pterosaur fossils from Tendaguru
Rhamphorhynchus	R. tendagurensis	Mkoawa Mtwara			Later determined to be an indeterminate "rhamphorhynchoid"	Pterosaur fossils from Tendaguru

==== Ornithischians ====
Ornithischians reported from the Tendaguru Formation
Genus	Species	Location	Member	Material	Notes	Images
Dysalotosaurus	D. lettowvorbecki	Quarry Ig	Middle Dinosaur	"Large number of mostly disassociated cranial and postcranial elements"	A dryosaurid	
Kentrosaurus	K. aethiopicus	Quarry Q, Ig, St, S, Ny, Li, XX, r, y, d, Ng, X, H, IX, Om, bb, Ha, XIV, II, IV, V, VIII, G, e, g, Ki	Lower, Middle & Upper Dinosaur	"[Two] composite mounted skeletons, [four] braincases, [seven] sacra, more than [seventy] femora, approximately 25 isolated elements, juvenile to adult"	A stegosaur	

==== Sauropods ====
Sauropods reported from the Tendaguru Formation
Genus	Species	Location	Member	Material	Notes	Images
Australodocus	A. bohetii	Quarry G	Upper Dinosaur	Two neck vertebrae; more undescribed remains destroyed during World War II	A Somphospondylan	
Dicraeosaurus	D. hansemanni	Quarry Q, m, St, dd, Sa	Lower, Middle & Upper Dinosaur	"Skeleton lacking skull and forelimbs, [two] partial skeletons, isolated vertebrae, and limb elements"	A Dicraeosaurid	
Dicraeosaurus	D. sattleri	Quarry La, s, O, ab, E, M, o, Ob, bb, XIV, G, GD	Middle & Upper Dinosaur	"[Two] partial skeletons without skulls, isolated postcranial remains"	A Dicraeosaurid	
Giraffatitan	G. brancai	Quarry Q, J, Ig, Y, St, dd, S, TL, XX, Ma, JR, Ng, Bo, To, p, t, Lw, D, N, ab, cc, X, IX, Z, T, Aa, l, E, XIV, II, G, e, Ki, No, R, F, XII, GD, XV, Sa, U, i	Lower, Middle & Upper Dinosaur		Brachiosaurid. The new genus Giraffatitan was erected to hold the former Brachiosaurus species, B. brancai after scientists concluded that it was distinct enough from the Brachiosaurus type species, B. altithorax, to warrant such a reclassification.	
Janenschia	J. robusta	Quarry dd, P, IX, B, G, Oa, NB	Middle & Upper Dinosaur	Known from hindlimb and forelimb material, left pubis and two right ischia	A non-neosauropod eusauropod	
Tendaguria	T. tanzaniensis	Nambango site	Upper Dinosaur	"[Two] associated cranial dorsal vertebrae."	A turiasaur	
Tornieria	T. africana	Quarry St, k, MD, A, e, Sa	Middle & Upper Dinosaur	"More than [three] partial skeletons, a few skull elements, [and] many isolated postcranial elements"	Diplodocid	
Wamweracaudia	W. keranjei			A sequence of caudal vertebrae	Mamenchisaurid	
Brachiosaurus	B. brancai	Mkoawa Mtwara		"[Five] partial skeletons, more than [three] skulls, [and] isolated limb elements"	B. brancai was distinct enough from the non-Tendaguru Brachiosaurus type species B. altithorax that it was moved to its own genus, Giraffatitan.	
Brachiosaurus	B. fraasi				Remains attributed to B. fraasi were later referred to B. brancai, and thus now Giraffatitan	
Diplodocinae indet.	Indeterminate	Kijenjere	Upper Dinosaur	Partial skull	Belonging to a form that is closely related to Diplodocus	
Diplodocidae indet.	Indeterminate	Kijenjere	Upper Dinosaur	Caudal vertebrae and metatarsal	Originally referred to as "Barosaurus africanus"	
Diplodocidae indet.	Indeterminate	Trench XIV	Upper Dinosaur	Articulated pedes	Possibly representing two different taxa	
Flagellicaudata indet.	Indeterminate		Upper Dinosaur	Braincase	Referred to Flagellicaudata indet. based on the derived characters shared with this group	
"The Archbishop"					Brachiosaur, distinct from Giraffatitan (Note: Formal description in preparation by Michael Taylor in 2019)	

==== Theropods ====
Theropods reported from the Tendaguru Formation
Genus	Species	Location	Member	Material	Notes	Images
Abelisauroidea indet.	Indeterminate	Quarry TL	Upper Dinosaur and Middle Dinosaur	Tibia and a femur	Indeterminate small abelisauroids.	
Abelisauridae indet.	Indeterminate		Upper Dinosaur and Middle Dinosaur	Leg bones and teeth	Indeterminate abelisaurids.	
Megalosauroidea indet.	Indeterminate	Quarry MW	Upper Dinosaur	left tibia and left astragalus	A large indeterminate megalosauroid. Possibly Torvosaurus.	
Elaphrosaurus	E. bambergi	Quarry Ig, dd, ?RD	Middle Dinosaur Upper Dinosaur?	"Postcranial skeleton"	An elaphrosaurine noasaurid A ischium from the Upper Dinosaur Member,HMN MB.R.1756, may belong to Elaphrosaurus.	
Ostafrikasaurus	O. crassiserratus	Quarry Om	Upper Dinosaur	"Tooth"	A tooth of controversial affinities, had either been suggested to have been a spinosaurid or a ceratosaurid.	
Veterupristisaurus	V. milneri	Quarry St	Middle Dinosaur	"Vertebrae"	The earliest known carcharodontosaurid. Possible remains known from the Upper Dinosaur Member.	
?Allosaurus	?A. tendagurensis	Quarry TL	Middle Dinosaur	A tibia	Remains now considered "Tetanurae indet." Possibly a megalosauroid or carcharodontosaurid. Originally referred to Allosauridae. Some recent studies support a megalosauroid indentity.	
Torvosaurus	T. sp	Quarry St, MW	Upper Dinosaur Middle Dinosaur	Teeth	Includes remains previously referred to "Megalosaurus" ingens - now referred to Torvosaurus sp. This assignment was challenged by Rauhut et al,but this was refuted in a reply to Rauhut,which noted several features affirming the referral to Torvosaurus were ignored by Rauhut et al. Later studies reaffirmed that Torvosaurus possessed a diagnostic dentition.	
Ceratosauridae indet.	Indeterminate		Middle and Upper Dinosaur	Caudal centrum and teeth	Indeterminate ceratosaurids. Originally referred to Labrosaurus stechowi & Ceratosaurus roechingli.	

==== Crocodyliformes ====
Genus	Species	Location	Member	Material	Notes	Images
Bernissartia	B. sp	Dysalotosaurus Quarry	Upper & Middle Dinosaur	teeth		Bernissartia

==== Amphibians ====
Genus	Species	Member	Material	Notes	Images
Anura	indeterminate	Middle Dinosaur	MB.Am.1551, distal portion of a left humerus; MB.Am.1552, distal portion of a right humerus.	Similar to the Alytidae and Pelodytidae	
?Salientia indet	indeterminate	Middle Dinosaur	MB.Am.1553, diaphysis and part of the distal portion of a right humerus; MB.Am.1554, fragment of tibiofibula or radioulna; MB.Am. 1555, phalanx.		

==== Fish ====
Genus	Species	Member	Notes	Images
Engaibatis	Engaibatis schultzei	Upper Dinosaur		
Lepidotes	Lepidotes tendaguruensis	Middle Dinosaur		
Lepidotes	L. sp.	Upper & Middle Dinosaur		
Hybodus	Hybodus sp.	Upper Dinosaur		
Lonchidion	Lonchidion sp.	Upper Dinosaur		
Sphenodus	Sphenodus sp.	Upper Dinosaur		

==== Invertebrates ====
===== Gastropods =====
Genus	Species	Member bold is defining	Notes	Images
Pseudomelania	Pseudomelania dietrichi	Middle Dinosaur		
Promathildia	Promathildia sp.	Middle Dinosaur		
Nerinella	Nerinella cutleri	Nerinella		

===== Bivalves =====
Genus	Species	Member bold is defining	Notes	Images
Eomiodon	Eomiodon cutleri	Upper Dinosaur		
Indotrigonia	Indotrigonia africana	Indotrigonia africana		
Indotrigonia	I. dietrichi	Lower Dinosaur		
Rutitrigonia	Rutitrigonia bornhardti	Rutitrigonia bornhardti-schwarzi		
Rutitrigonia	R. schwarzi	Rutitrigonia bornhardti-schwarzi		
Acesta	Acesta cutleri	Lower Dinosaur		
Actinostreon	Actinostreon hennigi	Indotrigonia africana		
Entolium	Entolium corneolum	Lower Dinosaur		
Falcimytilus	Falcimytilus dietrichi	Middle Dinosaur		
Grammatodon	Grammatodon irritans	Lower Dinosaur		
Liostrea	Liostrea dubiensis	Indotrigonia africana		
Liostrea	L. kindopeensis	Indotrigonia africana		
Lithophaga	Lithophaga suboblonga	Indotrigonia africana		
Meleagrinella	Meleagrinella radiata	Lower Dinosaur		
Nanogyra	Nanogyra nana	Lower Dinosaur		
Protocardia	Protocardia schenki	Lower Dinosaur		
Seebachia	Seebachia janenschi	Indotrigonia africana		

===== Coral =====
Genus	Species	Member bold is defining	Notes	Images
Astrocoenia	Astrocoenia bernensis	Indotrigonia africana		
Meandrophyllia	Meandrophyllia oolithotithonica	Indotrigonia africana		
Thamnoseris	Thamnoseris sp.	Indotrigonia africana		

===== Ostracods =====
Genus	Species	Member bold is defining	Notes	Images
Bythocypris	Bythocypris sp.	Middle Dinosaur		
Cypridea	Cypridea sp.	Middle & Upper Dinosaur		

=== Flora ===
Group	Taxa	Member	Notes	Images
Araucariaceae	Araucariacites	Lower Dinosaur		
Cheirolepidiaceae	Classopollis	Indotrigonia africana Lower Dinosaur		
Cupressaceae	Cupressinoxylon sp.	Rutitrigonia bornhardti-schwarzi		
Cycadaceae	Cycadoxylon sp.	Indotrigonia africana		
Ginkgoaceae	Ginkgoxylon sp.	Rutitrigonia bornhardti-schwarzi		
Taxodiaceae	Glyptostroboxylon sp.	Middle Dinosaur		
Taxaceae	Taxaceoxylon sp.	Rutitrigonia bornhardti-schwarzi		
Prasinophyta	Cymatiosphaera sp.	Indotrigonia africana		
Zygnemataceae	Ovoidites parvus	Middle Dinosaur		
Dinoflagellates	various	Indotrigonia africana Middle Dinosaur		
Gymnosperm pollen	various	Indotrigonia africana Middle Dinosaur		
Pteridophytic and bryophytic spores	various	Indotrigonia africana Middle Dinosaur		

== See also ==
- List of stratigraphic units with dinosaur body fossils
- List of African dinosaurs
- Manda Formation, Triassic fossiliferous formation of Tanzania
- Usili Formation, Permian fossiliferous formation of Tanzania
- Mugher Mudstone, Tithonian fossiliferous formation of Ethiopia
- Ksar Metlili Formation, Tithonian to Berriasian fossiliferous formation of Morocco
- Kirkwood Formation, Berriasian to Hauterivian fossiliferous formation of South Africa
- Sundays River Formation, Valanginian to Hauterivian fossiliferous formation of South Africa
- Bajada Colorada Formation, Berriasian to Valanginian fossiliferous formation of Argentina
- Dinosaurs of Tendaguru, Book for young readers in Swahili

== Notes and references ==
=== Bibliography ===
Geology

- Aberhan, Martin; Bussert, Robert; Heinrich, Wolf-Dieter; Schrank, Eckhart; Schultka, Stephan; Sames, Benjamin; Kriwet, Jürgen; Kapilima, Saidi (2002), "Palaeoecology and depositional environments of the Tendaguru Beds (Late Jurassic to Early Cretaceous, Tanzania)" (PDF), Fossil Record, 5 (1): 19–44, Bibcode:2002FossR...5...19A, doi:10.5194/fr-5-19-2002 Material was copied from this source, which is available under a Creative Commons Attribution 4.0 International License.
- Bussert, Robert; Heinrich, Wolf-Dieter; Aberhan, Martin (2009), "The Tendaguru Formation (Late Jurassic to Early Cretaceous, southern Tanzania): definition, palaeoenvironments, and sequence stratigraphy" (PDF), Fossil Record, 12 (2): 141–174, Bibcode:2009FossR..12..141B, doi:10.1002/mmng.200900004, ISSN 1435-1943 Material was copied from this source, which is available under a Creative Commons Attribution 4.0 International License.
- Muhongo, S (2013), Tanzania: an emerging energy producer (PDF), Chatham House, London, pp. 1–35

Paleontology

- Arratia, Gloria; Kriwet, Jürgen; Heinrich, Wolf-Dietrich (2002), "Selachians and actinopterygians from the Upper Jurassic of Tendaguru, Tanzania" (PDF), Fossil Record, 5 (1): 207–230, Bibcode:2002FossR...5..207A, doi:10.1002/mmng.20020050112 Material was copied from this source, which is available under a Creative Commons Attribution 4.0 International License.
- Averianov, A.O.; Martin, T. (2015), "Ontogeny and taxonomy of Paurodon valens (Mammalia, Cladotheria) from the Upper Jurassic Morrison Formation of USA" (PDF), Proceedings of the Zoological Institute RAS, 319 (3): 326–340, doi:10.31610/trudyzin/2015.319.3.326
- Barrett, P.M.; Butler, R.J.; Edwards, N.P.; Milner, A.R. (2008), "Pterosaur distribution in time and space: an atlas, pp. 61-107, in Flugsaurier: Pterosaur papers in honour of Peter Wellnhofer - Hone, D.W.E., and Buffetaut, É. (eds)" (PDF), Zitteliana B, 28: 1–264
- Buffetaut, Éric (2012), "An early spinosaurid dinosaur from the Late Jurassic of Tendaguru (Tanzania) and the evolution of the spinosaurid dentition" (PDF), Oryctos, 10: 1–8
- Chimento, Nicholas; Agnolín, Frederico; Martinelli, Agustin (2016), Mesozoic Mammals from South America: Implications for understanding early mammalian faunas from Gondwana, Historia evolutiva y paleobiogeográfica de los vertebrados de América del Sur, pp. 199–209
- Cifelli, Richard L (2003), "A graveyard of titans" (PDF), Acta Palaeontologica Polonica, 48: 608 Material was copied from this source, which is available under a Creative Commons Attribution 4.0 International License.
- Costa, F.R.; Kellner, A.W.A. (2009), "On two pterosaur humeri from the Tendaguru beds (Upper Jurassic, Tanzania)" (PDF), Anais da Academia Brasileira de Ciências, 81 (4): 813–818, Bibcode:2009AnABC..81..813C, doi:10.1590/S0001-37652009000400017, PMID 19893904
- Fraas, E (1908), "Ostafrikanische Dinosaurier", Palaeontographica, 55: 105–144 (in German)
- Galton, Peter M (1980), "Avian-like tibiotarsi of pterodactyloids (Reptilia: Pterosauria) from the Upper Jurassic of East Africa", Paläontologische Zeitschrift, 54 (3): 331–342, Bibcode:1980PalZ...54..331G, doi:10.1007/BF02988135
- Heinrich, Wolf-Dieter; Bussert, Robert; Aberhan, Martin (2011), "A blast from the past: the lost world of dinosaurs at Tendaguru, East Africa", Geology Today, 27 (3), Wiley: 101–106, Bibcode:2011GeolT..27..101H, doi:10.1111/j.1365-2451.2011.00795.x, ISSN 0266-6979
- Heinrich, Wolf-Dieter (2004), "Allostaffia, a new genus name for Staffia Heinrich, 1999 (Allotheria, Haramiyida) preoccupied by Staffia Schubert, 1911 (Protista, Foraminifera)" (PDF), Fossil Record, 7 (1): 153, Bibcode:2004FossR...7..153H, doi:10.5194/fr-7-153-2004
- Heinrich, Wolf-Dieter (1998), "Late Jurassic mammals from Tendaguru, Tanzania", Journal of Mammalian Evolution, 5 (4): 269–290, doi:10.1023/A:1020548010203
- Kahlert, Eberhard; Schultka, Stephan; Süß, Herbert (1999), "Die mesophytische Flora der Saurierlagerstätte am Tendaguru (Tansania) Erste Ergebnisse" (PDF), Fossil Record, 2 (1): 185–199, Bibcode:1999FossR...2..185K, doi:10.1002/mmng.1999.4860020114 (in German)
- Maier, G (2003), African dinosaurs unearthed: the Tendaguru expeditions, Indiana University Press, Bloomington, Indiana (Life of the Past Series), pp. 1–432, ISBN 978-0-253-00054-5
- Mannion, Philip D.; Upchurch, Paul; Schwarz, Daniela; Wings, Oliver (2019), "Taxonomic affinities of the putative titanosaurs from the Late Jurassic Tendaguru Formation of Tanzania: phylogenetic and biogeographic implications for eusauropod dinosaur evolution", Zoological Journal of the Linnean Society, 185 (3): 784–909, doi:10.1093/zoolinnean/zly068
- Mateus, O.; Mannion, P.D.; Upchurch, P. (2014), "Zby atlanticus, a new turiasaurian sauropod (Dinosauria, Eusauropoda) from the Late Jurassic of Portugal", Journal of Vertebrate Paleontology, 34 (3): 618–634, Bibcode:2014JVPal..34..618M, doi:10.1080/02724634.2013.822875
- Mateus, Octávio (2006), "Late Jurassic dinosaurs from the Morrison Formation (USA), the Lourinhā and Alcobaça formations (Portugal), and the Tendaguru Beds (Tanzania): a comparison, in Paleontology and Geology of the Upper Morrison Formation", New Mexico Museum of Natural History and Science Bulletin, 36: 223–232, ISSN 1524-4156
- Noto, Christopher R.; Grossmann, Ari (2010), "Broad-Scale Patterns of Late Jurassic Dinosaur Paleoecology", PLoS ONE, 5 (9): 1–11, Bibcode:2010PLoSO...512553N, doi:10.1371/journal.pone.0012553, PMC 2933236, PMID 20838442
- Paul, G.S (1988), "The brachiosaur giants of the Morrison Tendaguru with a description of a new subgenus, Giraffatitan, and a comparison of the world's largest dinosaurs", Hunteria, 2: 1–14
- Rauhut, Oliver W.M (2011), "Theropod dinosaurs from the Late Jurassic of Tendaguru (Tanzania)", Special Papers in Palaeontology, 86: 195–239
- Remes, Kristian (2009), "Taxonomy of Late Jurassic diplodocid sauropods from Tendaguru (Tanzania)" (PDF), Fossil Record, 12 (1): 23–46, Bibcode:2009FossR..12...23R, doi:10.1002/mmng.200800008
- Remes, Kristian (2007), "A second Gondwanan diplodocid dinosaur from the Upper Jurassic Tendaguru Beds of Tanzania, East Africa", Palaeontology, 50 (3): 653–667, Bibcode:2007Palgy..50..653R, doi:10.1111/j.1475-4983.2007.00652.x
- Schrank, Eckhart (1999), "Palynology of the Dinosaur Beds of Tendaguru (Tanzania) - Preliminary Results" (PDF), Fossil Record, 2 (1): 171–183, Bibcode:1999FossR...2..171S, doi:10.5194/fr-2-171-1999
- Schwarz-Wings, Daniela; Böhm, Nico (2014), "A morphometric approach to the specific separation of the humeri and femora of Dicraeosaurus from the Late Jurassic of Tendaguru, Tanzania" (PDF), Acta Palaeontologica Polonica, 59 (1): 81–98, Bibcode:2014AcPaP..59...81S, doi:10.4202/app.2011.0095
- Taylor, M.P (2009), "A Re-evaluation of Brachiosaurus altithorax Riggs 1903 (Dinosauria, Sauropod) and its generic separation from Giraffatitan brancai (Janensch 1914)" (PDF), Journal of Vertebrate Paleontology, 29 (3): 787–806, Bibcode:2009JVPal..29..787T, doi:10.1671/039.029.0309, S2CID 15220647, archived from the original (PDF) on 2 April 2019
- Weishampel, David B.; Dodson, Peter; Osmólska, Halszka (2004), The Dinosauria, 2nd edition, Berkeley: University of California Press, pp. 1–880, ISBN 0-520-24209-2
