= Kristín Þóra Haraldsdóttir =

Icelandic actress and musician (born 1982)

- Born: Kristín Þóra Haraldsdóttir; 25 February 1982 (age 44); Reykjavík, Iceland
- Education: Iceland Academy of the Arts
- Occupation: Actress
- Years active: 2007–present

Kristín Þóra Haraldsdóttir (translit. Kristin Thora Haraldsdottir; born 25 February 1982) is an Icelandic actress and musician. She graduated from the drama department of the Iceland Academy of the Arts in the spring of 2007.

== History ==
After graduation, Kristín Þóra was employed by the Akureyri Theatre Company, where she played in Óvitar, Ökutímum, and Fló on Skinn. In spring 2008, she was employed by the Reykjavík City Theatre and in the National Theatre of Iceland, where she has appeared in several plays: The West One, The Ruins, The People in the Cellar, The Hurricane, The Styrian Pet, The Darling Child, Fanny and Alexander, Tengdó, Little Hamlet, Wishbone, Socrates, Flood, along with the advertisement of the year, The Strip, and God Bless Iceland.

She appeared in the Icelandic TV series Prisoners (Icelandic: Fangar, 2017), directed by Ragnar Bragason, and as Gunna in the 2017 series Stella Blómkvist. She stars in the upcoming TV show The Danish Woman.

From recent film projects, she has appeared as the lead role in two films, Sundance winner and international hit film And Breathe Normally (Icelandic: Andið Eðlilega, 2018) directed by Ísold Uggadóttir playing the role of Lára, and as the character Magnea in Let Me Fall (Icelandic: Lof mér að falla, 2018) directed by Baldvin Z, which premiered at TIFF in 2018.

Kristín Þóra was selected in the group "Shooting Stars" 2019 by European Film Promotion. Each year they select ten promising actors and actresses from among their members, who have received special attention in their country and internationally.

== Nominations and awards ==
Kristín Þóra was awarded the 2016 Grimm Prize as the Best Actress in Supporting Role for her role in the advertisement of the year.

She was nominated for Grimur as the Actress of the Year in a Supporting Role for her role in Gauragangi, and nominated as Best Actress of the Year in the Lead Role, for playing in Oskasteinn and Peggy Pickit sees the face of God.

She has also received the Stefania Jack from Mrs Stefanía Guðmundsdóttir's Memorial Fund in 2014. And for her theatre work, she won the Icelandic Theatre Award (2015), and an Icelandic Honorary Award for Outstanding work as an actress (2014).

In 2019, she received the Edda as Best Supporting Actress for her role in the film Praise Me to Fall and was nominated as Best Actress of the Year in the Lead Role for Spiritual Mission.
