= Tromsø International Film Festival =

Annual film festival held in Tromsø, Norway

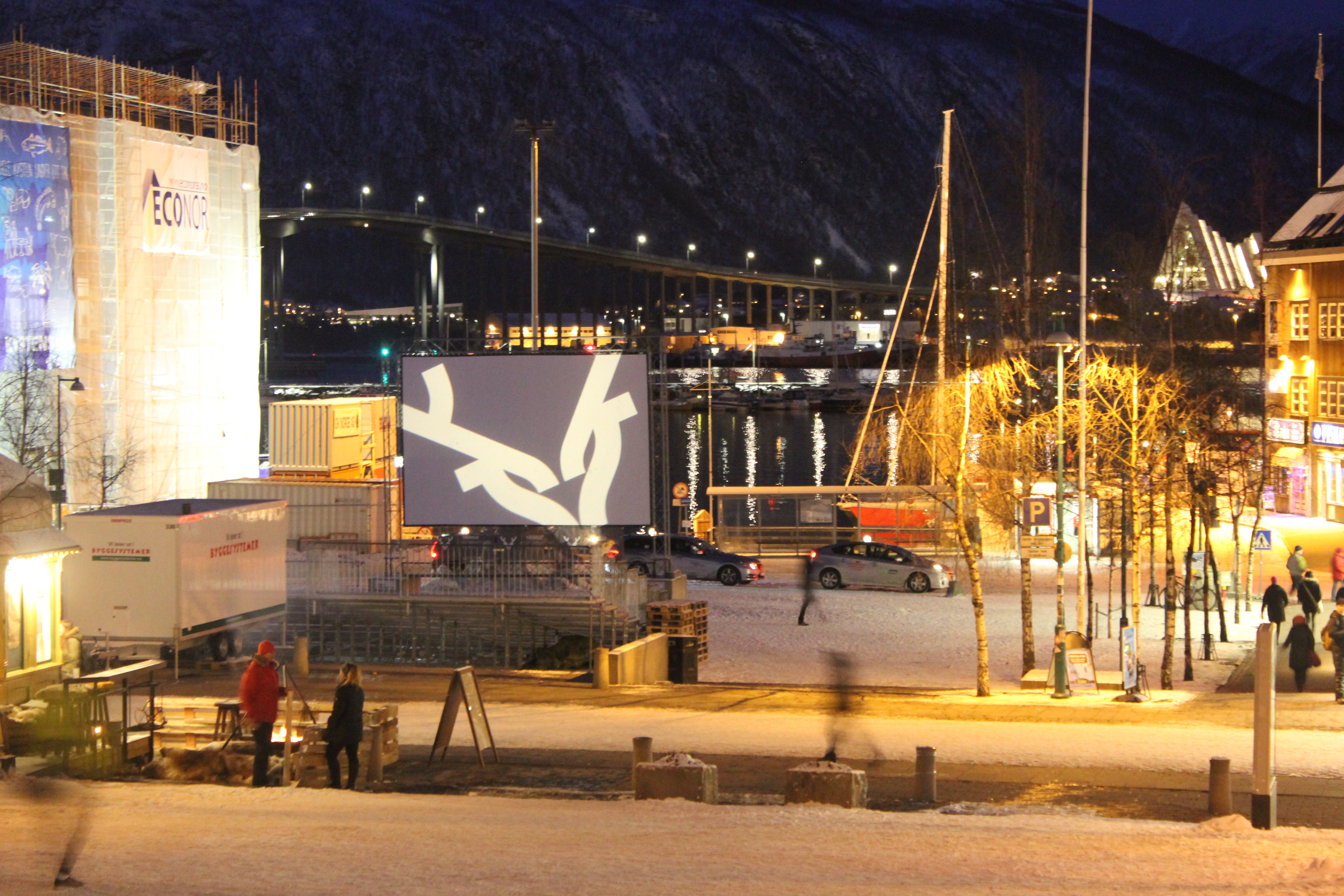
Outdoor cinema in Tromsø city centre during the 2015 festival

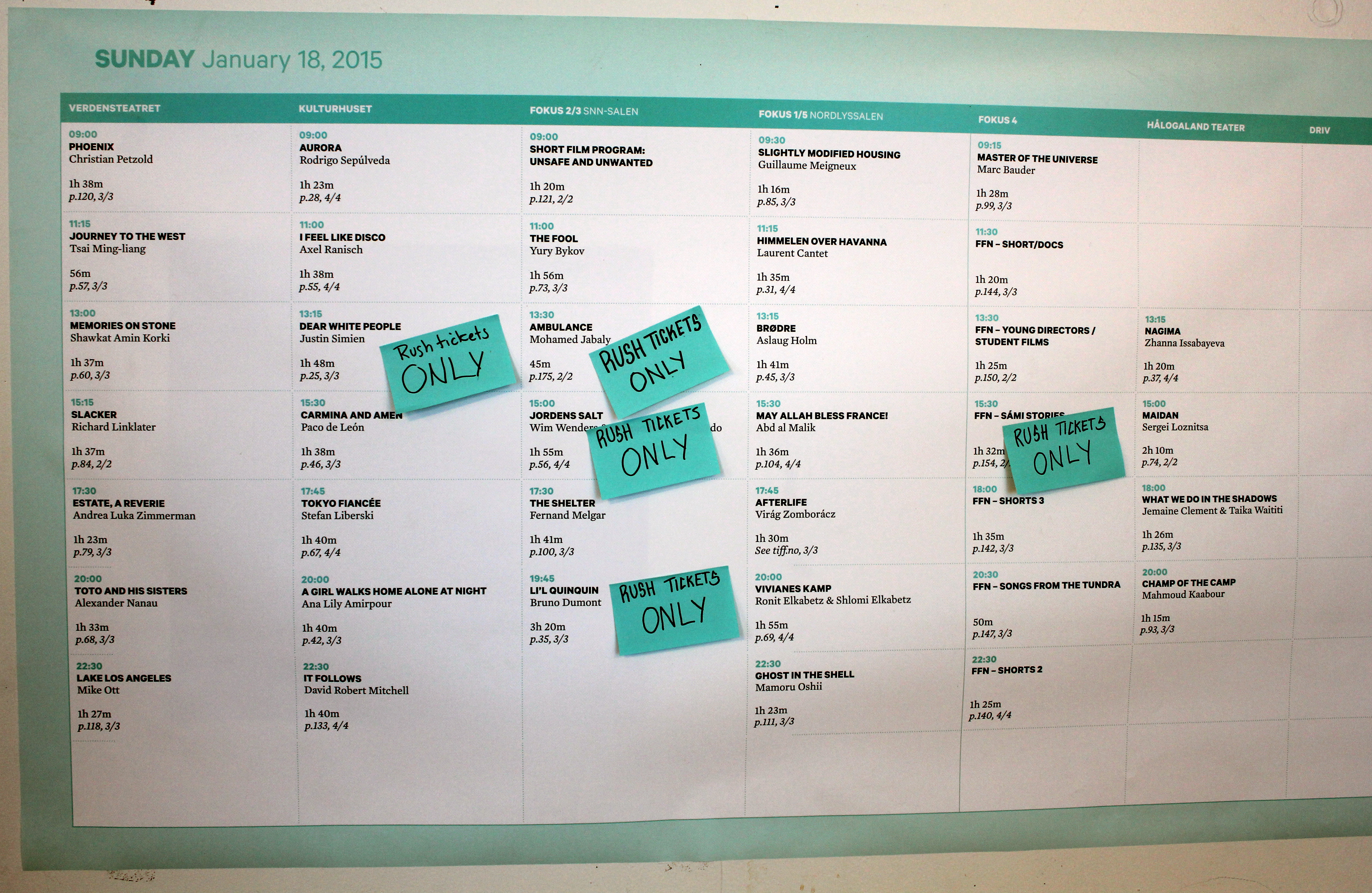
Information board

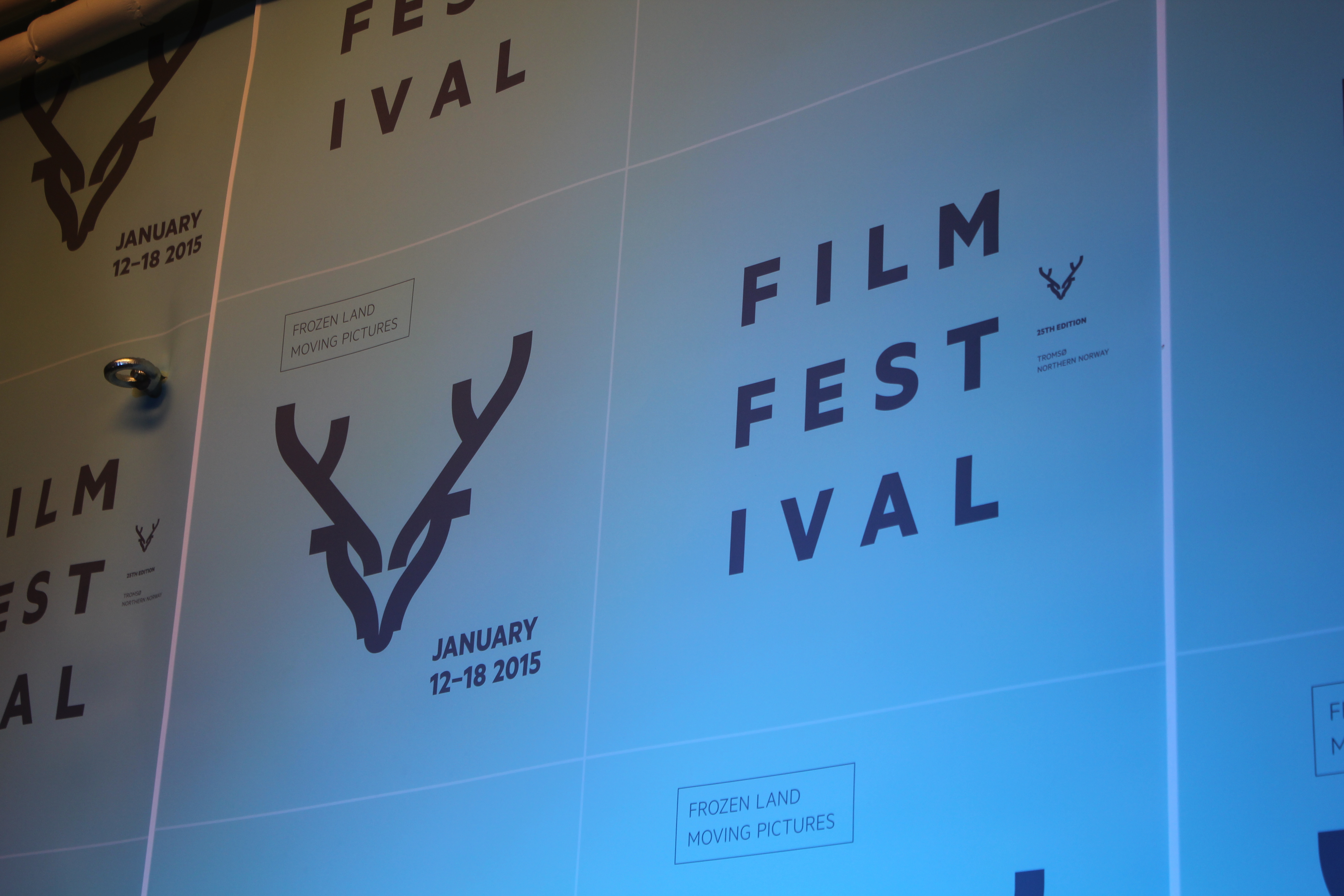
Festival logo on the wall in the ticket office

The Tromsø International Film Festival (TIFF) is an annual film festival held during the third week of January in Tromsø, Norway.

== History ==
The inaugural Tromsø International Film Festival (TIFF) was held in 1991.

== Description ==
TIFF is held each year during the third week of January in Tromsø.

TIFF has six screening venues, including Verdensteatret (Norway's oldest cinema in continuous use) and the Hålogaland Teater. Because the festival takes place toward the end the polar night, it also offers mid-day screenings in an outdoor cinema.

The total number of admissions in 2020 was 58500, which makes TIFF Norway's biggest film festival.

== Awards ==
The film festival presents several awards:

- The Aurora Prize: TIFF's main prize; films must have their Norwegian premiere at TIFF to compete
- The FIPRESCI Prize: an international critics' award, with jury members from FIPRESCI
- The Don Quixote Prize: awarded by the Federation internationale des cine-clubs
- The Norwegian Peace Film Award: awarded to a film spotlighting and encouraging understanding of violence
- The Tromsø Palm: awarded to the best short film under 60 minutes
- The Tromsø Audience Award
- The Faith in Film Award: awarded to a film which encourages reflection and critical thinking about religion

=== Aurora Award ===
- 2025: The 2025 Aurora Award was won by the Palestinian family drama Happy Holidays, written and directed by Scandar Copti.
- 2026: A Sad and Beautiful World

=== Audience Award ===
Film voted as best movie by popular vote.

Year	Film	Director	Country
1995	Spider and Rose	Bill Bennett	Australia
1996	Accumulator 1	Jan Svěrák	Czech Republic
1997	Palookaville	Alan Taylor	France
1998	Gadjo dilo	Tony Gatlif	Romania and France
1999	When the Light Comes	Stijn Coninx	Germany / Belgium / Netherlands / Norway
2000	Une Liaison Pornographique	Frédéric Fonteyne	Belgium / France / Switzerland / Luxembourg
2001	In July	Fatih Akın	Germany
2002	The Princess and the Warrior	Tom Tykwer	Germany
2003	The Sea	Baltasar Kormákur	Iceland
2004	The Return	Andrey Zvyagintsev	Russia
2005	As It Is in Heaven	Kay Pollak	Sweden
2006	Innocent Voices	Luis Mandoki	Mexico
2007	USA vs. Al-Arian	Line Halvorsen	Norway
2008	L'Orchestra di Piazza Vittorio	Agostino Ferrente	Italy
2009	Shooting the Sun (US title: The Storm in My Heart)	Pål Jackman	Norway
2010	For a Moment, Freedom	Arash T. Riahi	Austria / France / Turkey
2011	Black Swan	Darren Aronofsky	U.S.A.
2012	Play	Ruben Östlund	Sweden
2013	No	Pablo Larraín	Chile
2014	Of Horses and Men	Benedikt Erlingsson	Germany/Iceland
2015	The Salt of the Earth	Wim Wenders and Juliano Ribeiro Salgado	France, Italy og Brazil
2016	Rams	Grímur Hákonarson	Iceland and Denmark
2017	Sealers - One last hunt	Trude Berge Ottersen and Gry Elisabeth Mortensen	Norway
2018	Close-Knit	Naoko Ogigami	Japan
2019	Woman at war	Benedikt Erlingsson	Iceland
2020	Parasite	Bong Joon-ho	South Korea
2021	Ninjababy	Yngvild Sve Flikke	Norway
2022	Beans	Tracey Deer	Canada
2023	Let the River Flow (Ellos eatnu – La elva leve)	Ole Giæver	Norway
2024	The Remarkable Life of Ibelin	Benjamin Ree	Norway
2025	Touch	Baltasar Kormákur	Iceland
2026	Calle Málaga	Maryam Touzani	Marocco

== World premieres ==
Movies that have had their world premiere at Tromsø International Film Festival include:

- 2001 Cool and Crazy
- 2008 The Kautokeino Rebellion
- 2016 Doing good
- 2021 Ninjababy
- 2025 Everything Must Go
