= Benedikt Erlingsson =

Icelandic actor (born 1969)

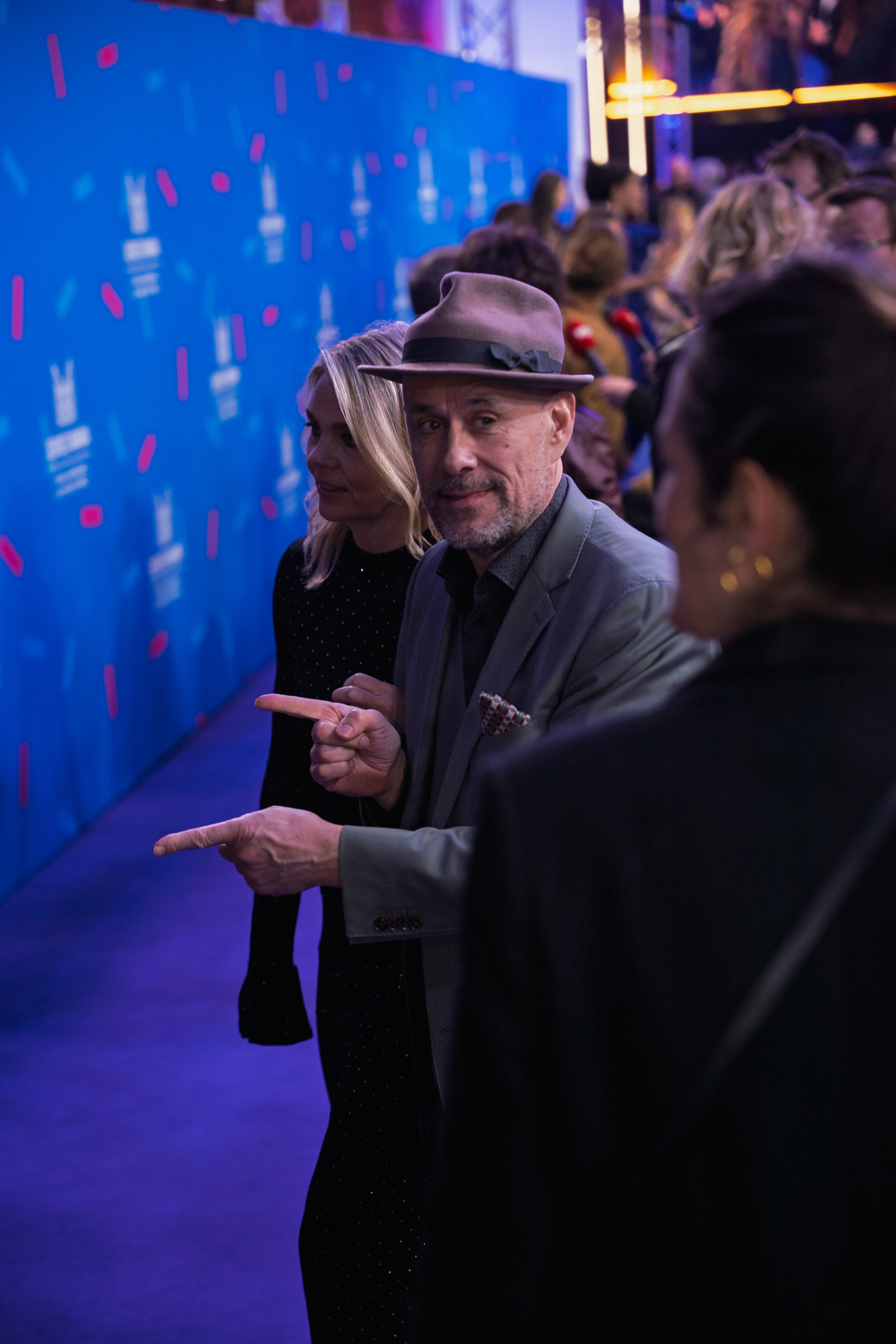
- Born: 31 May 1969 (age 57); Reykjavík, Iceland
- Occupations: Film director; screenwriter; actor
- Spouse: Charlotte Bøving
- Awards: Edda Award for Best Director

Benedikt Erlingsson (born 31 May 1969) is an Icelandic actor and theater and film director. He graduated from the Iceland Academy of the Arts in 1994 and has been with the National Theater of Iceland for most of his career. He has directed two feature-length films, both of which have won the Nordic Council Film Prize.

== Film and television career ==
Benedikt was a part of the locally renowned sketch comedy television show Fóstbræður.

Benedikt played the interpreter in Lars von Trier's 2006 film The Boss of It All, about an owner of an IT company that wishes to sell it after having pretended for years that the real boss lives abroad and communicates with the staff only by e-mail.

Benedikt's first feature-length film as director was Of Horses and Men in 2013. The film was selected as the Icelandic entry for the Best Foreign Language Film at the 86th Academy Awards, but it was not nominated. The film won the 2014 Nordic Council Film Prize, and won the audience award at the 2014 Tromsø International Film Festival in Norway. His second film, Woman at War, an eco-terrorism drama, premiered in 2018. It too was selected as the Icelandic entry for the Best Foreign Language Film at the Academy Awards for its release year, but it was likewise not nominated.

In 2021, Benedikt appeared as Steingrímur Hermannsson in the Icelandic television drama miniseries Blackport. He wrote, directed and acted in the upcoming TV show The Danish Woman.

== Theater career ==
Benedikt has directed four plays for the National Theater, including Iceland's Bell by Halldór Laxness.

== Personal life ==
In September 2025, Benedikt signed an open pledge with Film Workers for Palestine pledging not to work with Israeli film institutions "that are implicated in genocide and apartheid against the Palestinian people."
