= Woman at War =

2018 film directed by Benedikt Erlingsson

- Film poster
- Directed by: Benedikt Erlingsson
- Written by: Benedikt Erlingsson; Ólafur Egill Egilsson
- Produced by: Benedikt Erlingsson; Carine Leblanc; Marianne Slot
- Starring: Halldóra Geirharðsdóttir; Davíð Þór Jónsson; Magnús Trygvason Eliasen; Ómar Guðjónsson; Jóhann Sigurðarson
- Cinematography: Bergsteinn Björgúlfsson
- Edited by: Davíð Alexander Corno
- Music by: Davíð Þór Jónsson
- Release dates: 12 May 2018 (Cannes); 22 May 2018
- Running time: 101 minutes
- Countries: Iceland; France; Ukraine
- Languages: Icelandic; Spanish; English; Ukrainian
- Budget: $2.9 million
- Box office: $4.1 million

Woman at War (Icelandic: Kona fer í stríð, lit. 'Woman goes to battle', version in Ukrainian: «Гірська жінка: на війні», romanized: Girska zhinka: na viyni, lit. 'Highland Woman: at the War') is a 2018 Icelandic-Ukrainian comedy-drama film written, produced and directed by Benedikt Erlingsson, and starring Halldóra Geirharðsdóttir.

It premiered in the Critics' Week section at the 2018 Cannes Film Festival. It was released on 22 May 2018 to critical acclaim and selected as the Icelandic entry for the Best Foreign Language Film at the 91st Academy Awards ceremony, but it was not nominated.

== Premise ==
Halla, a choir conductor and eco-activist, plans to disrupt the operations of a Rio Tinto aluminium plant in the Icelandic highlands, purposely damaging electricity pylons and wires to cut their power supply.

One day, a long-forgotten application to adopt an orphan child from Ukraine is approved. At the same time, the government ramps up police and propaganda efforts in order to catch and discredit her. The film revolves around her attempts to reconcile her dangerous and illegal activism with the upcoming adoption. All the while, the film's soundtrack players, consisting of a three-man band and Ukrainian traditional singers, interacts with the plot and characters.

== Cast ==
- Halldóra Geirharðsdóttir as Halla / Ása
- Jörundur Ragnarsson as Baldvin
- Jóhann Sigurðarson as Sveinbjörn
- Juan Camilo Román Estrada as Juan
- Vala Kristin Eiriksdottir as Stefania
- Haraldur Stefansson as Gylfi Blöndal
- Jon Johanson as The Farmer
- Jón Gnarr as President of the Republic of Iceland
- Þórhildur Ingunn as Sírry
- Margaryta Hilska as Nika
- Hilmir Snær Guðnason as Taxi-guy

Galyna Goncharenko, Susanna Karpenko & Iryna Danyleiko plays the trio of Ukrainian singers. The band is played by Magnús Trygvason Eliassen (drummer), Omar Gudjonsson (sousaphonist) and Davíð Þór Jónsson (accordion & pianist).

== Accolades ==
Woman at War was screened at the 2018 Cannes Film Festival, in the Critics' Week section, where the screenwriters won the SACD award. The film won the Nordic Council Film Prize and the Lux prize award of the European Parliament for 2018.

It also was voted the audience award at the Tromsø International Film Festival in Norway in January 2019.

== Reception ==
On the review aggregator website Rotten Tomatoes, 97% of 117 critics' reviews are positive, with an average rating of 7.8/10. Metacritic, which uses a weighted average, assigned the film a score of 81 out of 100, based on 25 critics, indicating "universal acclaim".

Peter Bradshaw, for The Guardian, praised Halldóra Geirharðsdóttir's "attractive and sympathetic performance" as Halla, and called it a "well-turned, well-tuned" film that was "confidently and rather stylishly made".

Jay Weissberg, for Variety, called the film "a delightful follow-up to Of Horses and Men", and praised the director for "arranging beautifully shot picaresque episodes around a central figure who lives the ideals of the heroes, she has hanging on her wall, Mahatma Gandhi and Nelson Mandela".

== Remake ==
On 11 December 2018, it was announced that Jodie Foster was to direct and star in an English remake.

== See also ==
- List of submissions to the 91st Academy Awards for Best Foreign Language Film
- List of Icelandic submissions for the Academy Award for Best Foreign Language Film
