= Charlotte Bøving (actress) =

Danish actor and theatre director (born 1964)

- Born: 15 August 1964 (age 61); Aarhus, Denmark
- Occupations: Actor; theatre director
- Years active: 1999–present
- Spouse: Benedikt Erlingsson

Charlotte Bøving (born 15 August 1964) is a Danish actor and theatre director.

== Biography ==
Bøving was born in Aarhus, Denmark. She trained as an actress at Aarhus Theatre for four years, graduating in 1992. She later moved to Copenhagen, where she worked at Betty Nansen Teatret as well as Husets Teater. In 1995, she was awarded the Henkel Prize for Best Actress of the Year. She was nominated a Reumert Award for the Best Supporting Actress in 2004. She made her directorial and writing debut in 2004 when Den Kolde Jomfru was performed at Husets Teater. In 2005, Bøving moved to Reykjavík, Iceland, leaving Danish theater and instead opting for theater in Reykjavík, Iceland.

In 2001, Bøving played the role of Helle Bang in the television series Mit liv som Bent, which ran for ten episodes. She made her Icelandic film debut in 2013 with the film Of Horses and Men, playing the role of Solveig. The film received the Nordic Council Film Prize in 2014. Her second Icelandic film released in 2015, entitled Rams. Her English film debut came in 2015 when she played the role of Lene Gammelgaard in Everest.

== Filmography ==
=== Film ===
Year	Title	Role	Notes
1999	The One and Only	Nurse 2	uncredited
2006	Ørn	Leila/Louise	short film
2013	Of Horses and Men	Solveig	
2015	Rams	Katrin	
2015	Everest	Lene Gammelgaard	
2022	Bamse	Mor	

=== Television ===
Year	Title	Role	Notes
2001	Mit liv som Bent	Helle Bang	TV series

== Awards and nominations ==
Year	Award	Category	Work	Result	Ref.
1995	Henkel Prize	Best Actress of the Year		Won	
2004	Reumert Award	Female Supporting Actress of the Year	Verdens Ende	Nominated	
