= Dinosaurs of Tendaguru =

Tanzanian book for young readers on dinosaurs from East Africa

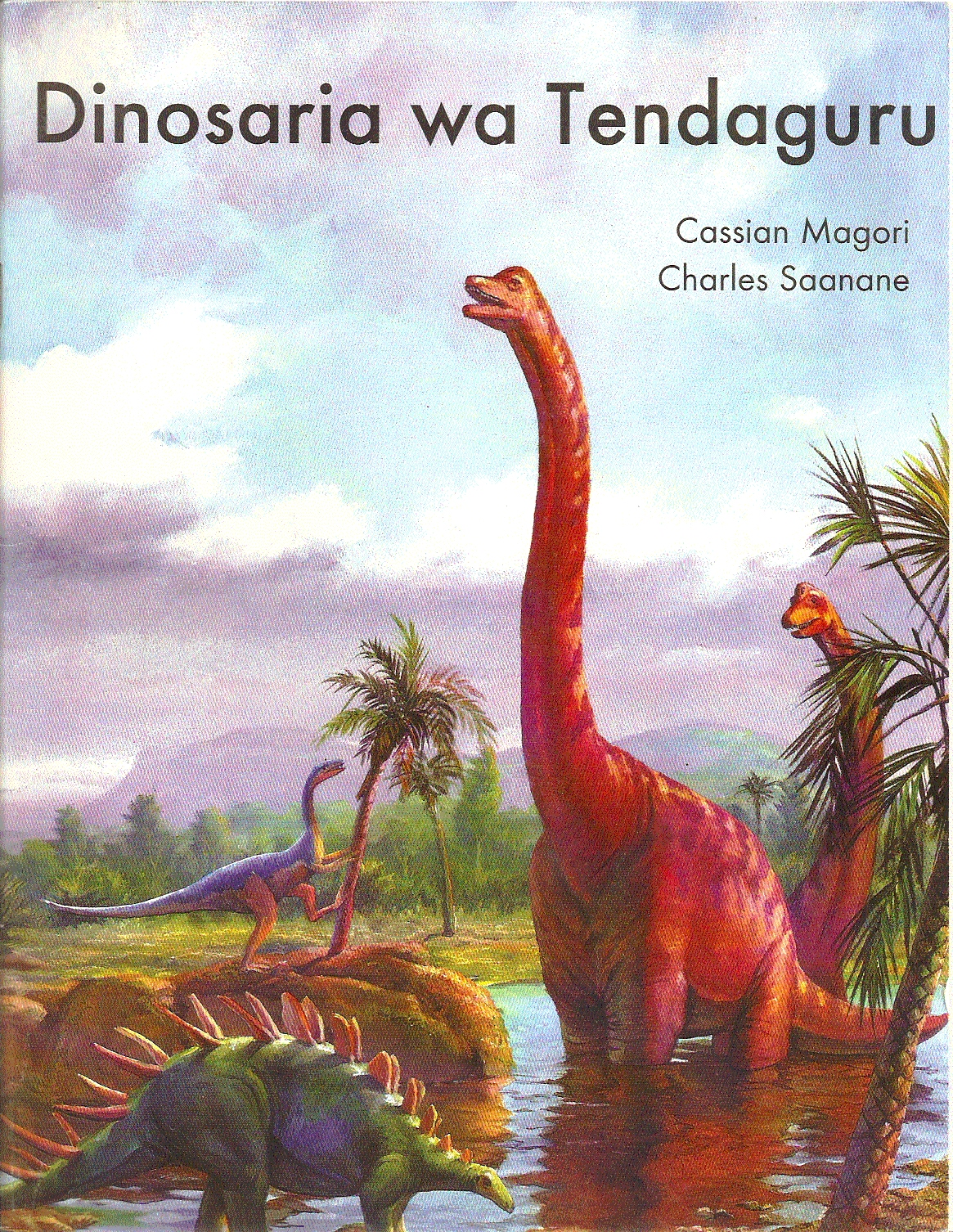
Title page of the booklet

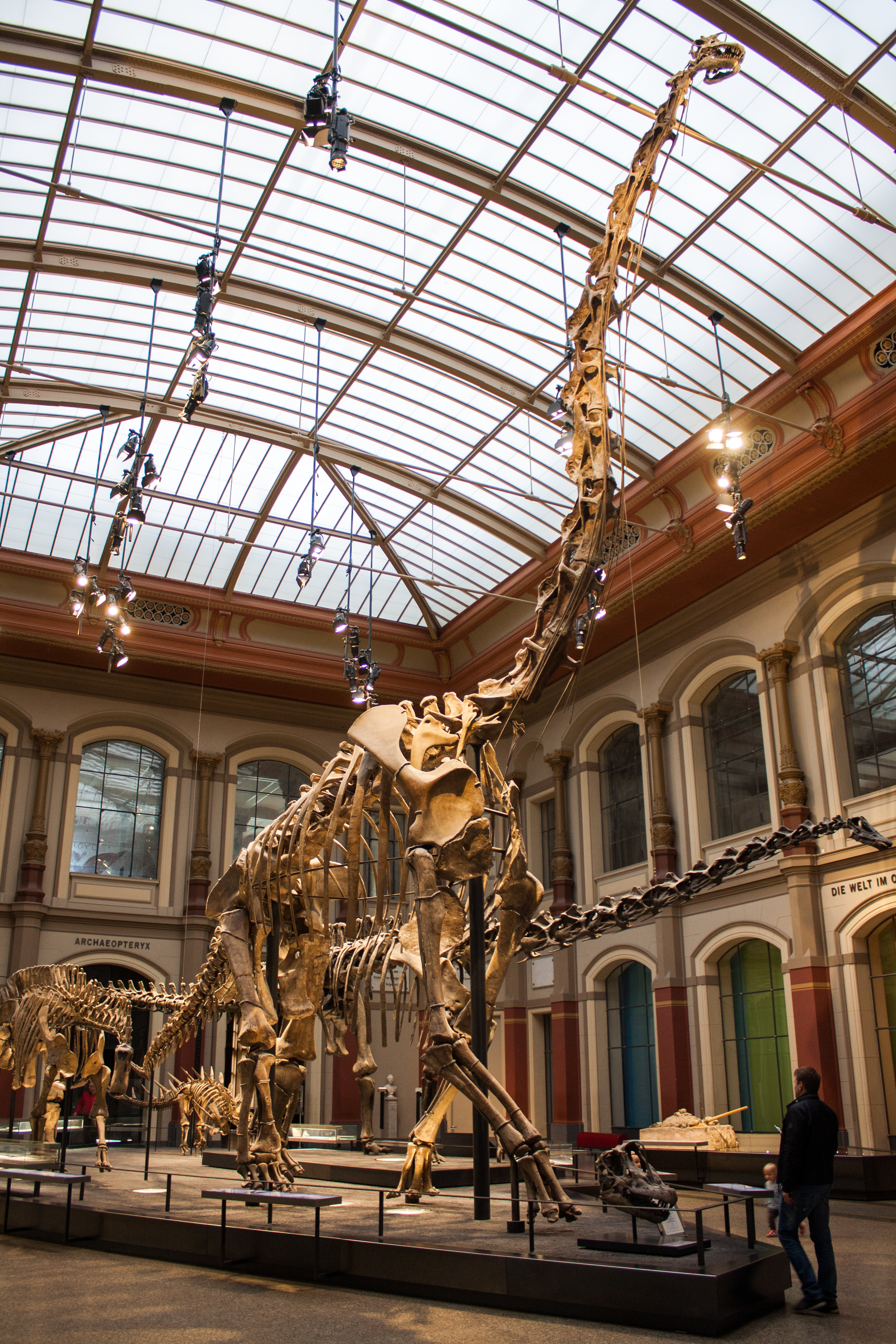
Reconstruction of Giraffatitan brancai in Museum for Natural History, Berlin

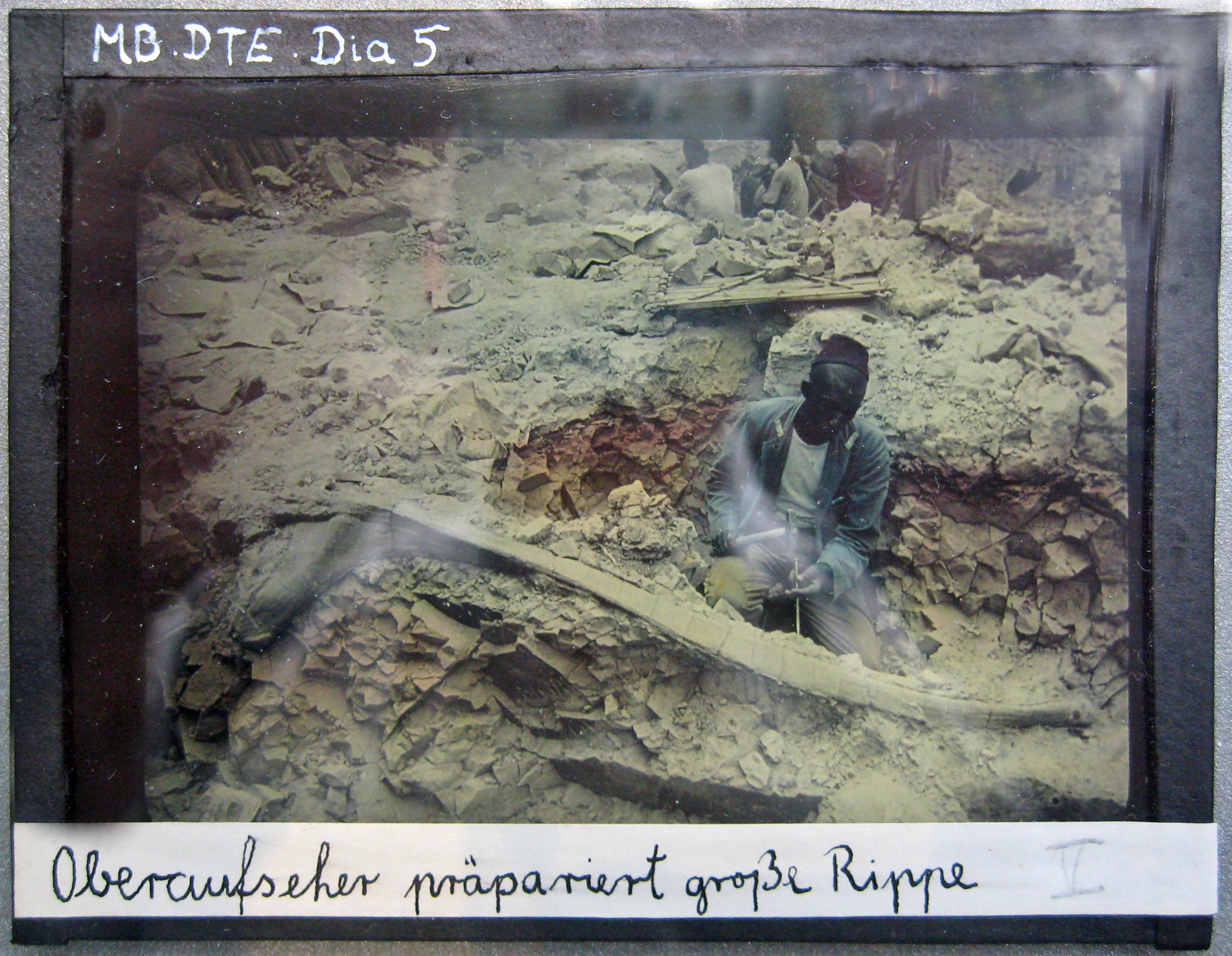
Tanzanian headman Mzee Boheti preparing a rib bone

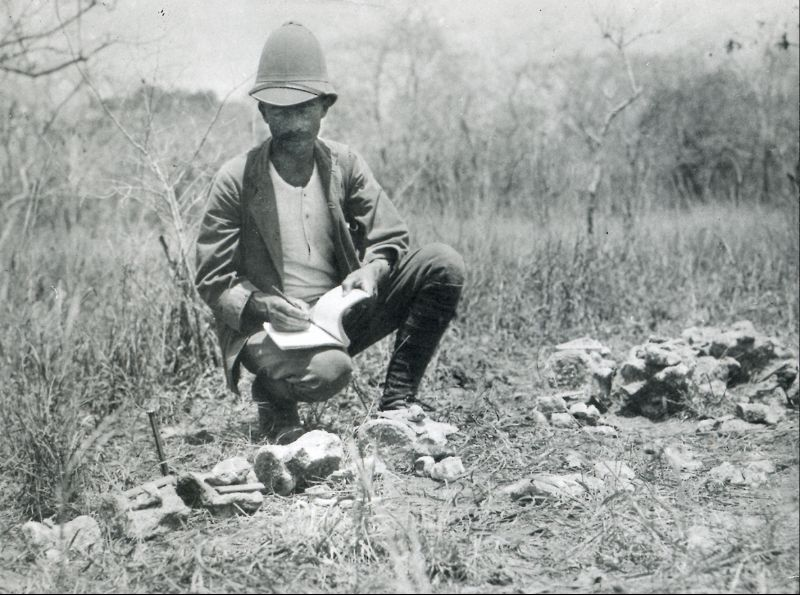
Paleontologist Werner Janensch on excavation in Tendaguru

Dinosaurs of Tendaguru (original title in Swahili: Dinosaria wa Tendaguru) is a Tanzanian booklet for young readers on natural history, focussing on the discovery and subsequent excavations of dinosaur fossils at Tendaguru hill in Lindi Region of South Eastern Tanzania between 1906 and 1913.

It was written in the country’s national language Swahili by Tanzanian authors Cassian Magori and Charles Saanane, with illustrations by the German graphic artist Thomas Thiemeyer. The booklet was published in 1998 with the support of the Goethe-Institut in Dar es Salaam, the local branch of the German cultural institute, by E&D Vision Publishing, Tanzania.

== Contents ==
Through its illustrations and a partially fictional story, the book tells the story of dinosaurs that lived approximately 150 million years ago in East Africa. Their skeletons were excavated between 1906 and 1913 in the former colony of German East Africa and until today represent the most important excavations of dinosaur fossils found in Africa. As the booklet is directed towards young readers in Tanzania, the authors invented a partially new narrative to set the story of the discovery, the subsequent excavations, and the scientific knowledge about natural history and the life of dinosaurs into a contemporary Tanzanian perspective. For the first time, this book presented thorough information about the excavations and the reconstructed skeletons of the dinosaurs that are exhibited in the Museum of Natural History in Berlin, Germany, to Tanzanian readers in their own language.

During several years, and under supervision of German natural scientists, 230 tons of excavation material containing fossil bones and other remnants of life 150 million years ago were packed into wooden boxes by African workers and carried to the nearby port of Lindi. From the excavation site at the Tendaguru Formation, they were shipped to Hamburg and, finally, to Berlin. Subsequently, scientists at the museum in Berlin reconstructed several skeletons of different dinosaur species, making the fossils of the Tendaguru formation one of the world’s most important collections for ongoing research. The exhibition’s highlight is an almost 14-metre-high skeleton of the species Giraffatitan, the largest dinosaur skeleton on display in the world.

Along with presenting scientific knowledge about the existence and environment of the dinosaurs, the presumed reasons for their extinction, and their classification into different species, the story of their discovery is here presented in a different way than in the historical German sources. Whereas the German excavation reports claim that the fossils were first found by a German mining engineer who was surveying the region of Tendaguru, the Tanzanian book attributes this discovery to a local farmer, a wise old man called Mzee Buheti, who by means of magical herbs supplied by his wife Mama Msomoe, is able to travel through time and space guided by a spirit. On one of his travels back millions of years, he comes across huge animals in the region of the Tendaguru hills. Upon his return through the millennia, he witnesses environmental changes that eventually lead to the extinction of the dinosaurs. By means of a time line reaching from the beginning of our universe to the present and showing pictures of different species, the reader is presented with short scientific information about the evolution of the dinosaurs and other species. By choosing the name of Buheti for their protagonist the authors referred to the historical Boheti bin Amrani who was the local "chief supervisor" (Oberaufseher) of more than 100 African workers involved in the excavations When in 1906, the German engineer Bernhard Sattler is surveying the region, it is Mzee Buheti who shows him the place where the fossils were found, thus prompting the excavations and their scientific exploration.

In order to present an adequate visual idea of the dinosaurs and their environment, Thomas Thiemeyer, a German illustrator specializing in this subject, created colour plates for both the presumed living conditions and the extinction of dinosaurs, and for the fictitious story of their discovery, told from a contemporary Tanzanian perspective. The text in Swahili was jointly written by the palaeontologist Charles Sanaane and the natural historian Cassian Magori of the University of Dar es Salaam, and edited for young readers by literary writer Bernard Mapalala.

== Aims of the book ==
As scientific research and presentations for the general public of these excavations had usually been published in German or English, very few Tanzanians knew about the existence and history of the fossils from Tendaguru before this book was published. Although the international discussion and demands for cultural cooperation and restitution of African cultural heritage from museums in Europe have become more prominent especially since the 2010s, Tanzania does not possess any biological specimens from Tendaguru, sufficient personal resources nor infrastructure to present dinosaur fossils in an adequate way. In order to make this important historical information accessible to a general local audience, the Goethe-Institut in Dar es Salaam suggested the story of the Tendaguru dinosaurs to the publishers of the book in 1998. - According to Elieshi Lema of E&D Vision Publishing, 4000 copies were produced with the financial help of a sponsor and distributed free of charge to Tanzanian secondary schools. In Kenya, the booklet was also approved as instructional material for primary schools and teacher training colleges. It has since been out of print, but copies exist in libraries in Sweden, Japan and in the United States.

== Reception ==
In 2009, paleontologist Gerhard Maier mentioned the booklet in his comprehensive study on the history of the excavations African Dinosaurs Unearthed: The Tendaguru Expeditions. He commented on the effect of this booklet as "a most welcome outcome (...) was the popularization of Tendaguru for the people of Tanzania."

In 2022, Dinosaria wa Tendaguru was mentioned in the report "Reclaiming restitution" by Open Restitution Africa, an Africa-led heritage project that referred to the Tendaguru fossils as a case study for the discussion on restitution of African cultural heritage.

In a 2024 chapter on how the Berlin Dinosaurs got their names, the German authors working for the Natural History Museum in Berlin described how excavation leaders Janensch and Hennig had recorded the work of several African workers at the excavation. This acknowledgement was based on the preliminary names for several specific fossil specimens, including "Abdallahsaurus", named after fossil preparator Sefu Abdallah, "Salimosaurus", named after the excavator Salim Tombali and "Mohammadisaurus", named after Mohammai Keranje. In the same article, the authors also referred to chief overseer Boheti bin Amrani, whose contribution to the excavation was recorded both in the field notes and photographs by Janensch. These specimen names bearing African names were only used in a prelimary way during the excavation of the fossils and later replaced by scientific names of the dinosaur genera.

At the same time, these temporary names can be seen as evidence of the respect that the German scientists had for the African preparators, and as a recognition of their work and achievements. They point to a temporary suspension of colonial hierarchies for the period in which the expedition’s leaders worked together in the field with local preparators and excavators.

— Holger Stoecker and Michael Ohl, Taxonomies at Tendaguru: How the Berlin Dinosaurs Got Their Names

== See also ==
- Tendaguru formation
- Dinosaurs
- List of African dinosaurs
