= Thomas Thiemeyer =

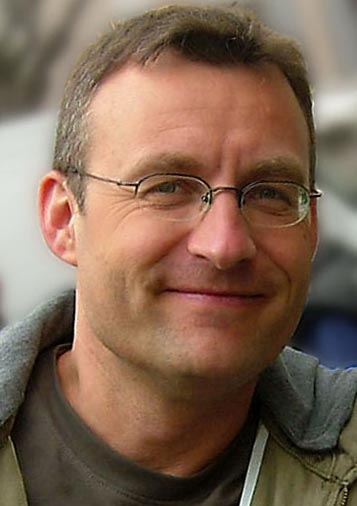
Thomas Thiemeyer

Thomas Thiemeyer (born 22 March 1963) is a German illustrator and author of fantasy novels. Since 2018, he also has published crime stories set in Corsica under the pen name Vitu Falconi.

Thiemeyer studied art and geology in Cologne. His first children's book was published in 1989 by the Ravensburger publishing house, where he also worked as graphic advisor. Two years later, he decided to become a freelance artist, illustrating games, children's books, book covers and much more.

Among other publishers, he has worked for Heyne Verlag, Arena, Fantasy Productions, Beltz & Gelberg, HarperCollins, Random House and Wizards of the Coast. In 2014, one of his paintings based on the biblical story of Noah was exhibited in an art show in New York City curated by the American film director Darren Aronofsky. In Germany, Thiemeyer's work was repeatedly awarded the Kurd-Laßwitz-Preis and the Deutscher Phantastik-Preis (a German Fantasy award).

In 2004, his debut novel Medusa published by Droemer Knaur became an international success. Many other novels both for adults as well as for young readers followed, some of them became bestsellers. His novels have been translated into English, Spanish, Dutch, Czech, Polish, Russian, Ukrainian, Korean, Italian, Turkish, Chinese, Portuguese as well as Slovenian.

His stories are set in the tradition of classic adventure novels and often deal with the discovery of ancient cultures, including supernatural threats by mysterious powers. - As he had previously illustrated a picture book on dinosaurs, Thiemeyer was invited in 1998 to draw pictures for a book for young readers in Tanzania on the dinosaurs of Tendaguru, the historic and most important discovery of dinosaur fossils in Africa.

Thomas Thiemeyer lives in Stuttgart, Germany, with his wife and two sons.

== Novels ==
Novels for readers of all ages:

- Medusa, Knaur publishers, Munich 2004, ISBN 9783948093006 and ASIN B07V49GRMD (English edition)

Researcher Hannah Peter makes a strange discovery: a Medusa sculpture, with snakelike extremities and a cyclops eye, indicates that there is a cave deep in the mountains, where a fantastically beautiful and incredibly dangerous object is located. A team from the National Geographic Society is assigned to search for this treasure. Along with Chris, the climatologist of the group, Hannah discovers the origin and at the same time the end of an age-old culture.

- Reptilia, Knaur publishers, Munich 2005, ISBN 978-3-426-63458-5 (German edition) and ASIN B07V498TVQ (English edition)

The young geneticist David Astbury is asked by a wealthy friend of his father's for help, as her daughter Emily has disappeared while on an expedition in the Congo. She was on a hunt for the legendary monster Mokèlé-mbèmbé, the sole survivor of the age of dinosaurs. Thus, David prepares to go into the depths of the jungle of the Congo. He is accompanied by a Congolese biologist and two foreign game hunters. When they seek out the ancient reptile at Lake Tele, strange events begin to unfold. The reptile holds a genetic secret, which could forever change the way of life on earth.

- Magma, Knaur publishing house 2007, ISBN 978-3-426-66213-7 (German edition) and ASIN B07WCQ8BNV (English edition)

Seismologist Dr. Ella Jordan gets the news that strange signals are being received in the middle of the Pacific Ocean. They are, however, much too regular to be caused by anything natural and seem to originate from the 10,000 meter deep Mariana Trench. Ella drops everything to join a team of researchers heading over there in the most advanced submarine in the world. Along with a Japanese crew, an attractive U.S. Marine officer, and a somewhat shady Swiss professor, Konrad Martin, Ella and her team descent to the deepest spot on earth and barely escape disaster: They find a gigantic, perfectly round stone that reacts to their probing with a deadly heat ray. What hardly anyone knows is that hidden away in the mountains of Switzerland, there is an underground lab, where scientists are working on a similar, though smaller ball of stone, found decades earlier next to the corpse of a geologist. Suddenly new signals are detected: first from the North Pole, then from Russia, Australia, and the Antarctic. Ella and Konrad Martin find these same inexplicable stone shapes everywhere. When the stones’ signals start to be sent in unison, the resulting seismic waves are so strong that they cause earthquakes and volcanoes, but that is just the beginning. A countdown to disaster begins, and Ella recognizes the terrible truth. The threat does not come from this world.

- Nebra, Knaur publishers 2009, ISBN 3-426-63850-9.

Around the Brocken in the Harz Mountains, towns and hotels are preparing for the Walpurgis Night, and archaeologist Hannah Peters is on her way. Her job is to explore the mysterious Nebra sky disk, a spectacular Bronze Age find. What she doesn't know: The disc is the object of desire of a dark cult, lurking in the caves of the Harz mountains, having waited for a long time to celebrate an all-destructive ritual. Hannah is drawn deeper and deeper into the force of the cult - and soon strange celestial phenomena announce a Walpurgis Night, that will never end.

- Korona, Knaur publishers 2010, ISBN 3-426-66291-4 (German edition)

Amy Walker, a biologist specializing on gorillas, has nightmares ever since a member of her team has mysteriously disappeared. Ironically, an ex-con is to join the team. Nobody - except the gorillas - trusts him. Despite threatening solar activity and strange weather phenomena, the team travels to the East African Rwenzori Mountains to locate the missing persons, and an adventure starts that takes Amy to the limits of her mind.

- Valhalla, Knaur Verlag, 2014, ISBN 978-3-426-65265-7 (German edition)
- Devil's River, Knaur publishers, 2015, ISBN 978-3-426-51715-4 (German edition)
- Babylon, Knaur publishers, 2016, ISBN 978-3-426-65363-0 (German edition)

Novels for young readers:

- Die Stadt der Regenfresser (The city of the rain eaters) Loewe publishing house, Bindlach 2009, ISBN 978-3-7855-6574-2
- Der Palast des Poseidon (The palace of Poseidon), Loewe publishing house, Bindlach 2010, ISBN 978-3-7855-6576-6and others

== Audiobooks ==
- Magma, AME Hören 2007, read by Johannes Steck, ISBN 978-3-938046-63-0
- The city of the raineaters, Jumbo 2009, read by Dietmar Wunder, ISBN 3-8337-2437-4
- Nebra, Argon 2009, read by Franziska Pigulla, ISBN 3-86610-720-X
- Korona, Argon 2010, read by Dietmar Wunder, ISBN 3-8398-1053-1
- The palace of Poseidon, Jumbo 2010, read by Dietmar Wunder, ISBN 3-8337-2612-1

== Awards/Prizes ==
- 1989 selection list to Deutscher Jugendliteraturpreis. "Das große Buch der Saurier" Ravensburger publishing house
- 1998 Kurd-Laßwitz-Preis for best envelope illustration. "Auf zwei Planeten" Heyne-Verlag
- 2002 Kurd-Laßwitz-Preis for best envelope illustration. "Quest" Heyne-Verlag
- 2003 Kurd-Laßwitz-Preis for best envelope illustration. "Jupiter" Heyne-Verlag
- 2004 Kurd-Laßwitz-Preis for best envelope illustration. "Asteroidenkrieg" Heyne-Verlag
- 2006 Kurd-Laßwitz-Preis for best envelope illustration. "Die Legende von Eden und andere Visionen" Shayol
- Deutscher Phantastik-Preis 2006
