= Argiles d'Octeville =

Geological formation in Normandy, France

- Stratigraphic range: Kimmeridgian
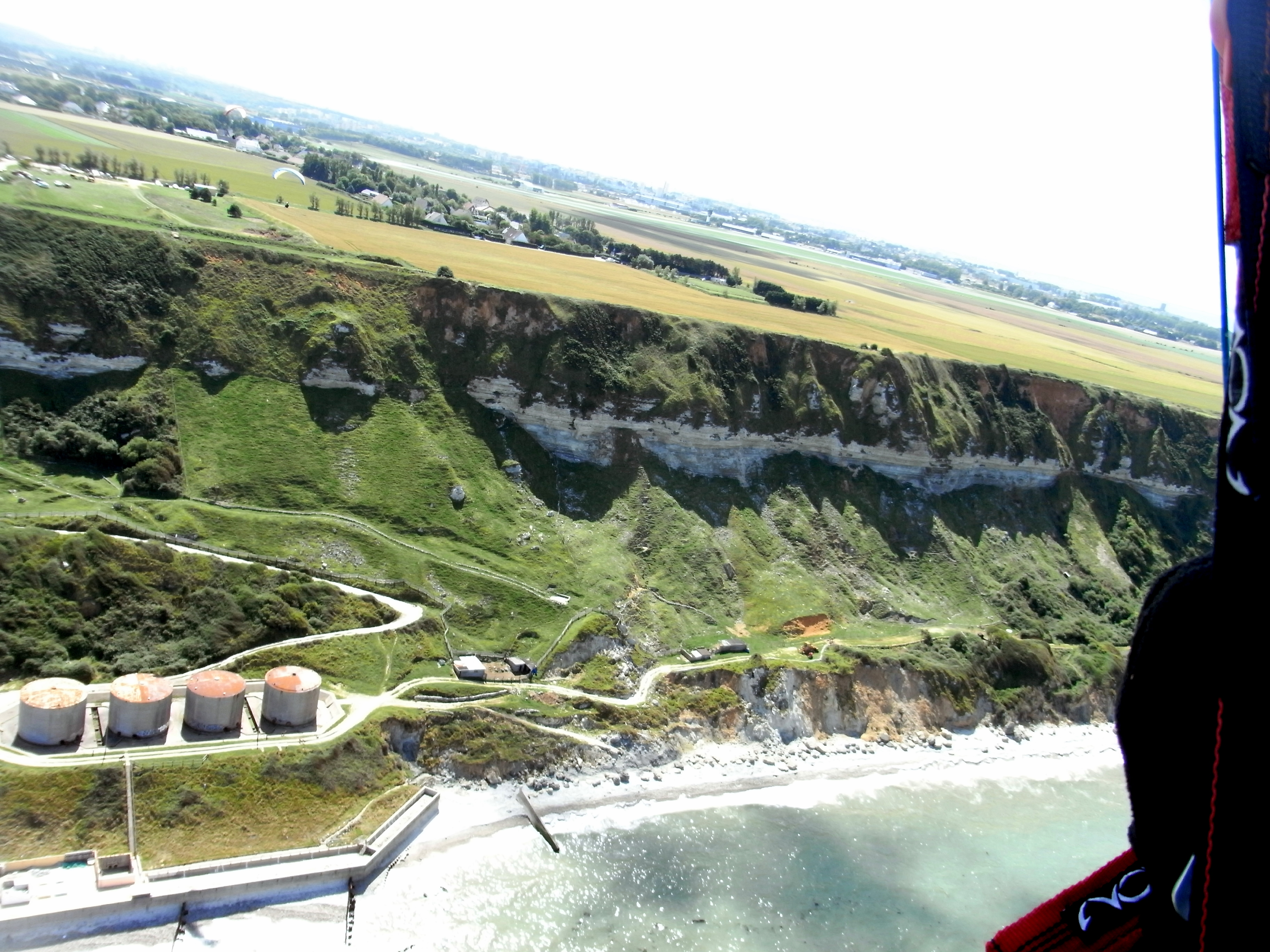
- Argiles d'Octeville exposed near the base of cliffs near Octeville-sur-Mer, with Chalk in the upper exposure
- Type: Geological formation
- Sub-units: Argiles du Croquet inférieures, Argiles du Croquet supérieures, Argiles d'Ecqueville inférieures, Argiles d'Ecqueville médianes, Argiles d'Ecqueville supérieures
- Underlies: Unconformity with Aptian sands
- Overlies: Marnes de Bleville
- Thickness: 34 metres

Lithology
- Primary: Claystone
- Other: Limestone

Location
- Region: Normandy
- Country: France

Type section
- Named for: Octeville-sur-Mer

The Argiles d'Octeville (meaning Octeville Clay) is a geological formation in Normandy, France. It dates back to the Kimmeridgian stage of the Late Jurassic. It is equivalent to the Kimmeridge Clay in England and predominantly consists of claystone, with some limestone. It is well exposed in cliff section at Cap de la Hève

== Vertebrate fauna ==
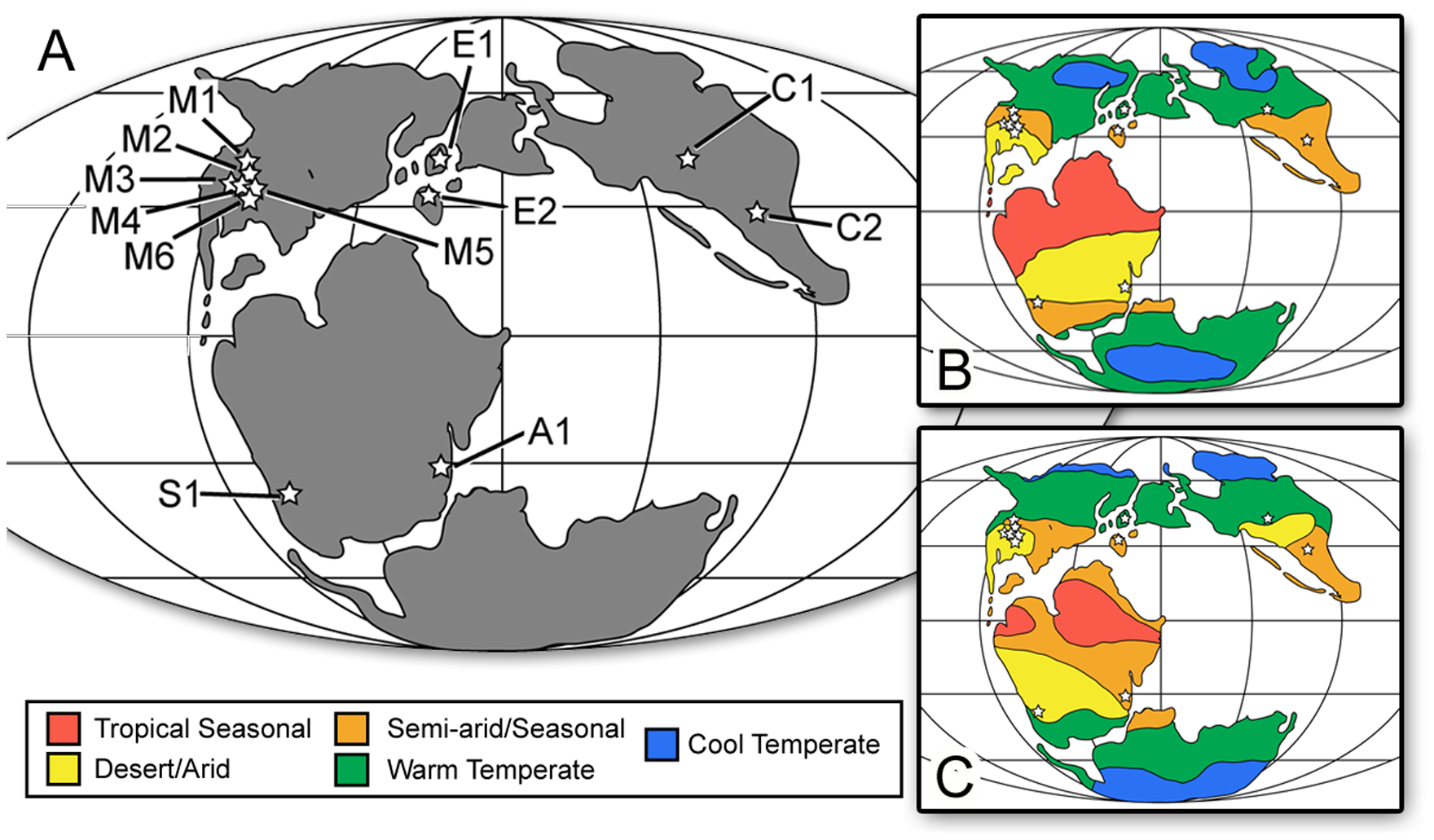
Dinosaur localities - E1: Argiles d'Octeville

Reptiles of the Argiles d'Octeville
Taxa	Species	Presence	Material	Notes	Images
Dacentrurus	Indeterminate	Cliffs of Octeville, Cap de La Hève, Normandy	"Seven cervical vertebrae, seven dorsal vertebrae, a sacrum with seven fused centra and sacral ribs, the left ilium, the posterior ends of one pubis and one ischium, the first caudal vertebra and one femur"	Dacentrurine Stegosaur. Excavated in 1898. First described as "Omosaurus lennieri" by Nopcsa in 1911 Remains destroyed by WW2 bombing in 1944.	Dacentrurus
Normannognathus	N. wellnhoferi	Cliffs of Octeville, Cap de La Hève, Normandy	Left anterior portion of the skull and associated lower jaws	Pterosaur, indeterminate Monofenestratan.	Dacentrurus
Sauropoda	Indeterminate	1. Geographically located in Departement de la Seine-Maritime, France.		1. "(=Pelorosaurus sp.)"	Dacentrurus

== See also ==
- List of dinosaur-bearing rock formations
