= Reptile (band) =

Band from Iceland

Reptile (Icelandic Risaeðlan) is a band from Iceland on the record label Bad Taste. Reptile is known for its over-the-top theatrics in their music, which combines pop with other instruments such as marimba, saxophone, banjo and violin. Their debut album Fame and Fossils was released in 1990. Reptile disbanded in 1992. Their label released a compilation CD called Efta! in 1996 under their Icelandic name, which includes newer songs recorded for a second album, earlier singles and b-sides and songs from Fame and Fossils.

== Members ==
Margrét Kristín Blöndal a.k.a. Magga Stina (vocals, violin)
Halldóra Geirharðsdóttir a.k.a. Dóra Wonder (saxophone, vocals, 1984–1990)
Ívar "Bongó" Ragnarsson (bass)
Þórarinn "Tóti" Kristjánsson (drums)
Sigurður Guðmundsson (guitar)
Margrét Örnólfsdóttir (keyboards, 1984–1988)
Hreinn Stephensen (accordion, guitar, 1990–1992)

== Discography ==
Fame and Fossils, 1990 (Reptile)
Efta!, 1996 (Risaeðlan)
Ivar Bongo EP,1989 (Risaeðlan)
