= Fossil Record =

- Discipline: Palaeontology
- Language: English
- Edited by: Carolin Haug, Christian Klug, Johannes Müller, Torsten Scheyer, Alexander Schmidt and Florian Witzmann

Publication details
- Former names: Mitteilungen aus dem Museum für Naturkunde in Berlin, Geowissenschaftliche Reihe
- History: 1998-present
- Publisher: Pensoft Publishers on behalf of the Museum für Naturkunde
- Frequency: Biannual
- Open access: Yes
- License: CC BY 4.0
- Impact factor: 2.0 (2025)

Standard abbreviations
- ISO 4: Foss. Rec.
- NLM: Mitt Mus Nat Berl Foss Rec

Indexing
- ISSN: 2193-0066 (print); 2193-0074 (web)
- LCCN: 2006238700
- OCLC no.: 891343714

Links
- Journal homepage; Online archive (2014-2021); Online archive (2022–present)

Fossil Record is a biannual peer-reviewed scientific journal covering palaeontology. It was established in 1998 as the Mitteilungen aus dem Museum für Naturkunde in Berlin, Geowissenschaftliche Reihe and originally published on behalf of the Museum für Naturkunde by Wiley-VCH. On 1 January 2022, Fossil Record changed publisher to Pensoft Publishers, the editor-in-chief is Florian Witzmann.

== Abstracting and indexing ==
The journal is abstracted and indexed in the Science Citation Index Expanded, BIOSIS Previews, The Zoological Record, and Scopus. According to the Journal Citation Reports, the journal has a 2020 impact factor of 2.081.
