= Reptilian =

Reptilian or reptilians may refer to:

- Reptiles, reptile-like creatures, or their qualities

== Arts and entertainment ==
- Reptilian (album), by Norwegian metal group Keep of Kalessin
- Reptilian (film), a 1999 South Korean kaiju remake
- Reptilians (Starfucker album)

== Other uses ==
- Reptilian complex, a brain theory
- Reptilian conspiracy theory, a fringe theory about shape-shifting aliens
- Reptilian humanoid, anthropomorphic reptiles in folklore
  - List of reptilian humanoids
