= Marnes de Bleville =

Geological formation in France

Marnes de Bléville
- Stratigraphic range: Kimmeridgian
- Type: Formation
- Sub-units: Lower, Middle and Upper Members
- Underlies: Argiles d'Octeville
- Overlies: Bancs de Plomb
- Thickness: 6 to 12 metres

Lithology
- Primary: Limestone, Marlstone

Location
- Region: Normandy
- Country: France

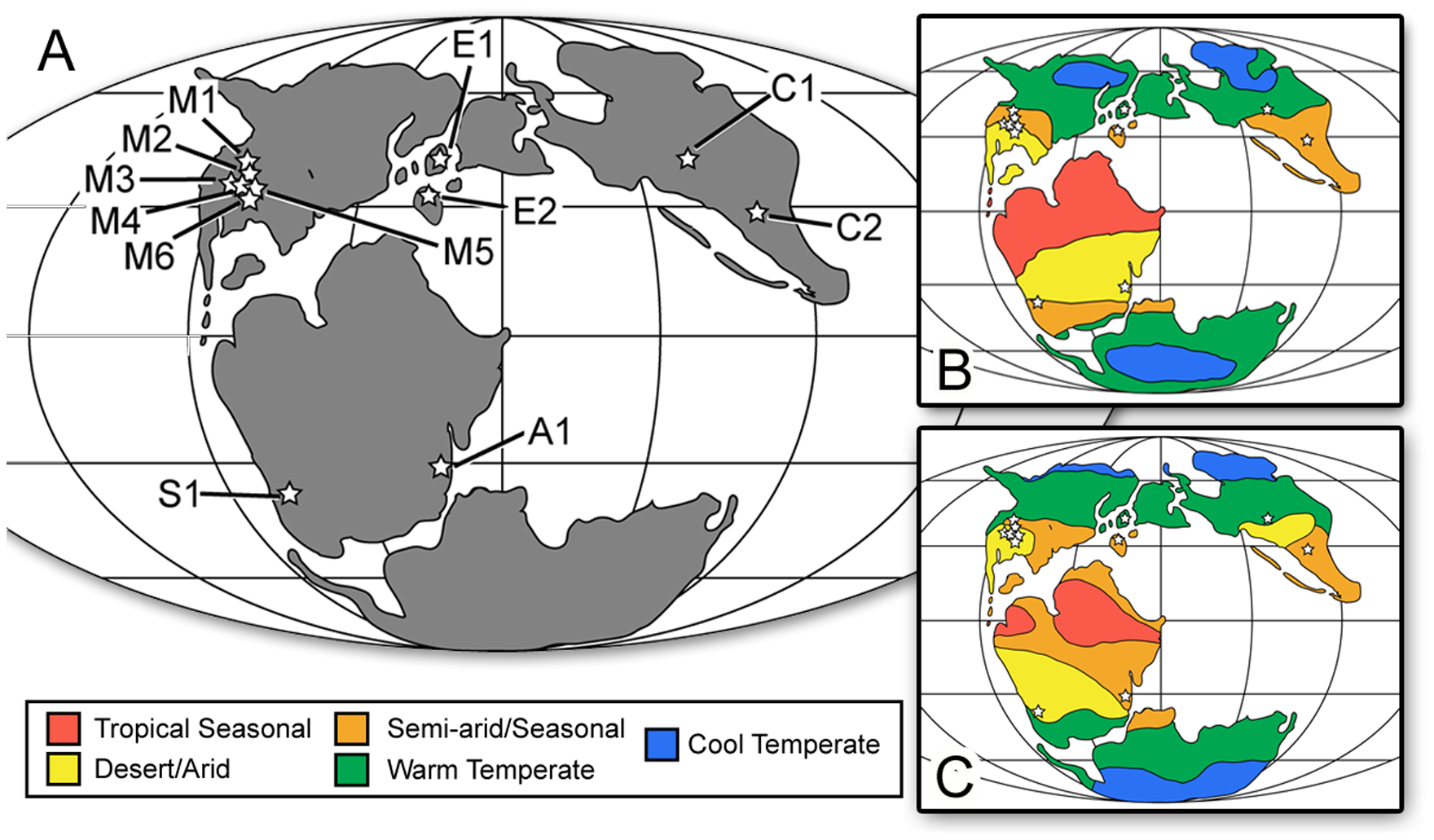
Dinosaur localities. E1 - Marnes de Bléville.

The Marnes de Bleville is a geological formation in France. It dates back to the Late Jurassic.

== Vertebrate fauna ==
Dinosaurs of the Marnes de Bleville
Taxa	Presence	Description	Images
Dryosauridae indet.	Middle Member, Cap de la Hève, Octeville	Remains consist of an isolated femur, formerly referred to Dryosaurus	

== See also ==
- List of dinosaur-bearing rock formations
