= Of Horses and Men =

2013 film

- Film poster
- Directed by: Benedikt Erlingsson
- Written by: Benedikt Erlingsson
- Produced by: Friðrik Þór Friðriksson, Christoph Thoke
- Starring: Ingvar Eggert Sigurðsson; Charlotte Bøving; Steinn Ármann Magnússon; Helgi Björnsson; Kjartan Ragnarsson; Atli Rafn Sigurðsson; Juan Camillo Roman Estrada; Sigríður María Egilsdóttir
- Release date: 28 August 2013
- Running time: 90 minutes
- Country: Iceland
- Language: Icelandic

Of Horses and Men (Icelandic: Hross í oss) is a 2013 Icelandic drama film written and directed by Benedikt Erlingsson and produced by fellow director Friðrik Þór Friðriksson.

The film was selected as the Icelandic entry for the Best Foreign Language Film at the 86th Academy Awards, but it was not nominated. The film won the 2014 Nordic Council Film Prize. In 2014, it won the audience award at the Tromsø International Film Festival in Norway.

== Plot ==
In a remote Icelandic valley, there is not much to do other than observe the horses, the neighbors, and the neighbors' horses with binoculars. Undisturbed, the stallions and mares do what nobody else in the valley dares to even talk about: love. However, there is still a feeling of love among some of the valley dwellers. Kolbeinn and Solveig's attempts at love are the subject of much interest for the valley dwellers.

Meanwhile, Vernhardur, who has a weakness for liquor, makes a name for himself on a Russian fishing vessel with the sailor Gengis. There is often disagreement about the riding routes between Grimur and Egill; Grimur generally prefers the classic routes on horseback, whereas Egill prefers riding through rough terrain on his tractor. Jóhanna, on the other hand, has nothing to say concerning her mare Raudka. One day, she encounters an injured old man. The religious Juan Camillo is seeking God on a high spiritual level.

Above all, all the people in the valley share a love of their horses, and eventually come to understand one another.

== Cast ==
- Helgi Björnsson
- Charlotte Bøving
- Sigríður María Egilsdóttir
- Maria Ellingsen
- Juan Camillo Roman Estrada
- Halldóra Geirharðsdóttir
- Erlingur Gíslason
- Kristbjörg Kjeld
- Steinn Ármann Magnússon
- Kjartan Ragnarsson
- Atli Rafn Sigurðsson
- Ingvar Eggert Sigurðsson

== Reception ==
The film holds an approval rating of 100% on Rotten Tomatoes based on 31 reviews, with an average rating of 7.60 out of 10. The site's critics' consensus reads: "Well-crafted and resoundingly original, Of Horses and Men is as intelligent, inscrutable, and breathtakingly lovely as its titular equines."

Robbie Collin described Of Horses and Men as a "collection of six-or-so interlocking fables about a group of rural Icelanders’ relationships with their horses and each other, and which run the gamut from stony-black comedies of sex and death to chilly meditations on the blind cruelty of fate." He gave it four stars out of five and called it "something truly and seductively strange" and "tenderly attuned to the weather and landscape, both of which are captured in you-could-almost-be-there vividness, and underscored by a heady swirl of choral works and primal drumming."

The Nordic Council Film Prize award committee praised the film as “strikingly original” and deeply rooted “in the laconic humour of the Icelandic saga tradition”.

== See also ==
- List of films with a 100% rating on Rotten Tomatoes
- List of films about horses
- List of submissions to the 86th Academy Awards for Best Foreign Language Film
- List of Icelandic submissions for the Academy Award for Best Foreign Language Film
