= Halldóra Geirharðsdóttir =

Icelandic actress (born 1968)

- Born: 12 October 1968 (age 56); Reykjavík, Iceland
- Occupations: Actress; musician
- Children: 5

Halldóra Geirharðsdóttir (born 12 October 1968) is an Icelandic actress and musician. In the 1990s, she was also a saxophonist and vocalist of the group Reptile.

== Biography ==
Halldóra graduated from the Iceland University of the Arts in 1995. From 1984 to 1990, she was part of the group Reptile where she was a saxophonist and vocalist. She is also known for portraying the clown Barbara.

In 2018, Halldóra starred in Woman at War, which has been recognized especially internationally with various awards. She portrayed the double role of Halla and her twin sister Ása. Woman at War is a film in which feminism, parenting and environmental activism intersect through the story of her character, that of a 50-year-old single and independent singing teacher who declares war on the local aluminum industry that is polluting her country. The film won awards such as the Lux Prize and the Grand Audience Award at the 2018 Seville Film Festival.

== Personal life ==
Halldóra has five children, and three grandchildren. She had her first daughter when she was 20 years old, her youngest in 2019 was 12 years old.

Halldóra is a regular UNICEF collaborator with whom she has traveled to Africa, Peru, Uganda, Haiti and Ecuador.
