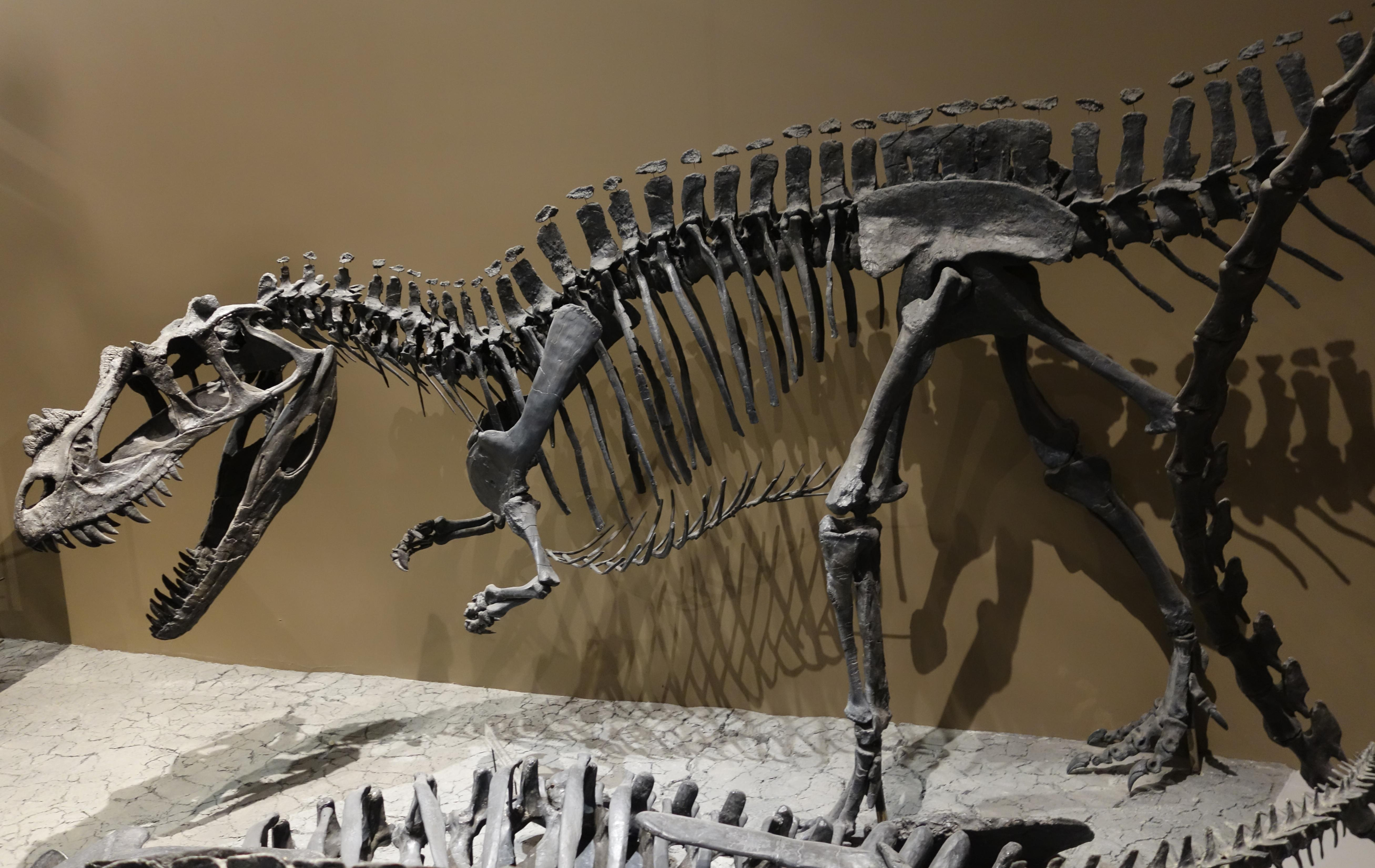
- Cast of a Ceratosaurus skeleton from the Cleveland Lloyd Quarry, on display at the Natural History Museum of Utah

Scientific classification
- Kingdom: Animalia
- Phylum: Chordata
- Class: Reptilia
- Clade: Dinosauria
- Clade: Saurischia
- Clade: Theropoda
- Family: †Ceratosauridae
- Genus: †Ceratosaurus; Marsh, 1884

Type species
- †Ceratosaurus nasicornis Marsh, 1884

Other species
- †?C. dentisulcatus Madsen & Welles, 2000; †?C. magnicornis Madsen & Welles, 2000

Synonyms
- Megalosaurus nasicornis (Marsh, 1884) [originally Ceratosaurus]; Labrosaurus sulcatus Marsh, 1896

= Ceratosaurus =

Ceratosaurus Temporal range: Late Jurassic, Kimmeridgian–Tithonian

Genus of theropod dinosaur from the Late Jurassic period

Ceratosaurus /ˌsɛrətoʊˈsɔːrəs/ (from Greek κέρας / κέρατος keras / keratos 'horn' and σαῦρος sauros 'lizard') is a genus of carnivorous theropod dinosaur that lived during the Late Jurassic period (around 155 m.y.a) in North America and Europe. The genus was first described in 1884 by American paleontologist Othniel Charles Marsh based on a nearly complete skeleton discovered in Garden Park, Colorado, in rocks belonging to the Morrison Formation. The type species is Ceratosaurus nasicornis.

The Garden Park specimen remains the most complete skeleton known from the genus and only a handful of additional specimens have been described since. Two additional species, Ceratosaurus dentisulcatus and Ceratosaurus magnicornis, were described in 2000 from two fragmentary skeletons from the Cleveland-Lloyd Quarry of Utah and from the vicinity of Fruita, Colorado. These species are no longer accepted by most paleontologists, and all three skeletons possibly represent different growth stages of the same species. In 1999, the discovery of the first juvenile specimen was reported. In 2000, a partial specimen was excavated and described from the Lourinhã Formation of Portugal, providing evidence for the presence of the genus outside of North America. Fragmentary remains have also been reported from Tanzania, Uruguay, and Switzerland, although their assignment to Ceratosaurus is currently not accepted by most paleontologists.

Ceratosaurus was a medium-sized theropod. The original specimen is estimated to be 5.3 m (17 ft) or 5.69 m (18.7 ft) long, while the specimen described as C. dentisulcatus was larger, at around 7 m (23 ft) long. Ceratosaurus was characterized by deep jaws that supported proportionally very long, blade-like teeth, a prominent, ridge-like horn on the midline of the snout, and a pair of horns over the eyes. The forelimbs were very short, but remained fully functional. The hand had four fingers with claws on the first three. The tail was deep from top to bottom. A row of small osteoderms (skin bones) was present down the middle of the neck, back, and tail. Additional osteoderms were present at unknown positions on the animal's body.

Ceratosaurus gives its name to Ceratosauria, a clade of theropod dinosaurs that diverged early on from the evolutionary lineage leading to modern birds. Within Ceratosauria, some paleontologists proposed it to be most closely related to Genyodectes from Argentina, which shares the strongly elongated teeth. The geologically older genus Proceratosaurus from England, although originally described as a presumed antecedent of Ceratosaurus, was later found to be an early tyrannosauroid. Ceratosaurus shared its habitat with other large theropod genera, including Torvosaurus and Allosaurus, and it has been suggested that these theropods occupied different ecological niches to reduce competition. Ceratosaurus may have preyed upon plant-eating dinosaurs; while some paleontologists suggested that it hunted aquatic prey such as fish, this has been rejected by more recent studies. The nasal horn was probably not used as a weapon as was originally suggested by Marsh, but more likely was used solely for display.

== History of discovery ==
=== Holotype specimen of C. nasicornis ===
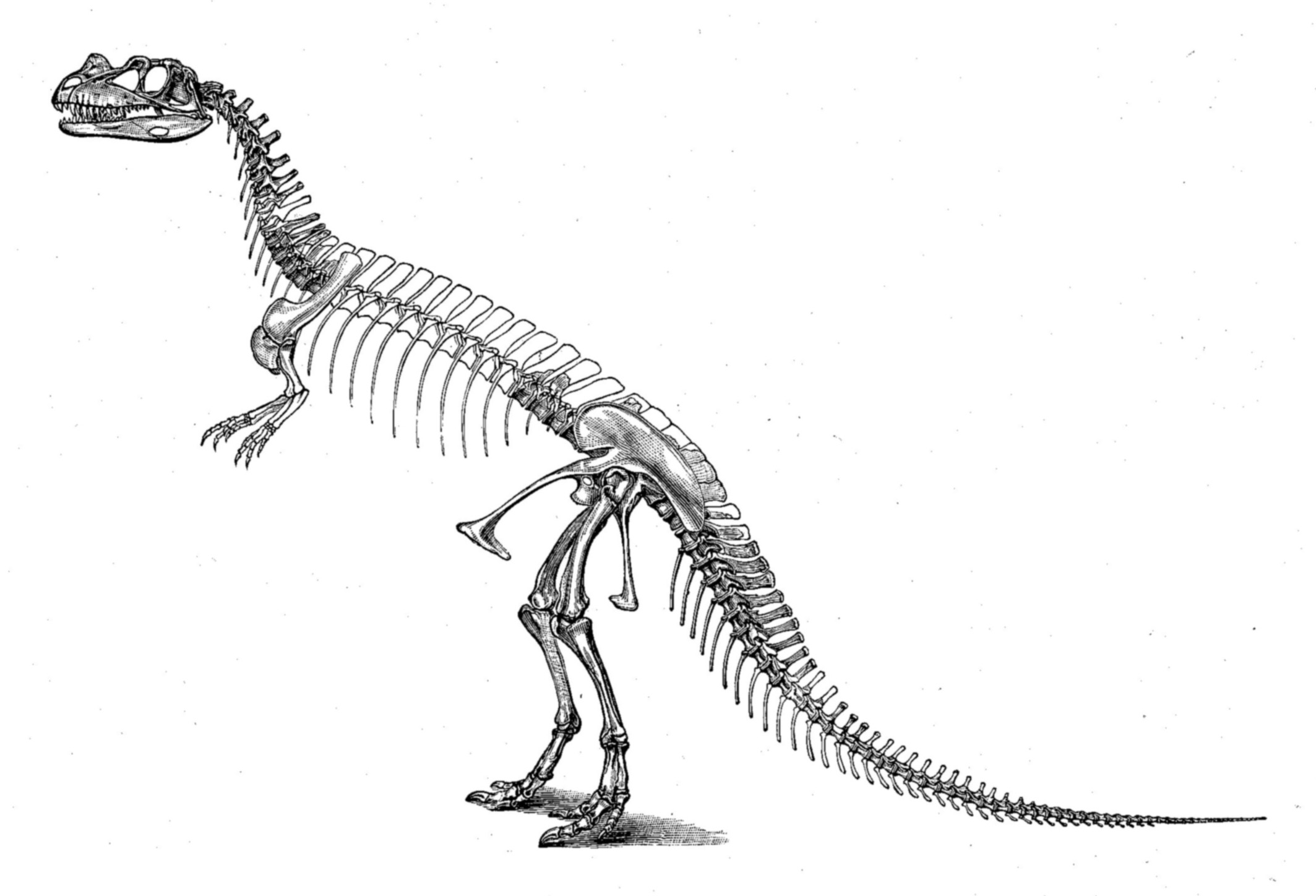
C. nasicornis skeleton restoration by Othniel Charles Marsh from 1896, depicted in an erroneous upright position and with excess vertebrae in the spine resulting in an overly elongated trunk

The first specimen, holotype USNM 4735, was discovered and excavated by farmer Marshall Parker Felch in 1883 and 1884. Found in articulation, with the bones still connected to each other, it was nearly complete, including the skull. Significant missing parts include an unknown number of vertebrae, all but the last ribs of the trunk, the humeri (upper arm bones), the distal finger bones of both hands, most of the right arm, most of the left leg, and most of the feet. The specimen was found encased in hard sandstone, leading to the skull and spine being heavily distorted during fossilization. The site of discovery, located in the Garden Park area north of Cañon City, Colorado, and known as the Felch Quarry, is regarded as one of the richest fossil sites of the Morrison Formation. Numerous dinosaur fossils had been recovered from this quarry even before the discovery of Ceratosaurus, most notably a nearly complete specimen of Allosaurus (USNM 4734) in 1883 and 1884.

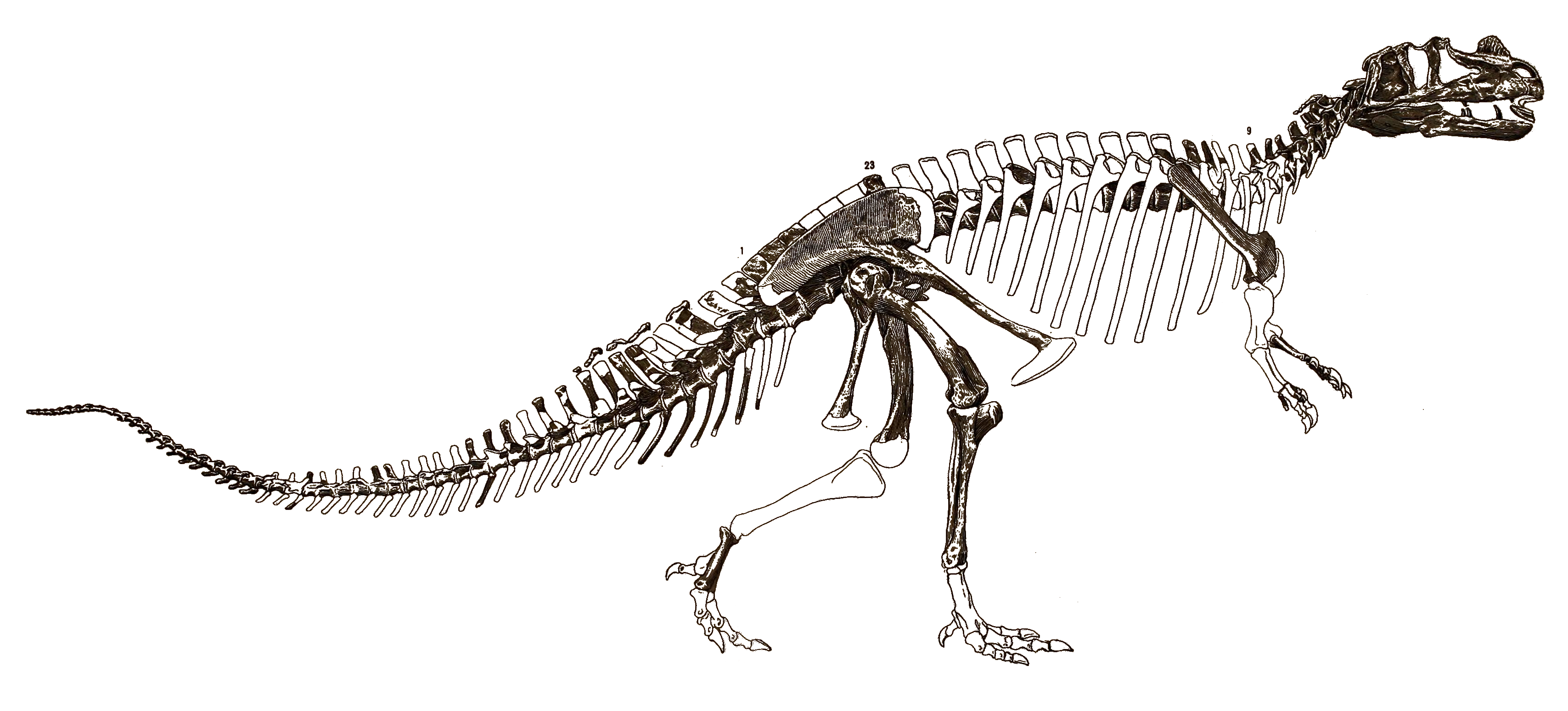
Reconstruction of the holotype specimen of C. nasicornis by Charles W. Gilmore, 1920, showing known elements

After excavation, the specimen was shipped to the Peabody Museum of Natural History in New Haven, where it was studied by Marsh, who described it as the new genus and species Ceratosaurus nasicornis in 1884. The name Ceratosaurus may be translated as "horn lizard" (from the Greek words κερας / κερατος, keras / keratos—"horn" and σαυρος/sauros—"lizard") and nasicornis with "nose horn" (from the Latin words nasus—"nose" and cornu—"horn"). Given the completeness of the specimen, the newly described genus was, at the time, the best-known theropod discovered in America. In 1898 and 1899, the specimen was transferred to the National Museum of Natural History in Washington, DC, along with many other fossils originally described by Marsh. Only part of this material was fully prepared when it arrived in Washington. Subsequent preparation lasted from 1911 to the end of 1918. Packaging and shipment from New Haven to Washington caused some damage to the Ceratosaurus specimen. In 1920, Charles Gilmore published an extensive redescription of this and the other theropod specimens received from New Haven, including the nearly complete Allosaurus specimen recovered from the same quarry.

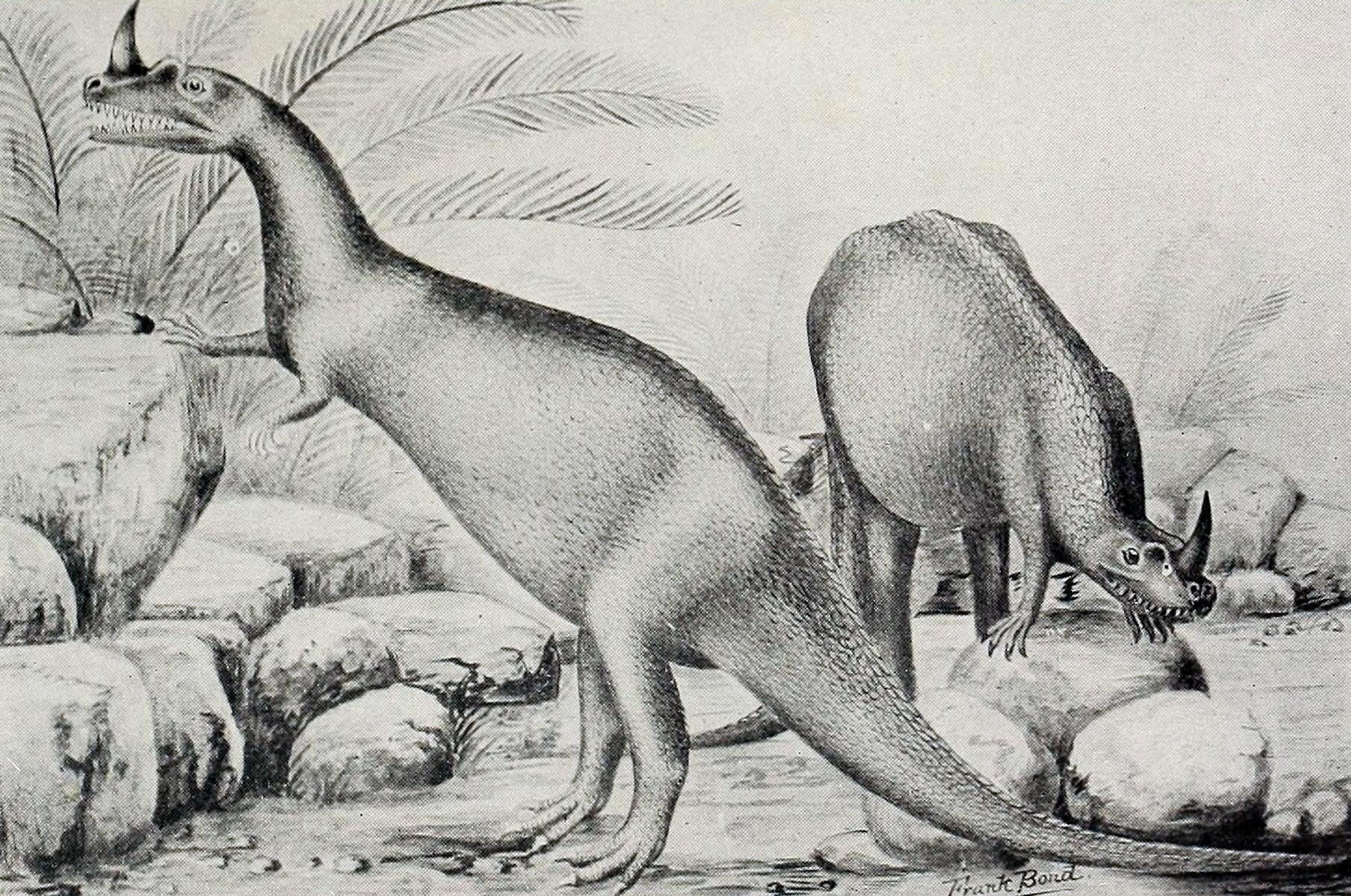
Probably the first life restoration of Ceratosaurus, drawn in 1899 by Frank Bond under the guidance of Charles R. Knight, but not published until 1920

In an 1892 paper, Marsh published the first skeletal reconstruction of Ceratosaurus, which depicts the animal at 22 ft (6.7 m) in length and 12 ft (3.7 m) in height. As noted by Gilmore in 1920, the trunk was depicted much too long in this reconstruction, incorporating at least six dorsal vertebrae too many. This error was repeated in several subsequent publications, including the first life reconstruction, which was drawn in 1899 by Frank Bond under the guidance of Charles R. Knight, but not published until 1920. A more accurate life reconstruction, published in 1901, was produced by Joseph M. Gleeson, again under Knight's supervision. The holotype was mounted by Gilmore in 1910 and 1911. Since then, it was exhibited at the National Museum of Natural History. Most early reconstructions show Ceratosaurus in an upright posture, with the tail dragging on the ground. Gilmore's mount of the holotype, in contrast, was ahead of its time. Inspired by the thigh bones, which were found angled against the lower leg, he depicted the mount as a running animal with a horizontal posture and a tail that did not make contact with the ground. Because of the strong flattening of the fossils, Gilmore did not mount the specimen as a free-standing skeleton but as a bas-relief within an artificial wall. With the bones being partly embedded in a plaque, scientific access was limited. In the course of the renovation of the museum's dinosaur exhibition between 2014 and 2019, the specimen was dismantled and freed from the encasing plaque. In the new exhibition, the original skeleton was replaced by a free-standing cast that is lying on its back fighting a Stegosaurus. The original bones are stored in the museum collection to allow full access for scientists.

=== Additional finds in North America ===
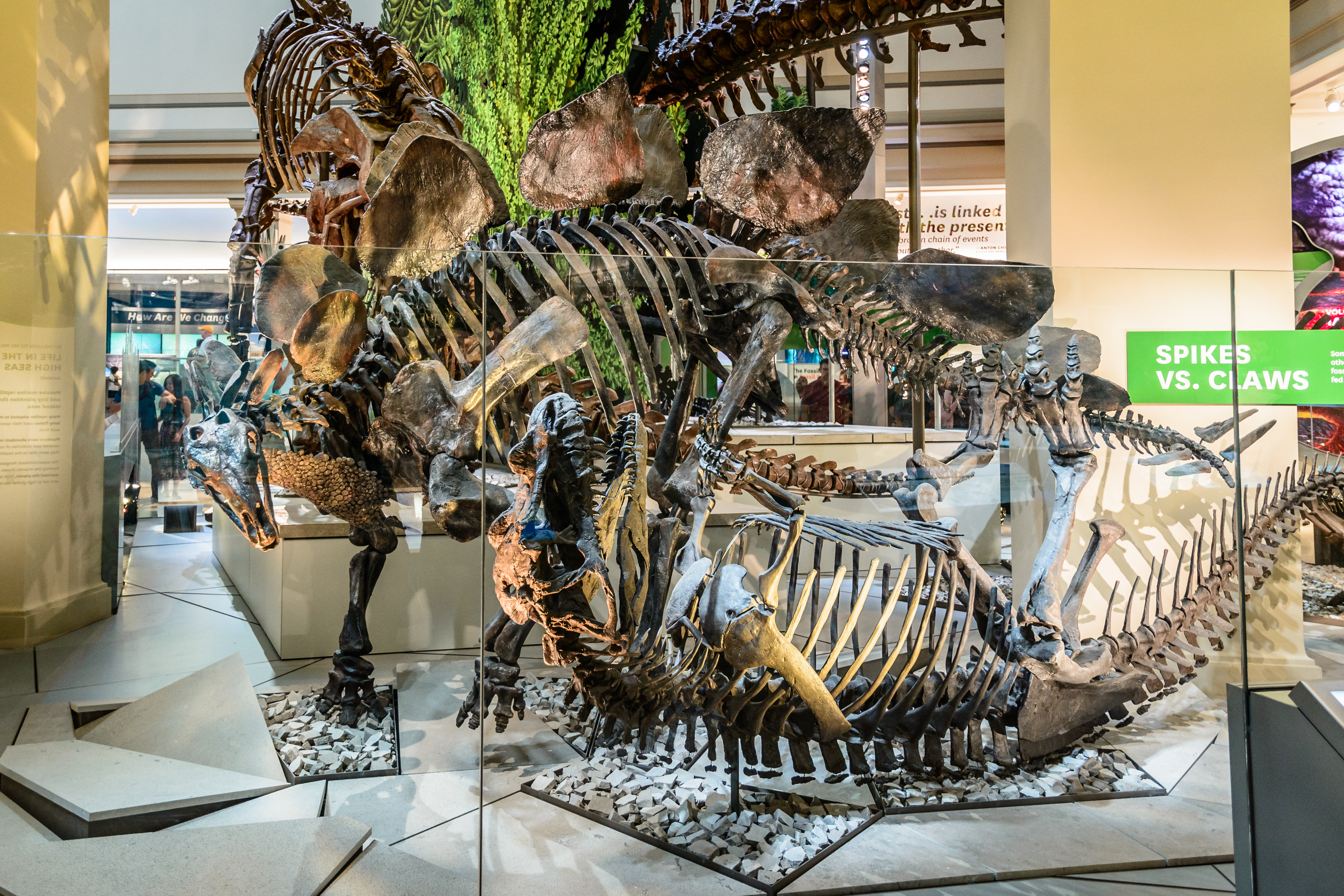
Holotype cast as currently mounted as if fighting with Stegosaurus at the Smithsonian National Museum of Natural History

After the discovery of the holotype of C. nasicornis, a significant Ceratosaurus find was not made until the early 1960s, when paleontologist James Madsen and his team unearthed a fragmentary, disarticulated skeleton including the skull (UMNH VP 5278) in the Cleveland-Lloyd Dinosaur Quarry in Utah. This find represents one of the largest-known Ceratosaurus specimens. A second, articulated specimen including the skull (MWC 1) was discovered in 1976 by Thor Erikson, the son of paleontologist Lance Erikson, near Fruita, Colorado. A fairly complete specimen, it lacks lower jaws, forearms, and gastralia. The skull, although reasonably complete, was found disarticulated and is strongly flattened sideways. Although it was a large individual, it had not yet reached adult size, as indicated by unfused sutures between the skull bones. Scientifically accurate three-dimensional reconstructions of the skull for use in museum exhibits were produced using a complicated process including molding and casting of the individual original bones, correction of deformities, reconstruction of missing parts, assembly of the bone casts into their proper position, and painting to match the original color of the bones.

Both the Fruita and Cleveland-Lloyd specimens were described by Madsen and Samuel Paul Welles in a 2000 monograph, with the Utah specimen being assigned to the new species C. dentisulcatus and the Colorado specimen being assigned to the new species C. magnicornis. The name dentisulcatus refers to the parallel grooves present on the inner sides of the premaxillary teeth and the first three teeth of the lower jaw in that specimen. Magnicornis points to the larger nasal horn. As of 2025, both species are generally considered as synonyms of C. nasicornis. Brooks Britt and colleagues, in 2000, claimed that the C. nasicornis holotype was in fact a juvenile individual, with the two larger species representing the adult state of a single species. Oliver Rauhut, in 2003, and Matthew Carrano and Scott Sampson, in 2008, considered the anatomical differences between these species to represent ontogenetic (age-related) or individual variation.

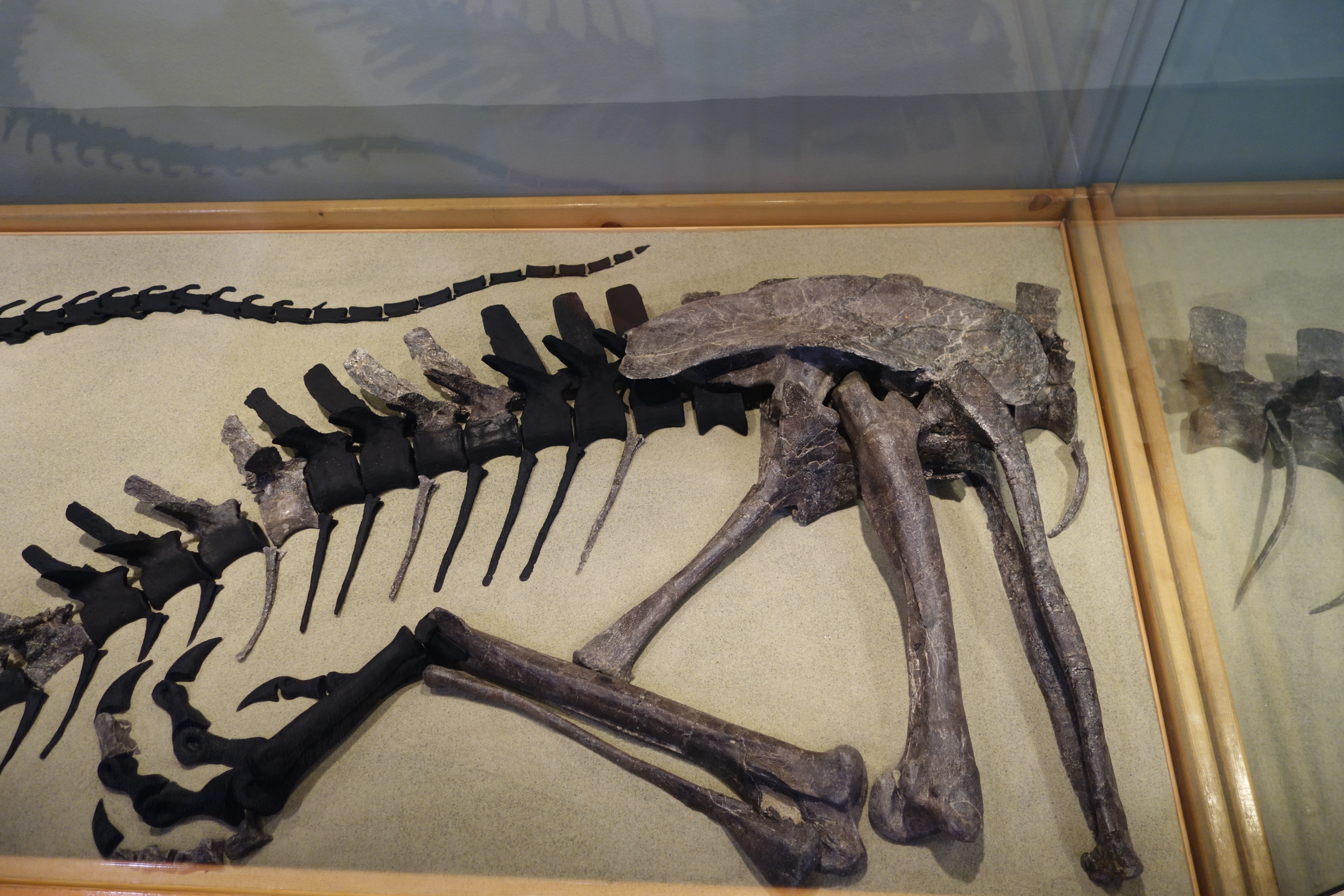
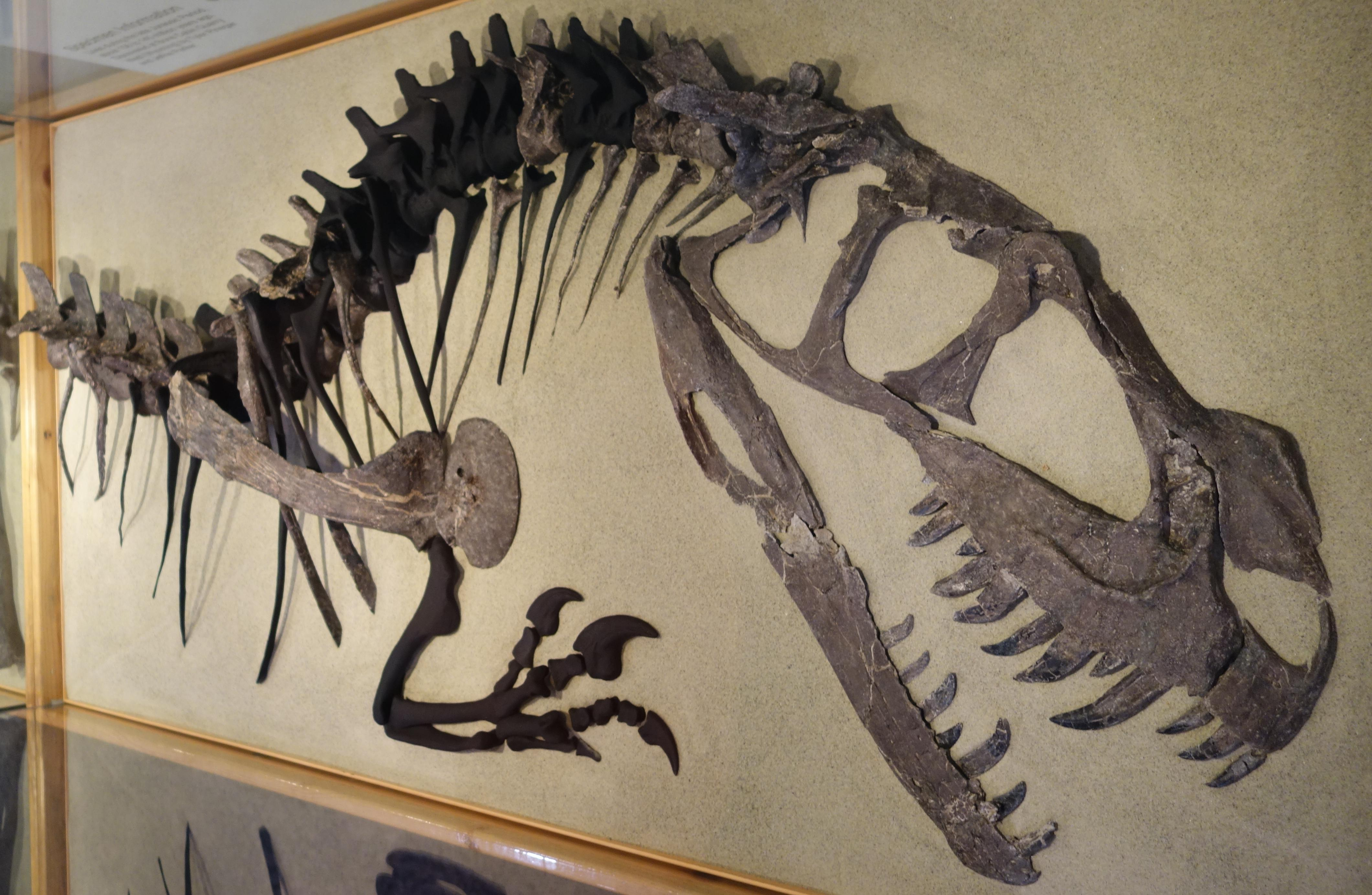
Partial juvenile specimen (hind and front parts), North American Museum of Ancient Life

A further specimen (BYU 881-12893) was discovered in 1992 in the Agate Basin Quarry southeast of Moore, Utah. The specimen includes the front half of a skull, seven fragmentary pelvic dorsal vertebrae, and an articulated pelvis and sacrum. In 1996, a Ceratosaurus skeleton belonging to a juvenile individual was discovered near Bone Cabin Quarry in Wyoming. This specimen is 34% smaller than the C. nasicornis holotype and consists of a complete skull as well as 30% of the remainder of the skeleton including a complete pelvis. The specimen was bought by the North American Museum of Ancient Life, but because this museum is private rather than a public repository, the specimen has not been scientifically described. The museum sold the specimen to a private owner in 2024. During an auction at Sotheby's on July 16, 2025, the specimen was resold at a price of $30,510,000.

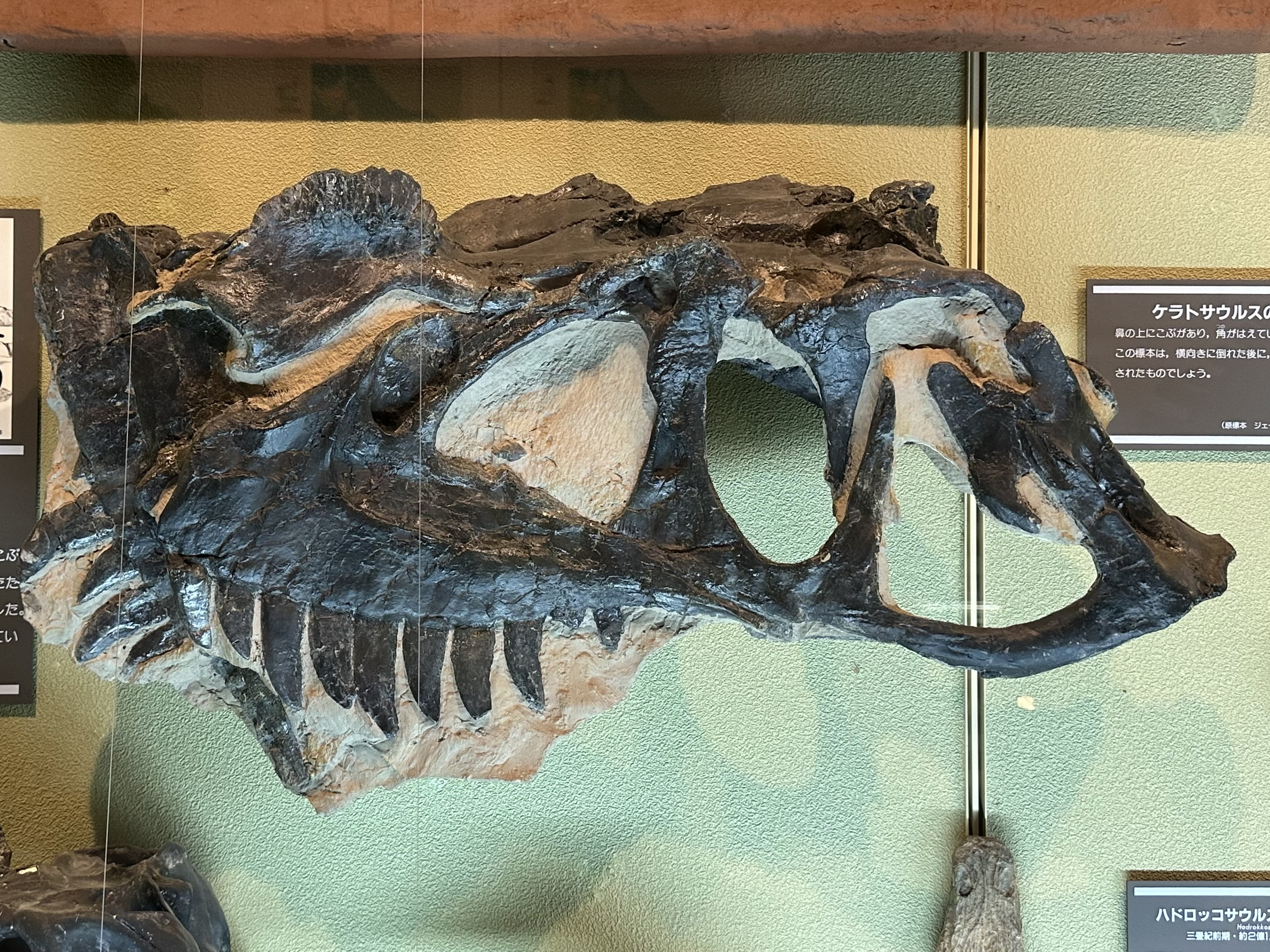
Skull displayed in Japan

Besides these five skeletal finds, fragmentary Ceratosaurus remains have been reported from various localities from stratigraphic zones 2 and 4-6 of the Morrison Formation, including some of the major fossil sites of the formation. Dinosaur National Monument, Utah, yielded an isolated right premaxilla (DNM 972). A large shoulder blade (scapulocoracoid) was reported from Como Bluff in Wyoming. Another specimen stems from the Dry Mesa Quarry of Colorado and includes a left scapulocoracoid, as well as fragments of vertebrae and limb bones. In Mygatt Moore Quarry, Colorado, the genus is known from teeth.

In 1896, Marsh used the name Labrosaurus sulcatus in a caption for a figure depicting a single tooth (YPM 1936). Because Marsh did not provide any description, the name might be a nomen nudum. Later authors noted that the tooth came from Quarry 9 in Como Bluff, and that its assignment to Labrosaurus was baseless as it did not resemble other Labrosaurus teeth recognized at that time. The tooth has characteristic longitudinal grooves, which resulted in the assignment of several other, similar teeth from Tanzania and Switzerland to Labrosaurus. Subsequent studies identified the tooth as belonging to Ceratosaurus, either from the front portion of the lower jaw or the premaxilla of the upper jaw.

=== Finds outside North America ===
From 1909 to 1913, German expeditions of the Berlin Museum für Naturkunde uncovered a diverse dinosaur fauna from the Tendaguru Formation in German East Africa, in what is now Tanzania. Although commonly considered the most important African dinosaur locality, large theropod dinosaurs are only known through few and very fragmentary remains. In 1920, German paleontologist Werner Janensch assigned three dorsal vertebrae of a juvenile individual from the quarry "TL" to Ceratosaurus, as Ceratosaurus sp. (of uncertain species). In 1925, Janensch named a new species of Ceratosaurus, C. roechlingi, based on fragmentary remains from the quarry "Mw" encompassing a quadrate bone, a fibula, fragmentary caudal vertebrae, and other fragments. This specimen stems from an individual substantially larger than the C. nasicornis holotype.

In their 2000 monograph, Madsen and Welles confirmed the assignment of these finds to Ceratosaurus. In addition, they ascribed several teeth to the genus, which had originally been described by Janensch as a possible species of Labrosaurus, Labrosaurus (?) stechowi. Other authors questioned the assignment of any of the Tendaguru finds to Ceratosaurus, noting that none of these specimens displays features diagnostic for that genus. In 2011, Rauhut found both C. roechlingi and Labrosaurus (?) stechowi to be possible ceratosaurids, but found them to be undiagnostic at genus level and designated them as nomina dubia (doubtful names). In 1990, Timothy Rowe and Jacques Gauthier mentioned yet another Ceratosaurus species from Tendaguru, Ceratosaurus ingens, which purportedly was erected by Janensch in 1920 and was based on 25 isolated, very large teeth up to 15 cm (5.9 in) in length. However, Janensch assigned this species to Megalosaurus, not to Ceratosaurus. Therefore, this name might be a simple copying error. Rauhut, in 2011, showed that Megalosaurus ingens was not closely related to either Megalosaurus or Ceratosaurus, but possibly represents a carcharodontosaurid instead.

In 2000 and 2006, paleontologists led by Octávio Mateus described a find from the Lourinhã Formation of central-west Portugal (ML 352) as a new specimen of Ceratosaurus, consisting of a right femur (thigh bone), a left tibia (shin bone), and several isolated teeth recovered from the cliffs of Valmitão beach, between the municipalities of Lourinhã and Torres Vedras. The bones were found embedded in yellow to brown, fine-grained sandstones, which were deposited by rivers as floodplain deposits and belong to the lower levels of the Porto Novo Member, which is thought to be late Kimmeridgian in age. Additional bones of this individual (SHN (JJS)-65), including a left femur, a right tibia, and a partial left fibula (calf bone), were since exposed due to progressing cliff erosion. Although initially part of a private collection, these additional elements became officially curated after the private collection was donated to the Sociedade de História Natural in Torres Vedras and were described in detail in 2015. The specimen was ascribed to the species Ceratosaurus dentisulcatus by Mateus and colleagues in 2006. A 2008 review by Carrano and Sampson confirmed the assignment to Ceratosaurus, but concluded that the assignment to any specific species is not possible at present. In 2015, Elisabete Malafaia and colleagues, who questioned the validity of C. dentisulcatus, assigned the specimen to Ceratosaurus aff. Ceratosaurus nasicornis.

Other reports include a single tooth found in Moutier, Switzerland. The tooth was originally included in Megalosaurus meriani by Jean-Baptiste Greppin in 1870, but transferred to the genus Labrosaurus, as Labrosaurus (?) stechowi, by Janensch in 1920. (Note: The original Megalosaurus meriani material included not only the tooth but multiple bones, which were later found to belong to a crocodylomorph and a sauropod; the latter is now known under the name Amanzia.) The tooth was assigned to Ceratosaurus sp. (of unknown species) by Madsen and Welles in their 2000 study, and to an indeterminate member of Ceratosauria by Carrano and colleagues in 2012. In 2008, Matías Soto and Daniel Perea described teeth from the Tacuarembó Formation in Uruguay, including a presumed premaxillary tooth crown. This shows vertical striations on its inner side and lacks denticles on its front edge. These features are, in this combination, only known from Ceratosaurus. The authors, however, stressed that an assignment to Ceratosaurus is infeasible because the remains are scant and note that the assignment of the European and African material to Ceratosaurus has to be viewed with caution. In 2020, Soto and colleagues described additional Ceratosaurus teeth from the same formation that further support their earlier interpretation.

== Description ==
Size of two specimens compared to a human, with the holotype of C. nasicornis (USNM 4735) in orange and a larger specimen (UMNH VP 5278) in blue

Ceratosaurus followed the body plan typical for large theropod dinosaurs. As a biped, it moved on powerful legs, while its arms were reduced in size. Specimen USNM 4735, the first discovered skeleton and holotype of Ceratosaurus nasicornis, was an individual 5.3 m (17 ft) or 5.69 m (18.7 ft) long according to separate sources. Whether this animal was fully grown is unclear. Othniel Charles Marsh, in 1884, suggested that this specimen weighed about half as much as the contemporary Allosaurus. In more recent accounts, this was revised to 418 kilograms (922 lb), 524 kg (1,155 lb), or 670 kg (1,480 lb). Three additional skeletons discovered in the latter half of the 20th century were substantially larger. The first of these, UMNH VP 5278, was estimated by James Madsen to have been around 8.8 m (29 ft) long, but was later estimated at 7 m (23 ft) long. Its weight was calculated at 980 kg (2,160 lb), 452 kg (996 lb), 700 kg (1,540 lb), and 1,132 kg (2,500 lb) in separate works. The second skeleton, MWC 1, was estimated to be slightly larger than the holotype specimen by Foster in 2020, at 438 kg (966 lb). In 2025, Riley Sombathy and colleagues gave a much higher estimate of 1,240 kg (2,730 lb), which would make it the largest Ceratosaurus specimen. The third specimen, BYU 881-12893, was estimated at 1,120 kg (2,470 lb) by Sombathy and colleagues. Another specimen, ML 352, discovered in Portugal in 2000, was estimated at 6 m (20 ft) in length and 600 kg (1,320 lb) in weight.

=== Skull ===
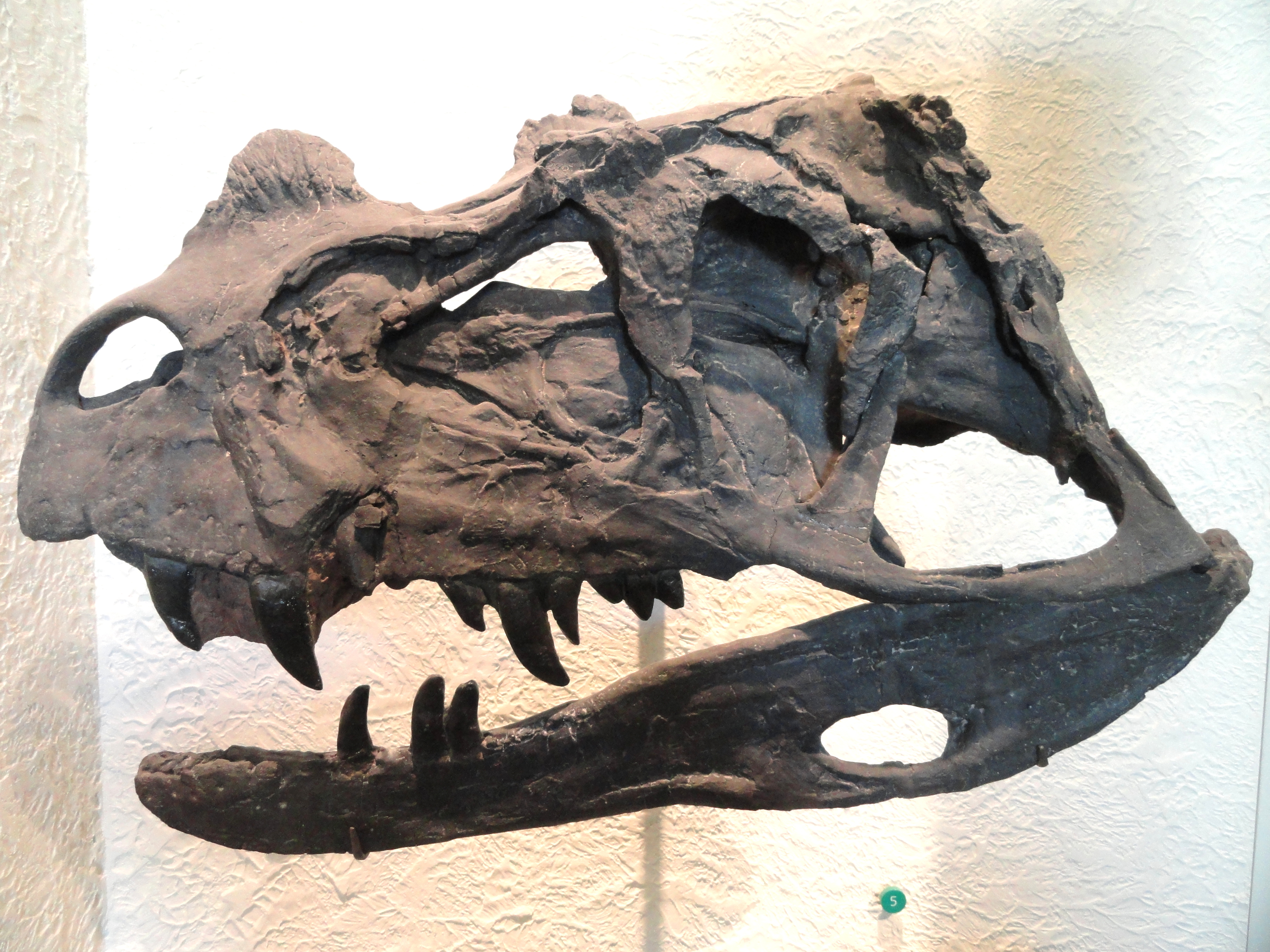
Cast of the skull of the C. nasicornis holotype, showing the large nasal horn, American Museum of Natural History

The skull was quite large in proportion to the rest of its body. It measures 55 cm (22 in) in length in the C. nasicornis holotype, measured from the tip of the snout to the occipital condyle, which connects to the first cervical vertebra. The width of this skull is difficult to reconstruct, as it is heavily distorted, and Gilmore's 1920 reconstruction was later found to be too wide. The fairly complete skull of specimen MWC 1 was estimated to have been 60 cm (24 in) long and 16 cm (6.3 in) wide. This skull was somewhat more elongated than that of the holotype. The skull length of the largest specimen is estimated at 79 centimetres (31 in) in length. The back of the skull was more lightly built than in some other larger theropods due to extensive skull openings, yet the jaws were deep to support the proportionally large teeth. The lacrimal bone formed not only the back margin of the antorbital fenestra, a large opening between eye and bony nostril, but also part of its upper margin, unlike in members of the related Abelisauridae. The quadrate bone, which was connected to the lower jaw at its bottom end to form the jaw joint, was inclined so that the jaw joint was displaced backwards in relation to the occipital condyle. This also led to a broadening of the base of the lateral temporal fenestra, a large opening behind the eyes.

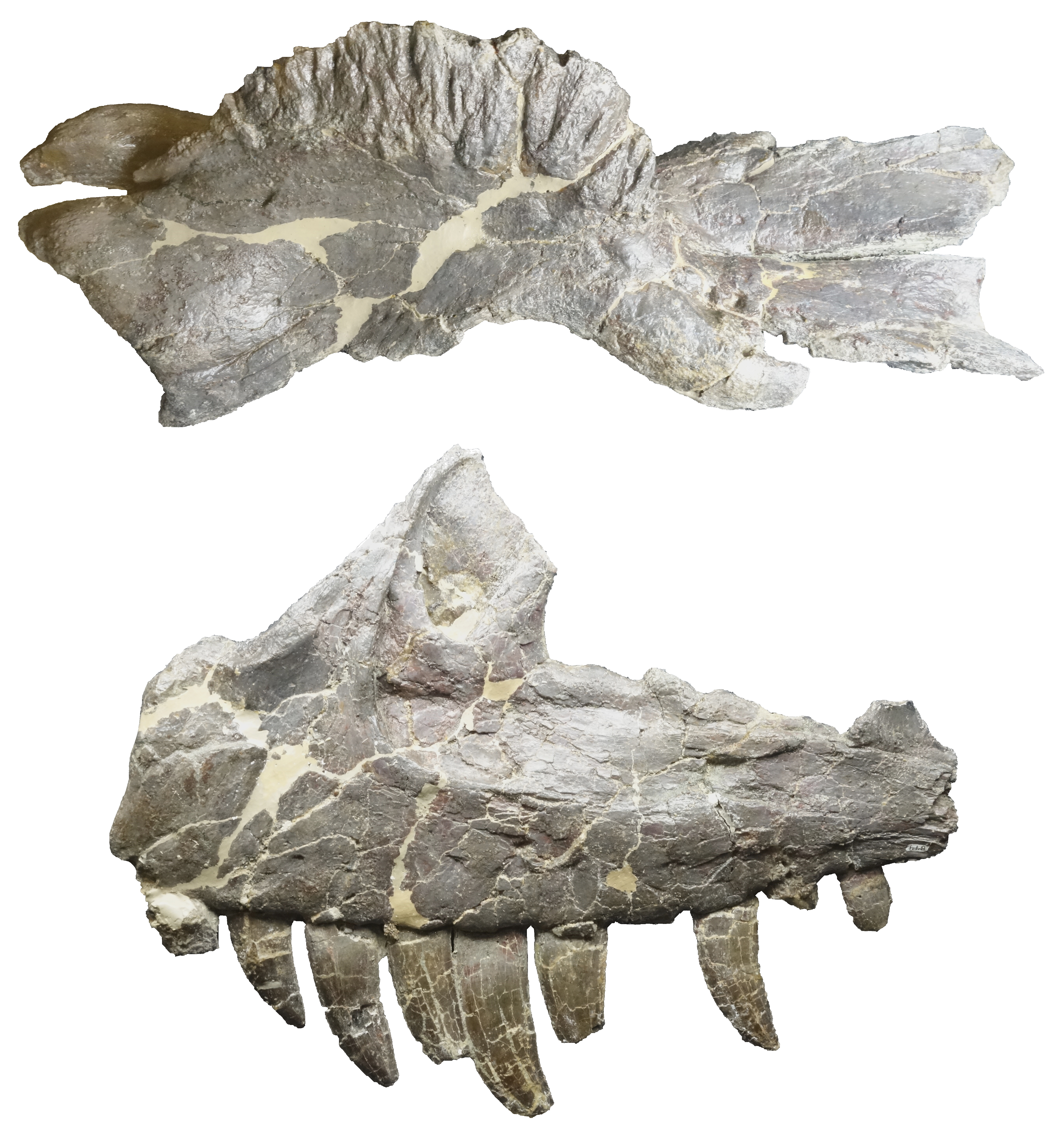
Distinguishing skull features of Ceratosaurus: The fused left and right nasal bones form a prominent nasal horn (top), and the teeth of the upper jaw are exceptionally long (bottom). These fossils are part of specimen MWC 1 from Fruita, Colorado, and are on display at the local Dinosaur Journey Museum.

The most distinctive feature was a prominent horn situated on the skull midline behind the bony nostrils, which was formed from fused protuberances of the left and right nasal bones. Only the bony horn core is known from fossils. In the living animal, this core would have supported a keratinous sheath. While the base of the horn core was smooth, its upper two-thirds were wrinkled and lined with grooves that would have contained blood vessels when alive. In the holotype, the horn core is 13 cm (5.1 in) long and 2 cm (0.79 in) wide at its base, but quickly narrows to only 1.2 cm (0.47 in) further up, and is 7 cm (2.8 in) in height. It is longer and lower in the skull of MWC 1. In the living animal, the horn would likely have been more elongated due to its keratinous sheath. Behind the nasal horn, the nasal bones formed an ovalur groove. Both this groove and the nasal horn serve as features to distinguish Ceratosaurus from related genera. In addition to the large nasal horn, Ceratosaurus possessed smaller, semicircular, bony ridges in front of each eye, similar to those of Allosaurus. These ridges were formed by the lacrimal bones. In juveniles, all three horns were smaller than in adults and the two halves of the nasal horn core were not yet fused.

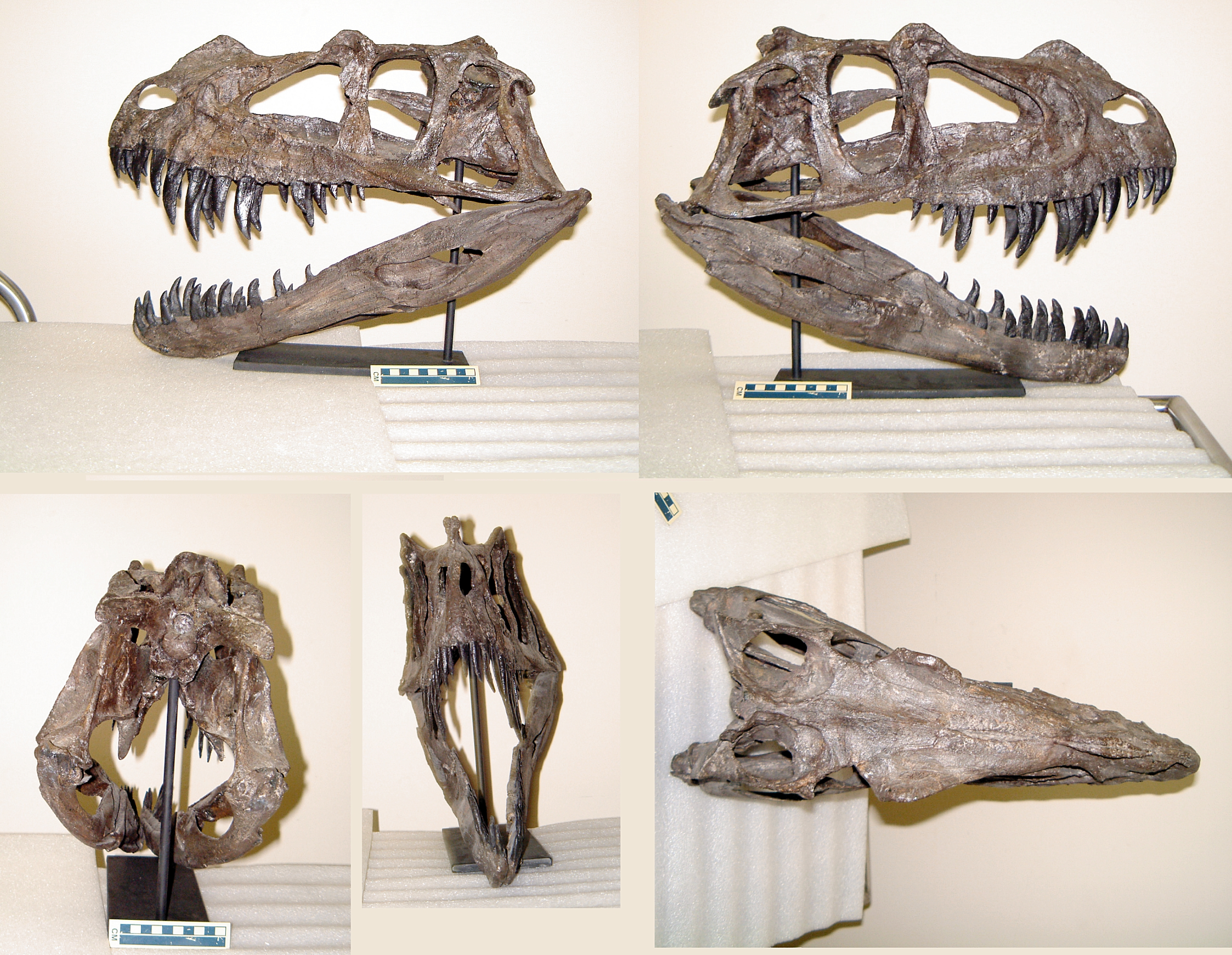
Juvenile skull cast in multiple views

The premaxillary bones, which formed the tip of the snout, contained merely three teeth on each side, less than in most other theropods. The maxillary bones of the upper jaw were lined with 15 blade-like teeth on each side in the holotype. The first eight of these teeth were very long and robust, but from the ninth tooth onward, they gradually decrease in size. As is typical for theropods, they featured finely serrated edges, which contained some 10 denticles per 5 mm (0.20 in) in the holotype. Specimen MWC 1 merely showed 11 to 12 and specimen UMNH VP 5278 showed 12 teeth in each maxilla. The teeth were more robust and more recurved in the latter specimen. In all specimens, the tooth crowns of the upper jaws were exceptionally long. In specimen UMNH VP 5278, they measured up to 9.3 cm (3.7 in) long, which is equal to the minimum height of the lower jaw. In the holotype, they are 7 cm (2.8 in) in length, which even surpasses the minimum height of the lower jaw. In other theropods, a comparable tooth length is only known from the possibly closely related Genyodectes. In contrast, several members of Abelisauridae feature very short tooth crowns. In the holotype, each half of the dentary, the tooth-bearing bone of the mandible, was equipped with 15 teeth, which are, however, poorly preserved. Both specimens MWC 1 and UMNH VP 5278 show only 11 teeth in each dentary, which were, as shown by the latter specimen, slightly straighter and less sturdy than those of the upper jaw.

=== Postcranial skeleton ===
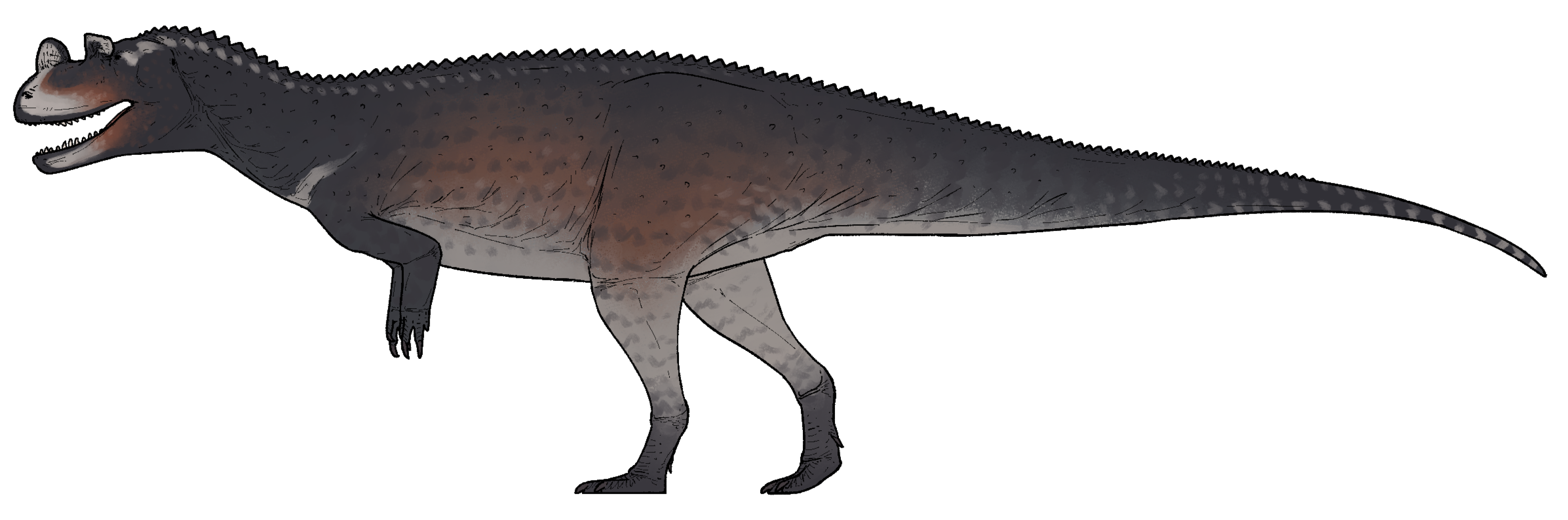
Life restoration of C. nasicornis

The exact number of vertebrae is unknown due to several gaps in the spine of the Ceratosaurus nasicornis holotype. At least 20 vertebrae formed the neck and back in front of the sacrum. In the middle portion of the neck, the centra (bodies) of the vertebrae were as long as they were tall, while in the front and rear portions of the neck, the centra were shorter than their height. The upwards projecting neural spines were comparatively large and, in the dorsal (back) vertebrae, were as tall as the vertebral centra were long. The sacrum, consisting of six fused sacral vertebrae, was arched upwards, with its vertebral centra strongly reduced in height in its middle portion, as is the case in some other ceratosaurians. The tail comprised around 50 caudal vertebrae and was about half of the animal's total length. In the holotype, it was estimated at 2.84 m (9.33 ft). The tail was deep from top to bottom due to its high neural spines and elongated chevrons, bones located below the vertebral centra. As in other dinosaurs, it counterbalanced the body and contained the massive caudofemoralis muscle, which was responsible for forward thrust during locomotion, pulling the thigh backwards when contracted.

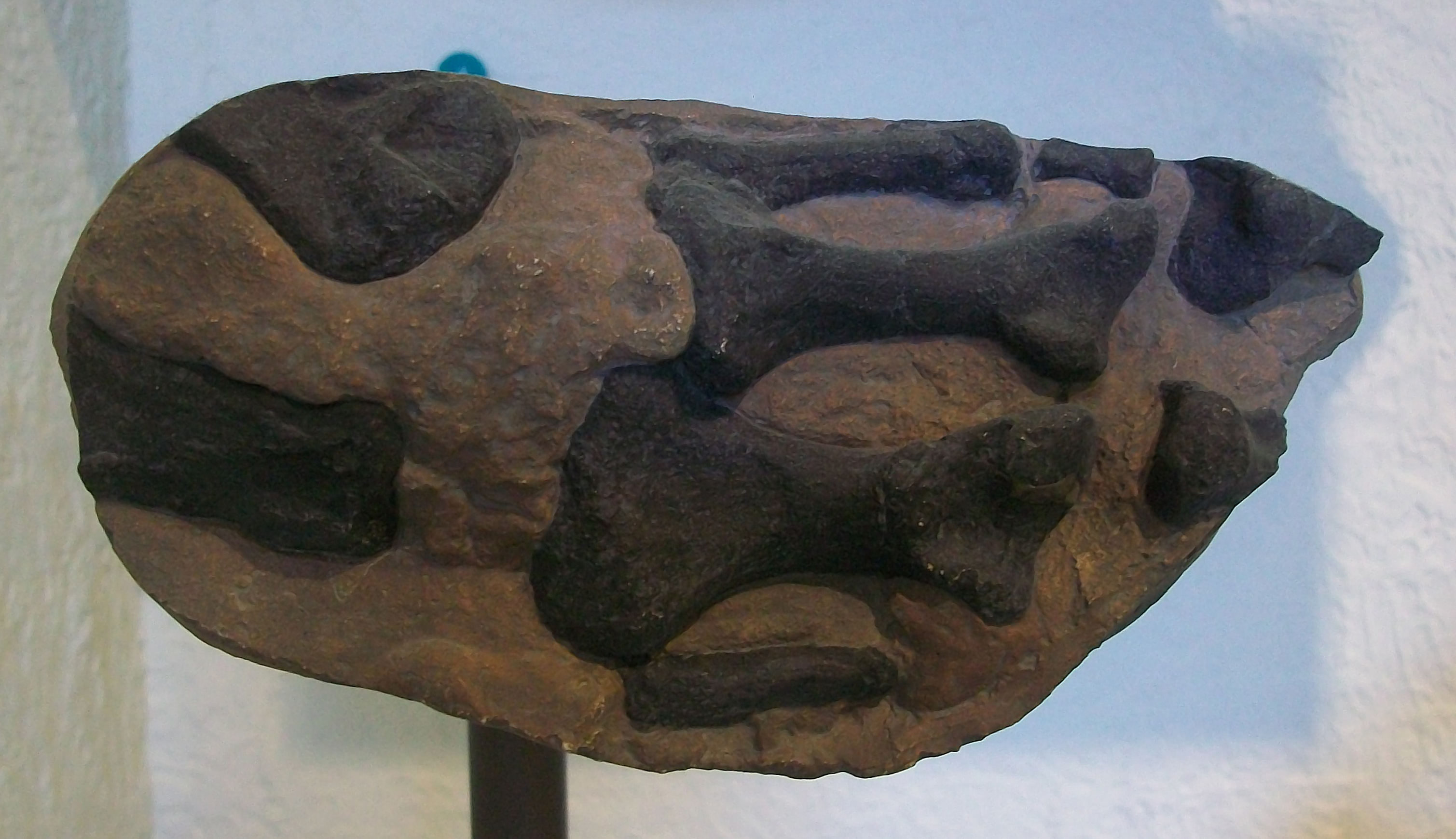
Cast of the hand of C. nasicornis (AMNH 27631): Most phalanges of the fingers are missing.

The scapula (shoulder blade) was fused with the coracoid, forming a single bone without any visible demarcation between the two original elements. The forelimbs were slenderer than those of Allosaurus, and the hands were shorter. The C. nasicornis holotype was found with an articulated left arm including an incomplete hand. Although disarticulated during preparation, a cast had been made of the fossil beforehand to document the original relative positions of the bones. Carpal bones were not known from any specimen, leading some authors to suggest that they were lost in the genus. In a 2016 paper, Matthew Carrano and Jonah Choiniere suggested that one or more cartilaginous (not bony) carpals were probably present, as indicated by a gap present between the forearm bones and the metacarpals, as well as by the surface texture within this gap seen in the cast. In contrast to most more-derived theropods, which showed only three digits on each hand (digits I–III), Ceratosaurus retained four digits, with digit IV being reduced in size. The first and fourth metacarpals were short, while the second was slightly longer than the third. The metacarpus and especially the first phalanges were proportionally very short, unlike in most other basal theropods. Only the first phalanges of digits II, III, and IV are preserved in the holotype. The total number of phalanges and unguals (claw bones) is unknown. The anatomy of metacarpal I indicates that phalanges had originally been present on this digit as well. The pes (foot) consisted of three weight-bearing digits, numbered II–IV. Digit I, which in theropods is usually reduced to a dewclaw that does not touch the ground, is not preserved in the holotype. Marsh, in his original 1884 description, assumed that this digit was lost in Ceratosaurus, but Charles Gilmore, in his 1920 monograph, noted an attachment area on the second metatarsal demonstrating the presence of this digit.

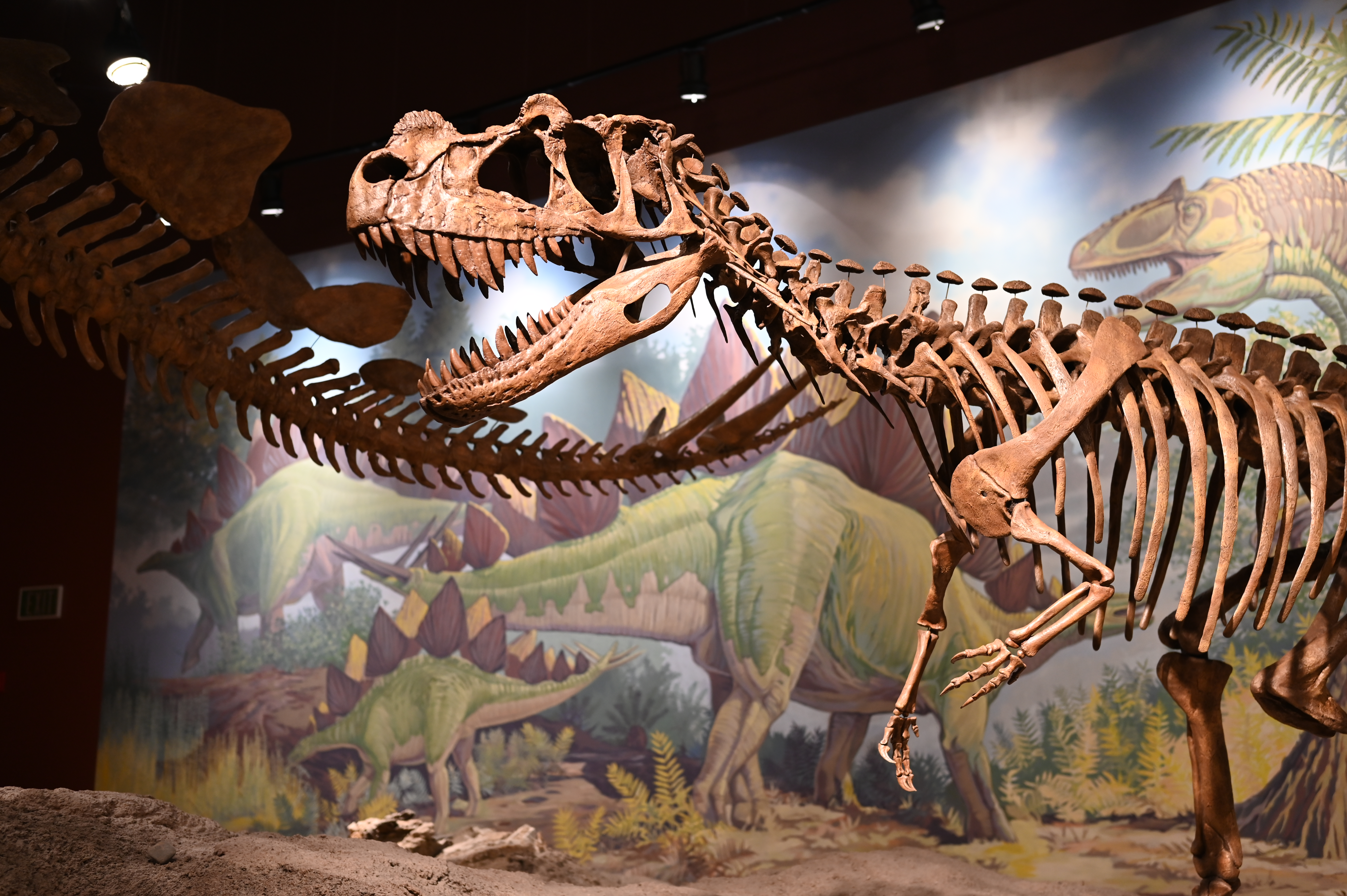
Front part of skeleton, Utah Field House of Natural History; note row of osteoderms along the back

Uniquely among theropods, Ceratosaurus possessed small, elongated, and irregularly formed osteoderms (skin bones) along the midline of its body. Such osteoderms have been found above the neural spines of cervical vertebrae 4 and 5, as well as caudal vertebrae 4 to 10, and probably formed a continuous row that might have extended from the base of the skull to most of the tail. As suggested by Gilmore in 1920, their position in the rock matrix likely reflects their exact position in the living animal. The osteoderms above the tail were found separated from the neural spines by 25 mm (0.98 in) to 38 mm (1.5 in), possibly accounting for skin and muscles present in between, while those of the neck were much closer to the neural spines. Apart from the body midline, the skin contained additional osteoderms, as indicated by a 58 mm (2.3 in) by 70 mm (2.8 in) large, roughly quadrangular plate found together with the holotype. The position of this plate on the body, however, is unknown. Specimen UMNH VP 5278 was also found with a number of osteoderms, which have been described as amorphous in shape. Although most of these ossicles were found at most 5 m apart from the skeleton, they were not directly associated with any vertebrae, unlike in the C. nasicornis holotype, so their original position on the body cannot be inferred from this specimen.

== Classification ==
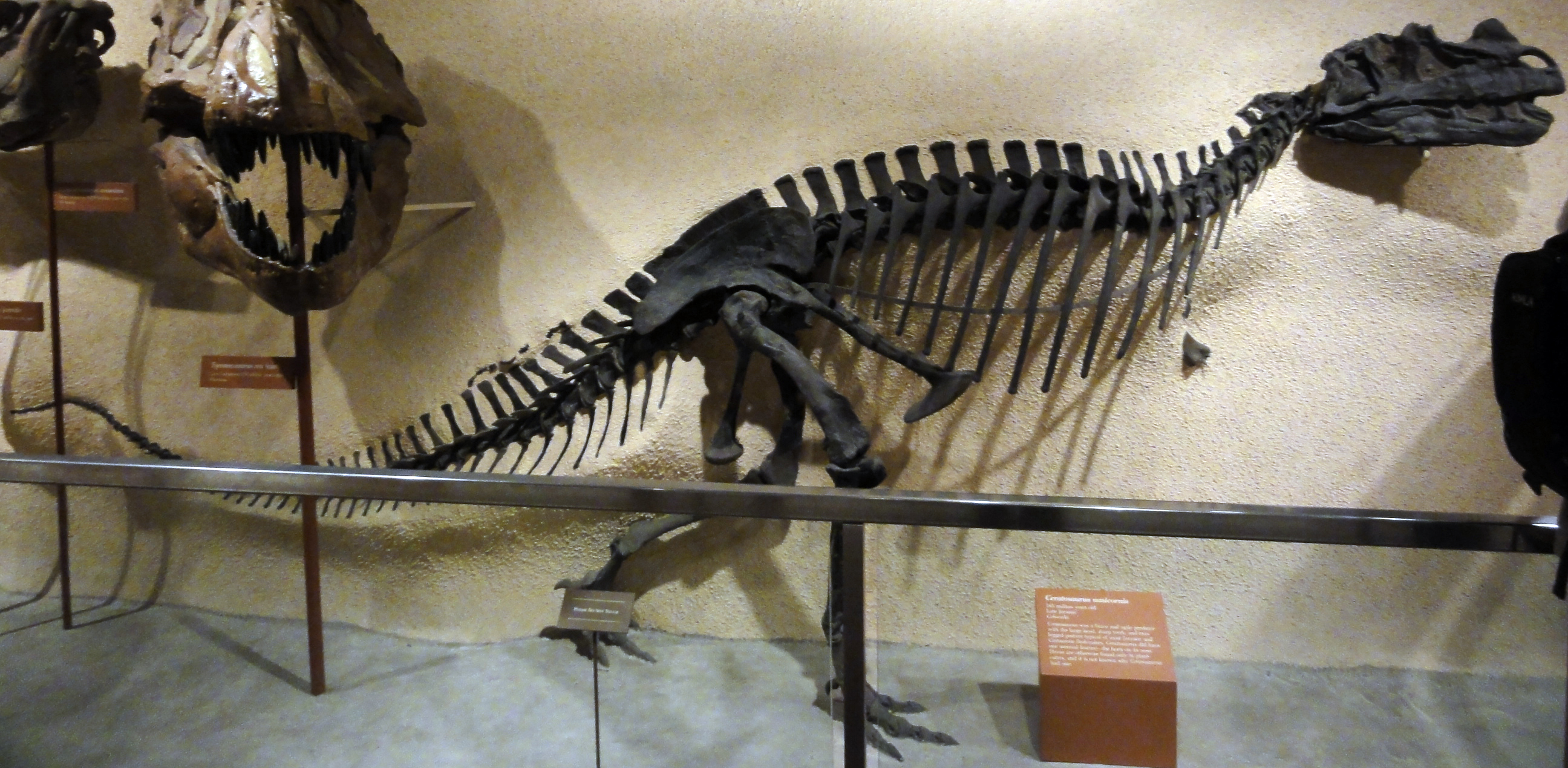
C. nasicornis holotype, as mounted by Charles Gilmore in 1910 and 1911, National Museum of Natural History

In his original description of the Ceratosaurus nasicornis holotype and subsequent publications, Marsh noted a number of characteristics that were unknown in all other theropods known at the time. Two of these features, the fused pelvis and fused metatarsus, were known from modern-day birds and, according to Marsh, clearly demonstrate the close relationship between the latter and dinosaurs. To set the genus apart from Allosaurus, Megalosaurus, and coelurosaurs, Marsh made Ceratosaurus the only member of both a new family, Ceratosauridae, and a new infraorder, Ceratosauria. This was questioned in 1892 by Edward Drinker Cope, Marsh's archrival in the Bone Wars, who argued that distinctive features such as the nasal horn merely showed that C. nasicornis was a distinct species, but were insufficient to justify a distinct genus. Consequently, he assigned C. nasicornis to the genus Megalosaurus, creating the new combination Megalosaurus nasicornis.

Although Ceratosaurus was retained as a distinct genus in all subsequent analyses, its relationships remained controversial during the following century. Both Ceratosauridae and Ceratosauria were not widely accepted, with only few and poorly known additional members identified. Over the years, separate authors classified Ceratosaurus within Deinodontidae, Megalosauridae, Coelurosauria, Carnosauria, and Deinodontoidea. In his 1920 revision, Gilmore argued that the genus was the most basal theropod known from after the Triassic, being not that closely related to any other contemporary theropod known at that time. It thus warrants its own family: Ceratosauridae. It was not until the establishment of cladistic analysis in the 1980s, however, that Marsh's original claim of Ceratosauria as a distinct group gained ground. In 1985, the newly discovered South American genera Abelisaurus and Carnotaurus were found to be closely related to Ceratosaurus. Gauthier, in 1986, recognized Coelophysoidea to be closely related to Ceratosaurus, although this clade falls outside of Ceratosauria in most recent analyses. Many additional members of Ceratosauria have been recognized since then.

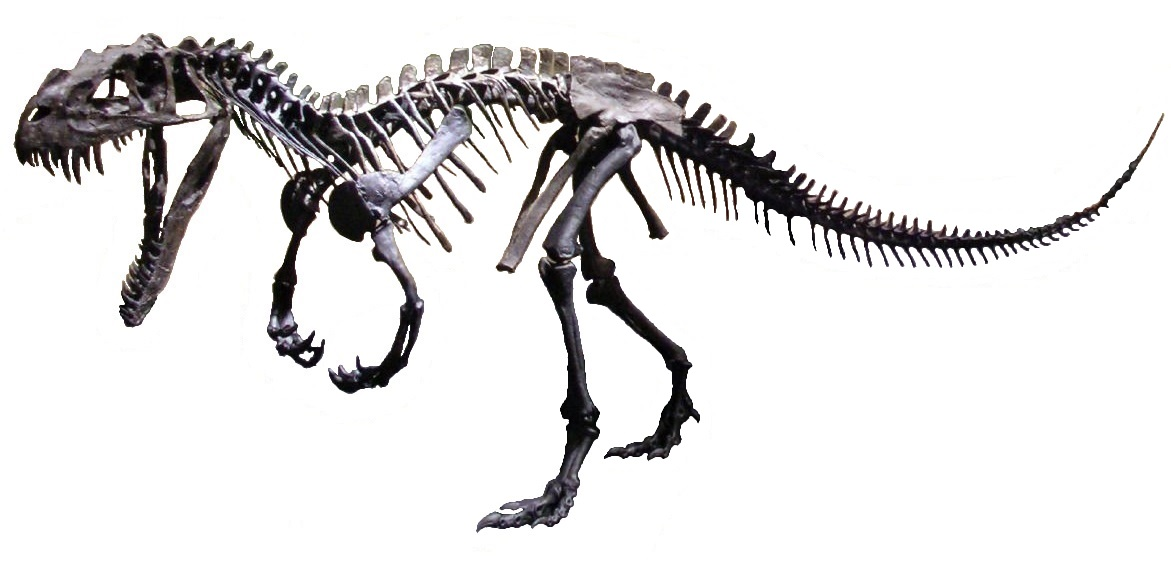
Mounted cast of a juvenile skeleton, Dinosaur Discovery Museum

Ceratosauria split off early from the evolutionary line leading to modern birds and is considered basal within theropods. Ceratosauria itself contains a group of derived (nonbasal) members of the families Noasauridae and Abelisauridae, which are bracketed within the clade Abelisauroidea, as well as a number of basal members, such as Elaphrosaurus, Deltadromeus, and Ceratosaurus. The position of Ceratosaurus within basal ceratosaurians is under debate. Some analyses considered Ceratosaurus as the most derived of the basal members, forming the sister taxon of Abelisauroidea. Oliver Rauhut, in 2004, proposed Genyodectes as the sister taxon of Ceratosaurus, as both genera are characterized by exceptionally long teeth in the upper jaw. Rauhut grouped Ceratosaurus and Genyodectes within the family Ceratosauridae, which was followed by several later accounts.

Shuo Wang and colleagues, in 2017, concluded that Noasauridae were not nested within Abelisauroidea as was previously assumed, but instead were more basal than Ceratosaurus. Because noasaurids had been used as a fix point to define the clades Abelisauroidea and Abelisauridae, these clades would consequently include many more taxa per definition, including Ceratosaurus. In a subsequent 2018 study, Rafael Delcourt accepted these results, but pointed out that, as a consequence, Abelisauroidea would need to be replaced by the older synonym Ceratosauroidea, which was hitherto rarely used. For Abelisauridae, Delcourt proposed a new definition that excludes Ceratosaurus, allowing for using the name in its traditional sense. Wang and colleagues furthermore found that Ceratosaurus and Genyodectes form a clade with the Argentinian genus Eoabelisaurus. Delcourt used the name Ceratosauridae to refer to this same clade, and suggested to define Ceratosauridae as containing all taxa that are more closely related to Ceratosaurus than to the abelisaurid Carnotaurus.

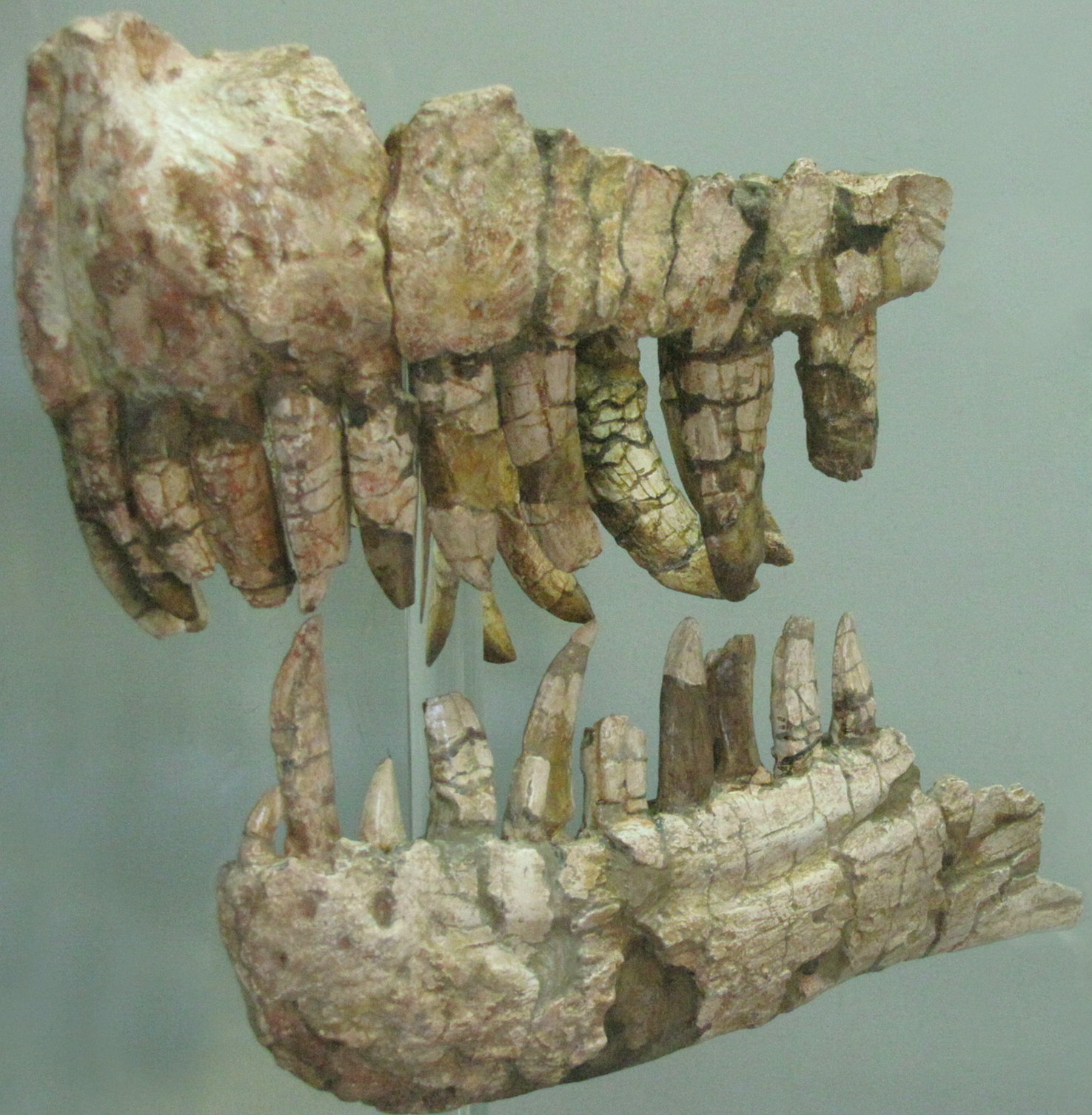
Holotype jaws of the closely related Genyodectes

The following cladogram showing the relationships of Ceratosaurus is based on the phylogenetic analysis conducted by Diego Pol and Oliver Rauhut in 2012:

- Ceratosauria
  - Berberosaurus
  - Deltadromeus
  - - - Spinostropheus
      - - Limusaurus
        - Elaphrosaurus
    - Neoceratosauria
      - Ceratosauridae
        - Ceratosaurus
        - Genyodectes
      - Abelisauroidea
        - Noasauridae
        - Abelisauridae

A skull from the Middle Jurassic of England apparently displays a nasal horn similar to that of Ceratosaurus. In 1926, Friedrich von Huene described this skull as Proceratosaurus (meaning "before Ceratosaurus"), assuming that it was an antecedent of the Late Jurassic Ceratosaurus. Today, Proceratosaurus is considered a basal member of Tyrannosauroidea, a much more derived clade of theropod dinosaurs. The nasal horn would have had evolved independently in both genera. Oliver Rauhut and colleagues, in 2010, grouped Proceratosaurus within its own family, Proceratosauridae. These authors also noted that the nasal horn is incompletely preserved, opening the possibility that it represented the foremost portion of a more extensive head crest, as seen in some other proceratosaurids such as Guanlong.

== Paleobiology ==
=== Feeding ===
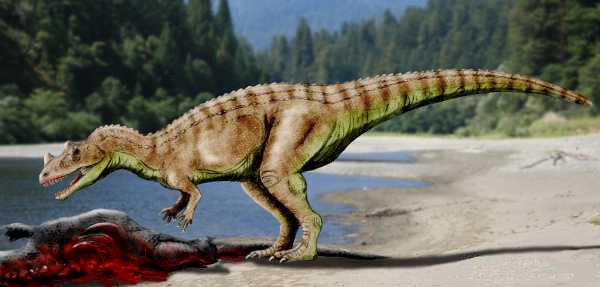
Hypothetical restoration of a feeding C. nasicornis

Ceratosaurus would have subdued prey with its jaws rather than its proportionally small hands. In 1998, Donald Henderson compared the long-snouted skull of Ceratosaurus with that of a dog: The longer teeth would have been used as fangs to deliver quick, slashing bites, with the bite force concentrated at a smaller area due to the narrow skull. In 2007, Eric Snively and Anthony Russell reconstructed the neck muscles of Ceratosaurus and suggested that upwards and sidewards movements of the head were powerful. The short moment arms of most neck muscles suggest quick movements. Consequently, these authors likewise concluded that the skull was suited for quick slashing strikes, which they compared to those of the Komodo dragon. In 2026, Taylor Oswald and Brian Curtice argued that the very long teeth of Ceratosaurus had a function similar to those of sabre-tooth cats and were used to quickly kill prey of smaller size, possibly including Nanosaurus, Dryosaurus, Camptosaurus, and juvenile sauropods.

In his 1986 popular book The Dinosaur Heresies, Bakker argued that the bones of the upper jaw were only loosely attached to the surrounding skull bones, allowing for some degree of movement within the skull, a condition termed cranial kinesis. Likewise, the bones of the lower jaw would have been able to move against each other and the quadrate bone could swing outwards, spreading the lower jaw at the jaw joint. Taken together, these features would have allowed the animal to widen its jaws in order to swallow larger food items. In a 2008 study, Casey Holliday and Lawrence Witmer re-evaluated similar claims made for other dinosaurs, concluding that the presence of muscle-powered cranial kinesis cannot be proven for any dinosaur species and was likely absent in most.

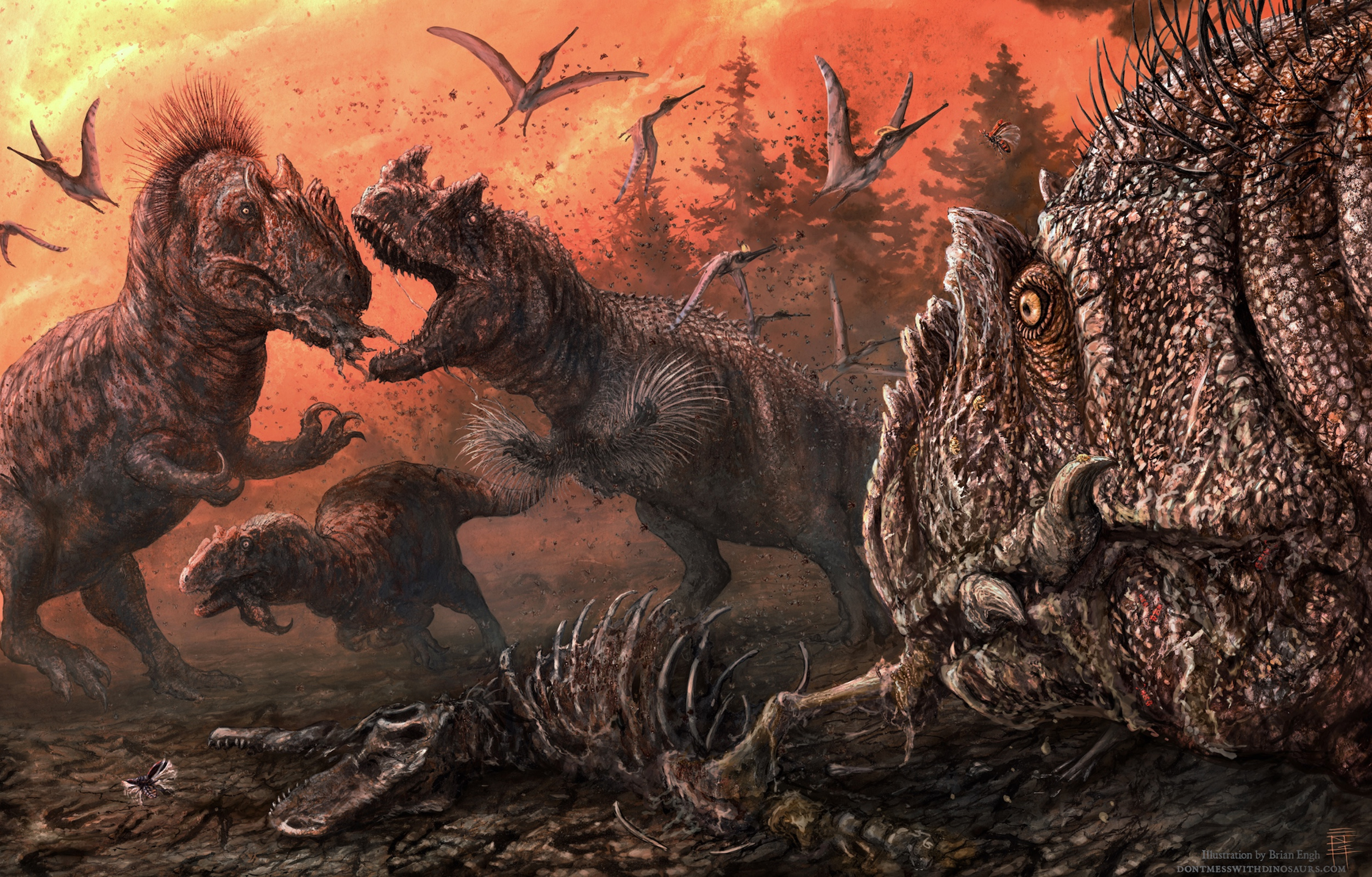
Dry season at the Mygatt-Moore Quarry showing Ceratosaurus (center) and Allosaurus fighting over the desiccated carcass of another theropod

An Allosaurus pubic foot shows marks by the teeth of another theropod, probably Ceratosaurus or Torvosaurus. The location of the bone in the body (along the bottom margin of the torso and partially shielded by the legs) and the fact that it was among the most massive in the skeleton indicates that the Allosaurus was being scavenged. A bone assemblage in the Upper Jurassic Mygatt-Moore Quarry preserves an unusually high occurrence of theropod bite marks, most of which can be attributed to Allosaurus and Ceratosaurus, while others could have been made by a large allosaurid or Torvosaurus given the size of the striations. While the position of the bite marks on the herbivorous dinosaurs is consistent with predation or early access to remains, bite marks found on Allosaurus material suggest scavenging, either from the other theropods or from another Allosaurus. The unusually high concentration of theropod bite marks compared to other assemblages could be explained either by a more complete utilization of resources during a dry season by theropods or by a collecting bias in other localities.

=== Function of the nasal horn and osteoderms ===
In 1884, Marsh considered the nasal horn of Ceratosaurus to be a "most powerful weapon" for both offensive and defensive purposes and Gilmore, in 1920, concurred with this interpretation. The use of the horn as a weapon is now generally considered unlikely. In 1985, David Norman believed that the horn was "probably not for protection against other predators," but might instead have been used for intraspecific combat among male ceratosaurs contending for breeding rights. Gregory S. Paul, in 1988, suggested a similar function and illustrated two Ceratosaurus engaged in a nonlethal butting contest. In 1990, Rowe and Gauthier went further, suggesting that the nasal horn of Ceratosaurus was "probably used for display purposes alone" and played no role in physical confrontations. If used for display, the horn likely would have been brightly colored. A display function was also proposed for the row of osteoderms running down the body midline.

=== Forelimb function ===
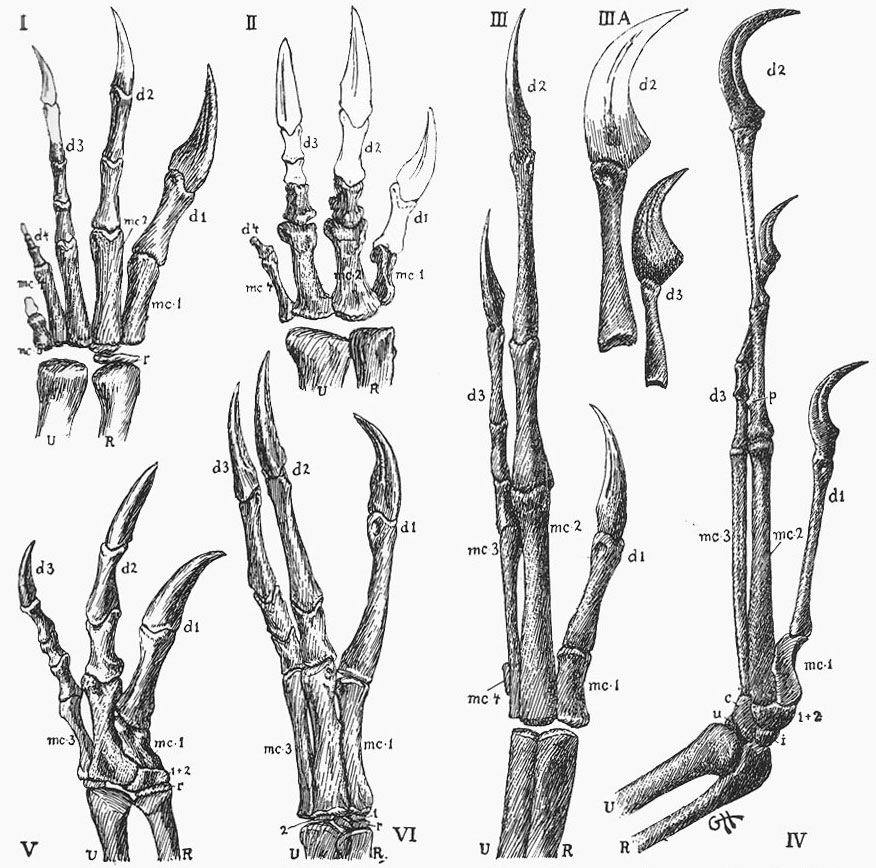
1916 comparison of dinosaur hand bones by Gerhard Heilmann; II is Ceratosaurus

The strongly shortened metacarpals and phalanges of Ceratosaurus raise the question as to whether the hand retained the grasping function assumed for other basal theropods. Within Ceratosauria, an even more extreme hand reduction can be observed in abelisaurids, where the arm lost its original function, and in Limusaurus. In a 2016 paper on the anatomy of the Ceratosaurus hand, Carrano and Jonah Choiniere stressed the great morphological similarity of the hand with those of other basal theropods, suggesting that it still fulfilled its original grasping function, despite its shortening. Although only the first phalanges are preserved, the second phalanges would have been mobile, as indicated by the well-developed articular surfaces, and the digits would likely have allowed a similar degree of motion as in other basal theropods. As in other theropods other than abelisaurids, the first digit would have been slightly turned in when flexed.

=== Brain and senses ===
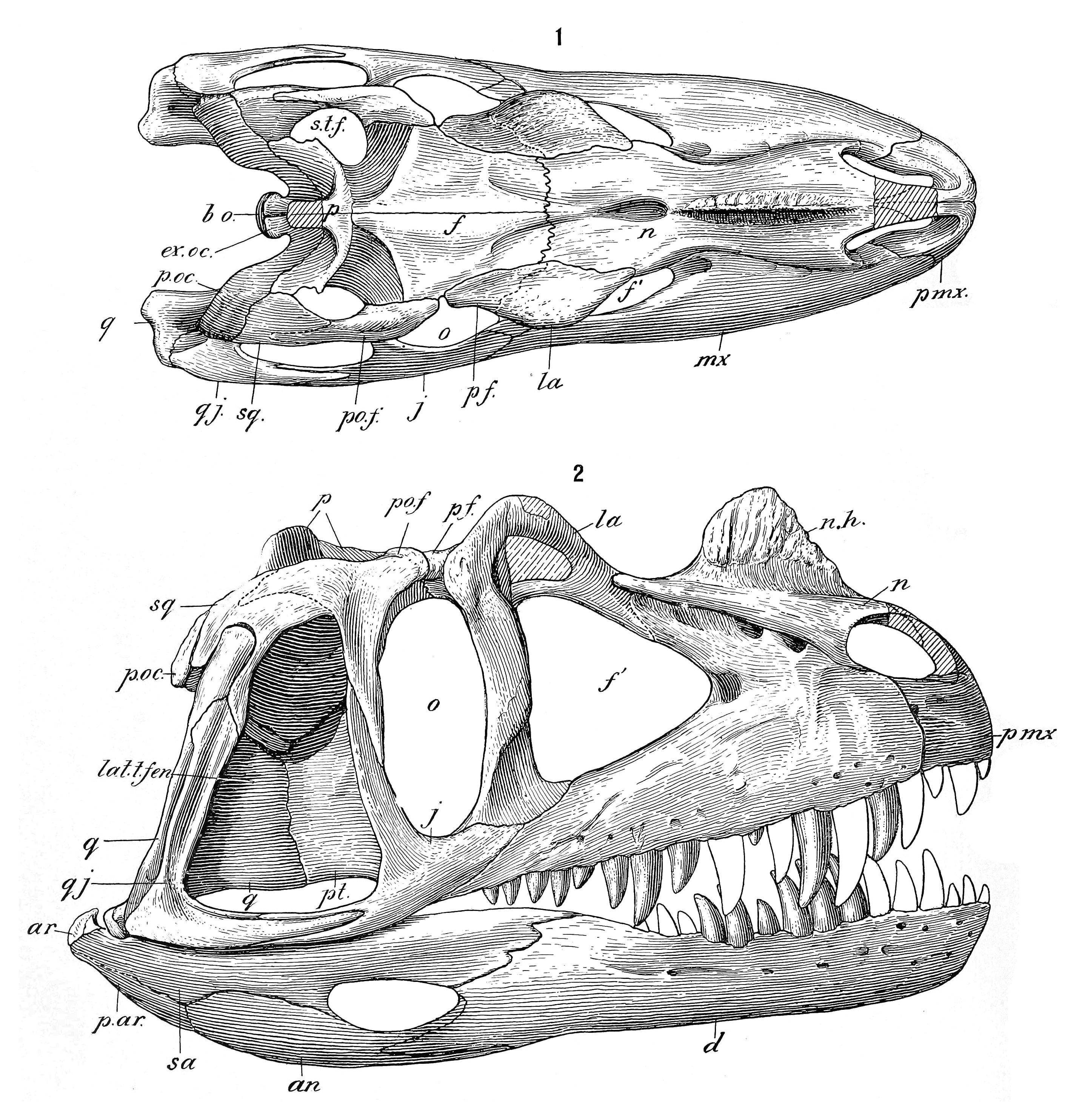
Diagram of the Ceratosaurus nasicornis holotype skull in top and side view by Charles Gilmore, 1920: This reconstruction is now thought to be too wide in top view.

A cast of the brain cavity of the holotype was made under Marsh's supervision, probably during preparation of the skull, allowing Marsh to conclude that the brain "was of medium size, but comparatively much larger than in the herbivorous dinosaurs". The skull bones, however, had been cemented together afterwards, so the accuracy of this cast could not be verified by later studies.

A second, well preserved braincase had been found with specimen MWC 1 in Fruita, Colorado, and was CT-scanned by paleontologists Kent Sanders and David Smith, allowing for reconstructions of the inner ear, gross regions of the brain, and cranial sinuses transporting blood away from the brain. In 2005, the researchers concluded that Ceratosaurus possessed a brain cavity typical for basal theropods and similar to that of Allosaurus. The impressions for the olfactory bulbs, which house the sense of smell, are well-preserved. While similar to those of Allosaurus, they were smaller than in Tyrannosaurus, which is thought to have been equipped with a very keen sense of smell. The semicircular canals, which are responsible for the sense of balance and therefore allow for inferences on habitual head orientation and locomotion, are similar to those found in other theropods. In theropods, these structures are generally conservative, suggesting that functional requirements during locomotion have been similar across species. The foremost of the semicircular canals was enlarged, a feature generally found in bipedal animals. The orientation of the lateral semicircular canal indicates that the head and neck were held horizontally in neutral position.

=== Fusion of metatarsals and paleopathology ===
The holotype of C. nasicornis was found with its left metatarsals II to IV fused together. Marsh, in 1884, dedicated a short article to this, at the time, unknown feature in dinosaurs, noting the close resemblance to the condition seen in modern birds. The presence of this feature in Ceratosaurus became controversial in 1890, when Georg Baur speculated that the fusion in the holotype was the result of a healed fracture. This claim was repeated in 1892 by Cope, while arguing that C. nasicornis should be classified as a species of Megalosaurus due to insufficient anatomical differences between these genera. However, examples of fused metatarsals in dinosaurs that are not of pathological origin have been described since, including taxa more basal than Ceratosaurus. Osborn, in 1920, explained that no abnormal bone growth is evident and that the fusion is unusual, but likely not pathological. Ronald Ratkevich, in 1976, argued that this fusion had limited the running ability of the animal, but this claim was rejected by Paul in 1988, who noted that the same feature occurs in many fast-moving animals of today, including ground birds and ungulates. A 1999 analysis by Darren Tanke and Bruce Rothschild suggested that the fusion was indeed pathological, confirming the earlier claim of Baur. Other reports of pathologies include a stress fracture in a foot bone assigned to the genus, as well as a broken tooth of an unidentified species of Ceratosaurus that shows signs of further wear received after the break.

=== Growth ===
In 2025, Sombathy and colleagues obtained thin sections of bones of multiple Ceratosaurus specimens to study growth. Thin sections may reveal growth rings called lines of arrested growth (LAGs), which may form as growth slowed down seasonally. No LAGs were found in specimens between 180 and 600 kg (400 and 1,320 lb) in body mass, suggesting that individuals grew rapidly during this phase. During this rapid growth phase, Ceratosaurus could gain about 45% of the adult body mass in one year. In contrast, later and smaller ceratosaurians such as Masiakasaurus and Majungasaurus grew considerably slower.

=== Supposed semiaquatic lifestyle ===
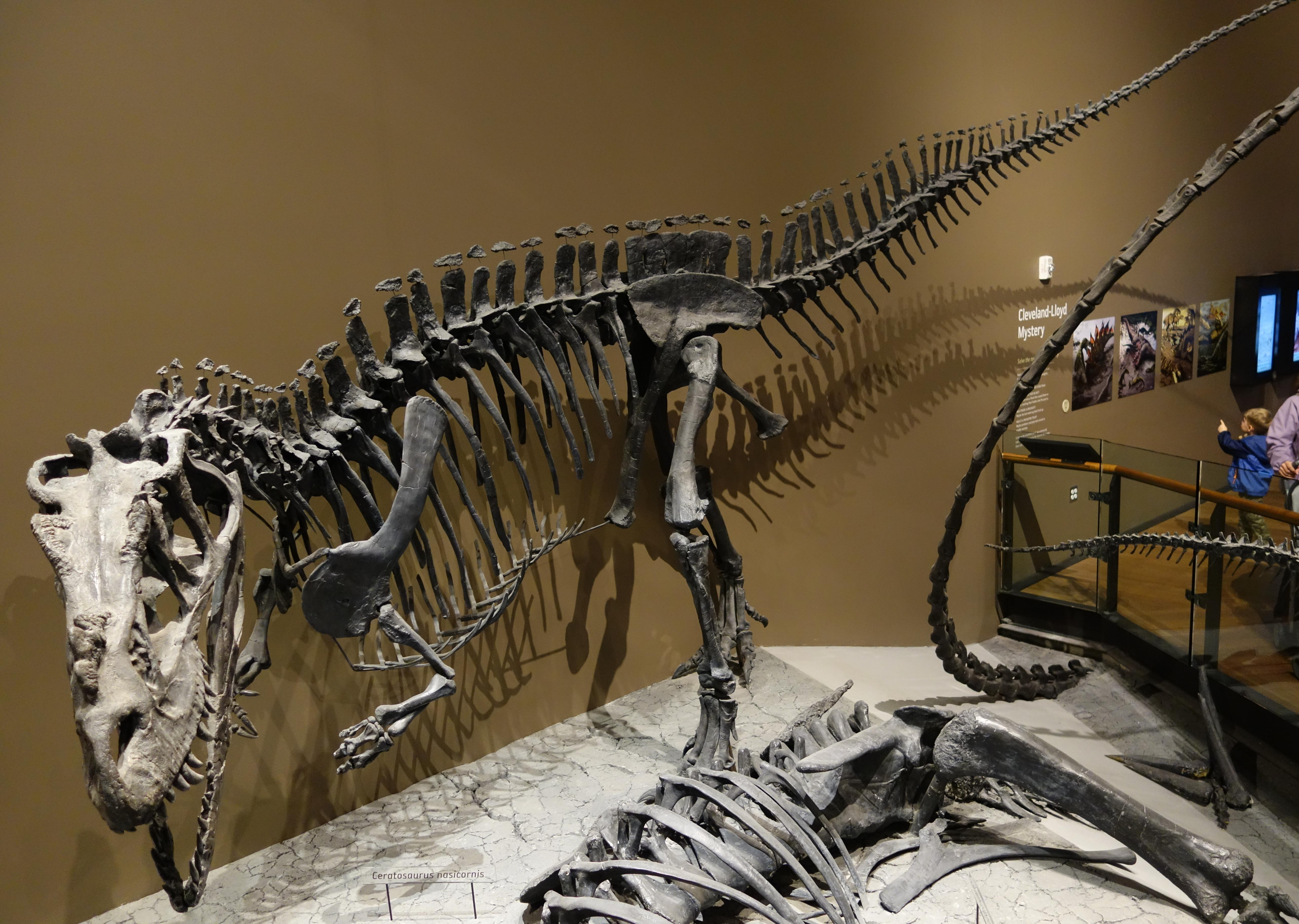
The deep tail was formerly used as argument for a semiaquatic lifestyle

In a 2004 study, Robert Bakker and Gary Bir performed statistical analyses of shed teeth from 50 separate localities in and around Como Bluff. The results showed that teeth of Ceratosaurus and megalosaurids were most common in habitats in and around water sources such as wet floodplains, lake margins, and swamps. Bakker and Bir suggested that these dinosaurs predominantly hunted near and within water bodies, and that Ceratosaurus was primarily specialized in aquatic prey such as lungfish, crocodiles, and turtles. Ceratosaurus also occasionally occurred in terrestrial localities, suggesting that Ceratosaurus sometimes fed on carcasses of larger dinosaurs. Bakker and Bir furthermore noted the long, low, and flexible body of Ceratosaurus and megalosaurids. Compared to other Morrison theropods, Ceratosaurus showed taller neural spines on the foremost tail vertebrae, which were vertical rather than inclined towards the back. Together with the deep chevron bones on the underside of the tail, they indicate a deep, "crocodile-like" tail possibly adapted for swimming. Allosaurids instead feature a shorter, taller, and stiffer body with longer legs, and would therefore have been adapted for rapid running in open terrain and primarily preyed upon large herbivorous dinosaurs.

The idea of a semiaquatic lifestyle was refuted by subsequent studies. In 2019, Changyu Yun noted that the supposed semiaquatic features occur in many other terrestrial theropods. For example, tall neural spines occur in other theropods such as Majungasaurus and Acrocanthosaurus, and modern semi-aquatic crocodilians have tall spines not only in the frontmost portion of the tail but also in the middle and rear portion. However, Yun observed that the frontmost teeth are conical and the nasal bones are fused together, possibly indicating that Ceratosaurus relied more on fish than other theropods. In their 2026 study, Oswald and Curtice noted marked differences between the teeth of Ceratosaurus and those of spinosaurids, a group that is thought to have been semiaquatic and piscivorous (preying on fish), and concluded that Ceratosaurus was not semiaquatic and fed on terrestrial prey.

== Paleoecology ==
=== Distribution and paleoenvironment ===
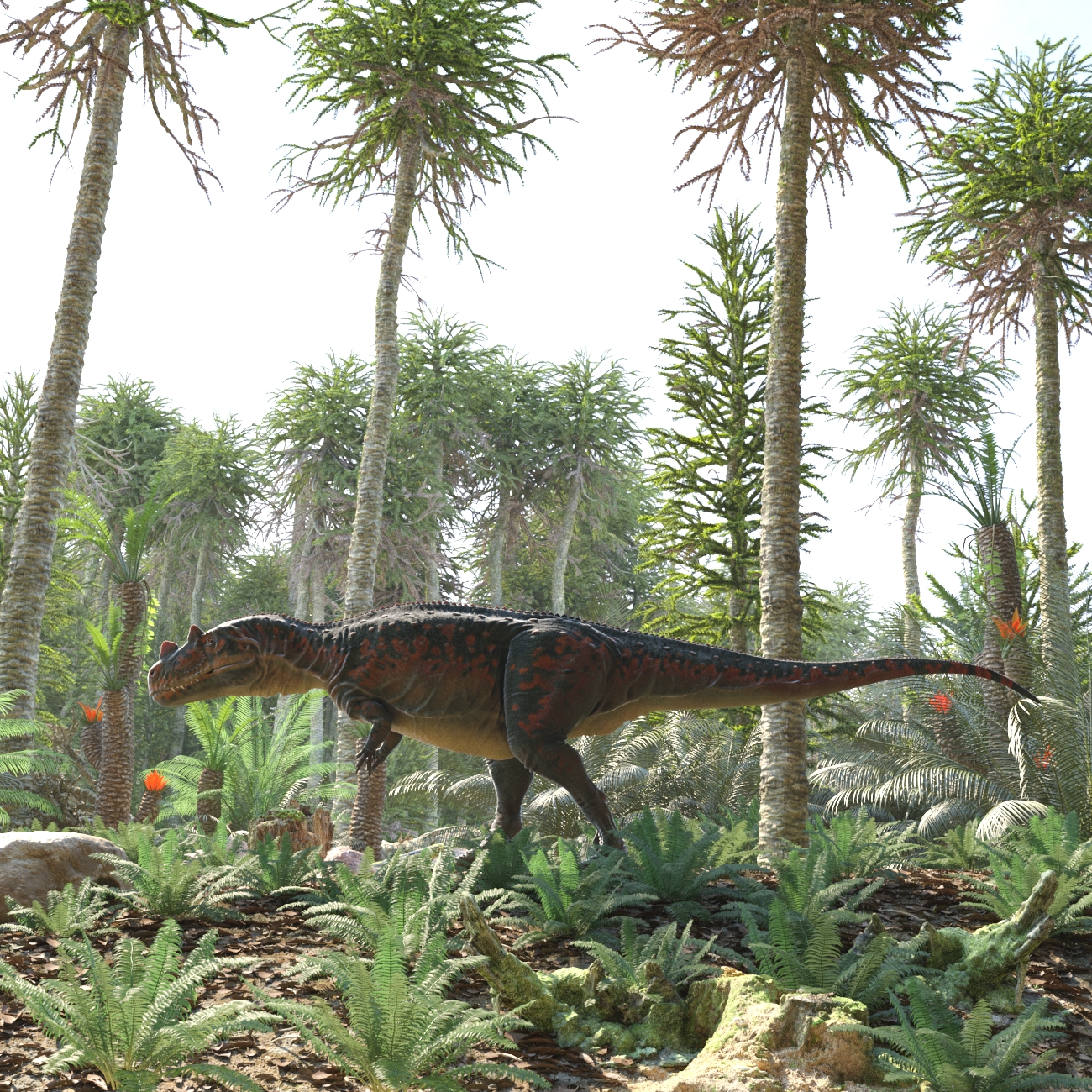
Hypothetical restoration of Ceratosaurus in Morrison Formation environment

All North American Ceratosaurus finds come from the Morrison Formation, a sequence of shallow marine and (predominantly) alluvial sedimentary rocks in the western United States and the most fertile source for dinosaur bones of the continent. According to radiometric dating, the age of the formation ranges between 156.3 million years old at its base and 146.8 million years old at the top, which places it in the late Oxfordian, Kimmeridgian, and early Tithonian stages of the Late Jurassic. Ceratosaurus is known from Kimmeridgian and Tithonian strata of the formation. The Morrison Formation is interpreted as a semiarid environment with distinct wet and dry seasons. The Morrison Basin stretched from New Mexico to Alberta and Saskatchewan, being formed when the precursors to the Front Range of the Rocky Mountains started pushing up to the west. The deposits from their east-facing drainage basins were carried by streams and rivers and deposited in swampy lowlands, lakes, river channels, and floodplains. This formation is similar in age to the Lourinhã Formation in Portugal and the Tendaguru Formation in Tanzania.

The Morrison Formation records an environment and time dominated by gigantic sauropod dinosaurs. Other dinosaurs known from the Morrison include the theropods Koparion, Stokesosaurus, Ornitholestes, Allosaurus, and Torvosaurus, the sauropods Apatosaurus, Brachiosaurus, Camarasaurus, and Diplodocus, and the ornithischians Camptosaurus, Dryosaurus, Nanosaurus, Gargoyleosaurus, and Stegosaurus. Allosaurus, which accounted for 70 to 75% of all theropod specimens, was at the top trophic level of the Morrison food web. Other vertebrates that shared this paleoenvironment included ray-finned fishes, frogs, salamanders, turtles like Uluops, sphenodonts, lizards, terrestrial and aquatic crocodylomorphs such as Hoplosuchus, and several species of pterosaurs such as Harpactognathus and Mesadactylus. Shells of bivalves and aquatic snails are also common. The flora of the period has been revealed by fossils of green algae, fungi, mosses, horsetails, cycads, ginkgoes, and several families of conifers. Vegetation varied from river-lining forests of tree ferns and ferns (gallery forests) to fern savannas with occasional trees such as the Araucaria-like conifer Brachyphyllum.

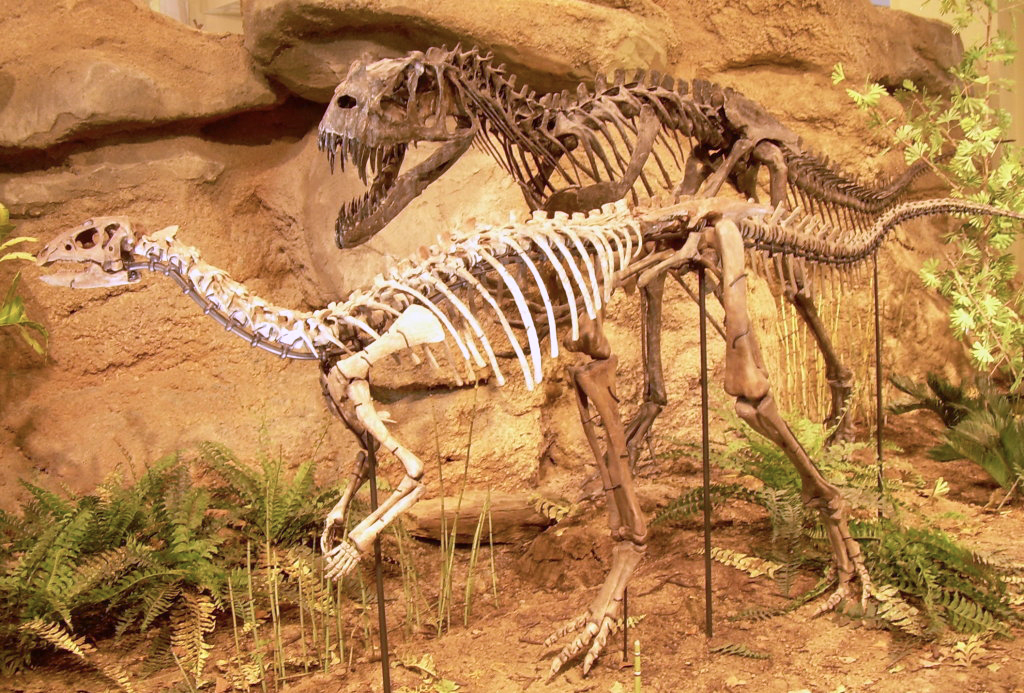
Juvenile Ceratosaurus mounted as if chasing Dryosaurus, Carnegie Museum

A partial Ceratosaurus specimen indicates the presence of the genus in the Portuguese Porto Novo Member of the Lourinhã Formation. Many of the dinosaurs of the Lourinhã Formation are either the same genera as those seen in the Morrison Formation or have a close counterpart. Besides Ceratosaurus, the researchers also noted that the presence of Allosaurus and Torvosaurus in the Portuguese rocks are primarily known from the Morrison, while Lourinhanosaurus has so far only been reported from Portugal. Herbivorous dinosaurs from the Porto Novo Member include, among others, the sauropods Dinheirosaurus and Zby, as well as the stegosaur Miragaia. During the Late Jurassic, Europe had just been separated from North America by the still narrow Atlantic Ocean. Portugal, as part of the Iberian Peninsula, was still separated from other parts of Europe. According to Mateus and colleagues, the similarity between the Portuguese and North American theropod faunas indicates the presence of a temporary land bridge, allowing for faunal interchange. Malafaia and colleagues, however, argued for a more complex scenario, as other groups, such as sauropods, turtles, and crocodiles, show clearly different species compositions in Portugal and North America. Thus, the incipient separation of these faunas could have led to interchange in some but allopatric speciation in other groups.

=== Niche partitioning ===
Within the Morrison and Lourinhã Formation, Ceratosaurus fossils are frequently found in association with those of other large theropods, including the megalosaurid Torvosaurus and the allosaurid Allosaurus. Felch Quarry contained both Ceratosaurus and Allosaurus. Dry Mesa Quarry, Cleveland-Lloyd Quarry, and Dinosaur National Monument feature fossils of Ceratosaurus, Allosaurus, and Torvosaurus. Likewise, Como Bluff and nearby localities contained remains of Ceratosaurus, Allosaurus, and at least one large megalosaurid. Ceratosaurus was a rare element of the theropod fauna, as it is outnumbered by Allosaurus at an average rate of 7.5 to 1 in sites where they co-occur.

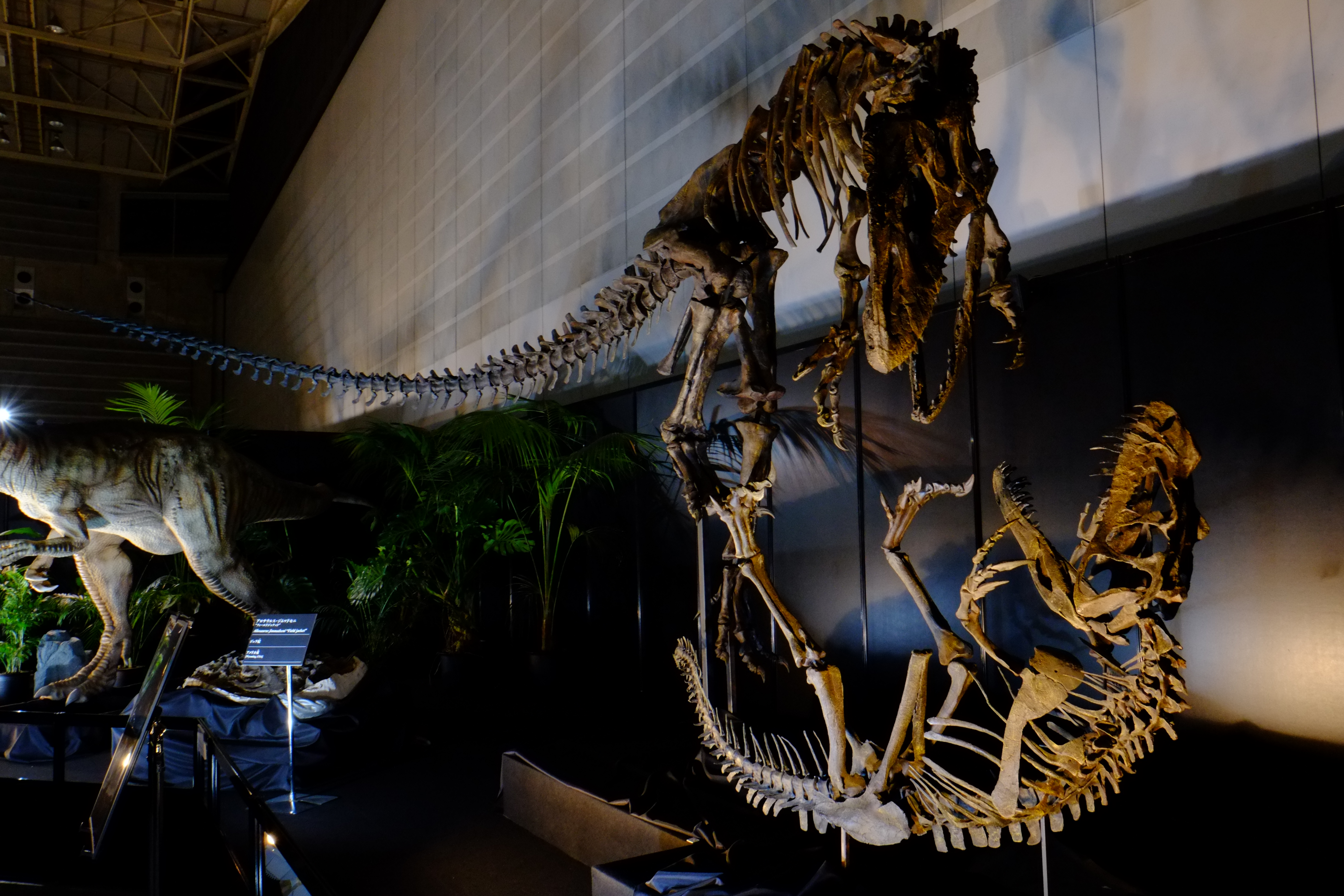
Reconstructed skeletons of Allosaurus and C. nasicornis in fighting postures, at Dinoworld Expo, Yokohama

Several studies attempted to explain how these sympatric species could have reduced direct competition. Donald Henderson, in 1998, argued that Ceratosaurus co-occurred with two potential species of Allosaurus: a short-snouted and a long-snouted form. The short-snouted form had a high and wide skull and short, backwards-projecting teeth, while the long-snouted morph had a lower skull and long, vertical teeth, similar to Ceratosaurus. Henderson proposed that Ceratosaurus was in direct competition with the long-snouted Allosaurus form, while the short-snouted Allosaurus form occupied a different ecological niche. If this was the case, Ceratosaurus might have been pushed out of habitats dominated by the long-snouted morph. The distinction between the two Allosaurus forms, however, was questioned by later studies, and the skull of USNM 4734, which formed the basis for Henderson's analysis of the short-snouted form, was later found to have been reconstructed too short.

Henderson also suggested that Ceratosaurus could have avoided competition by preferring different prey items, and that evolution of its extremely elongated teeth might have been a direct result of competition. The elongated teeth of Ceratosaurus could have served as visual signals facilitating the recognition of members of the same species or for other social functions. In addition, the large size of these theropods would have tended to decrease competition, as the number of possible prey items increases with size. Foster and Daniel Chure, in a 2006 study, concurred with Henderson that Ceratosaurus and Allosaurus generally shared the same habitats and preyed upon the same types of prey, meaning they likely had different feeding strategies to avoid competition. According to these researchers, this is also evidenced by different proportions of the skull, teeth, and arms. Yun, in 2019, proposed that Ceratosaurus might have relied more on aquatic prey than other theropods, had a narrow ecological niche, and was specialized in less productive habitats, which could also explain the general rarity of the genus. Oswald and Curtice, in their 2026 study, suggested that Ceratosaurus might have been specialized on smaller herbivorous dinosaurs that it could kill quickly with its long teeth, while Allosaurus might have been a generalist and Torvosaurus might have been specialized on sauropods.

== In popular culture ==
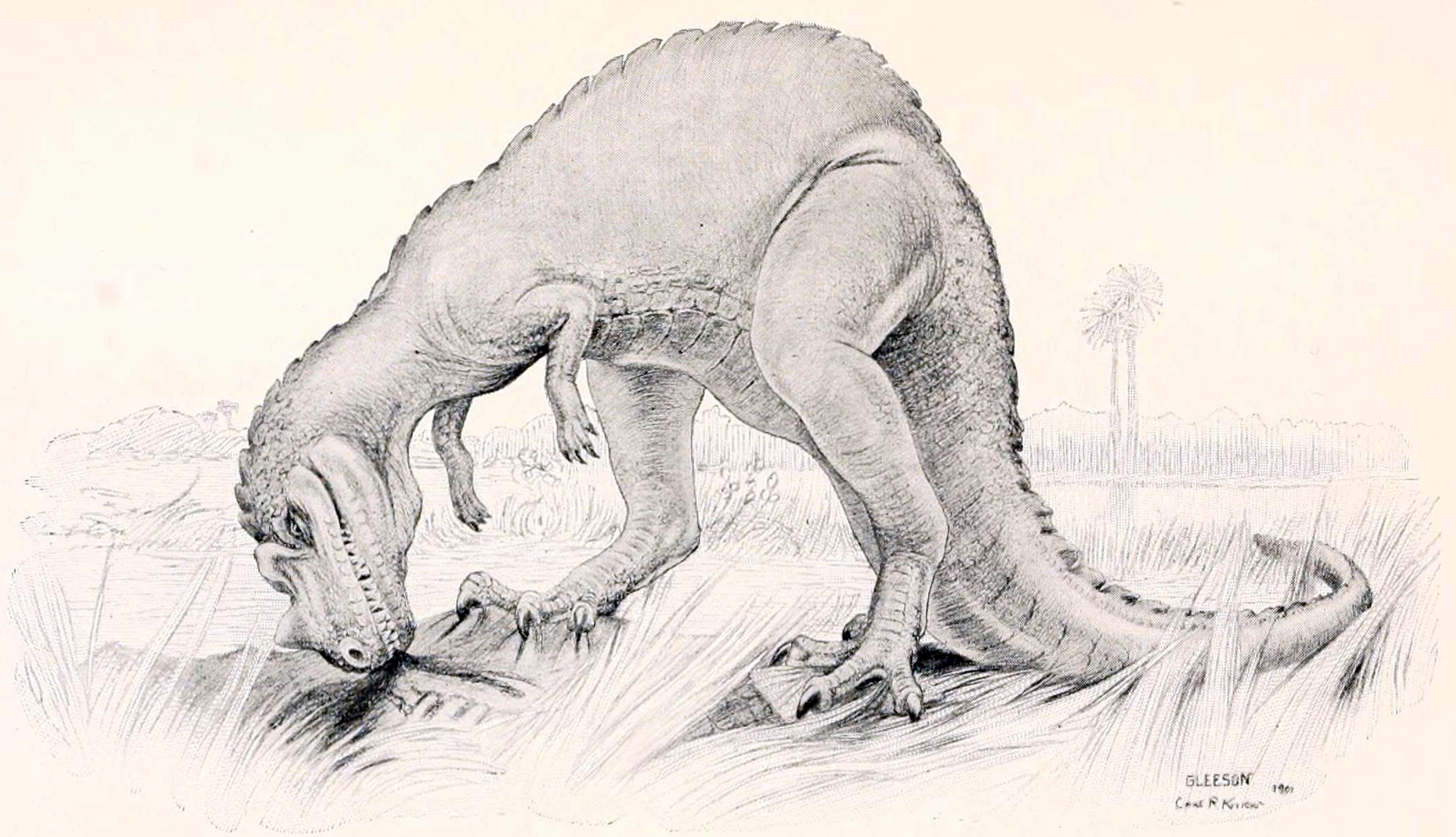
Historical restoration of C. nasicornis by Joseph M. Gleeson from 1901, made under supervision of Knight.

With its distinctive nasal horn, Ceratosaurus is amongst the more popular dinosaurs, and is regularly featured in popular books. It appeared in a number of novels, with examples including C.H. Murray Chapman's Dragons at home (1924) as well as a chapter in the first edition of T. H. White's The Sword in the Stone (1939), although that chapter was no longer present in subsequent editions. A life-sized model of Ceratosaurus threatens cave people in D. W. Griffith's 1914 silent movie Brute Force, possibly the first ever live-action dinosaur film. The movie perpetuated the public misconception that dinosaurs and humans coexisted and popularized the idea of dinosaurs indiscriminately attacking and killing. Ceratosaurus is also depicted in the 1956 documentary The Animal World by Irwin Allen, and the 1966 movie One Million Years B.C., where it is seen battling a Triceratops. More recently, one made an appearance in Jurassic Park III (2001).
