= Joseph M. Gleeson =

American painter and illustrator

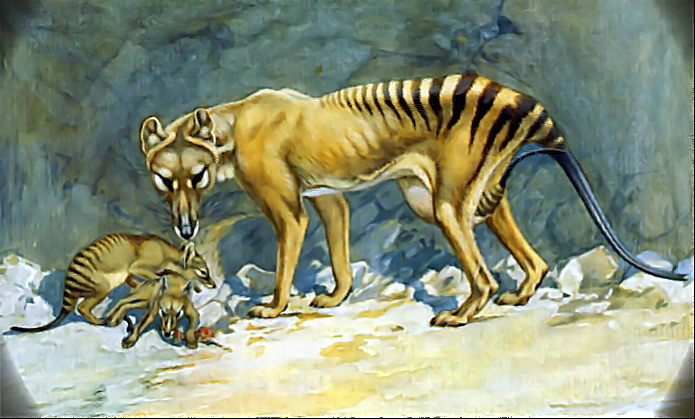
A painting by Joseph M. Gleeson depicts a thylacine mother with her cubs, from the Smithsonian National Zoo's specimens.1902.

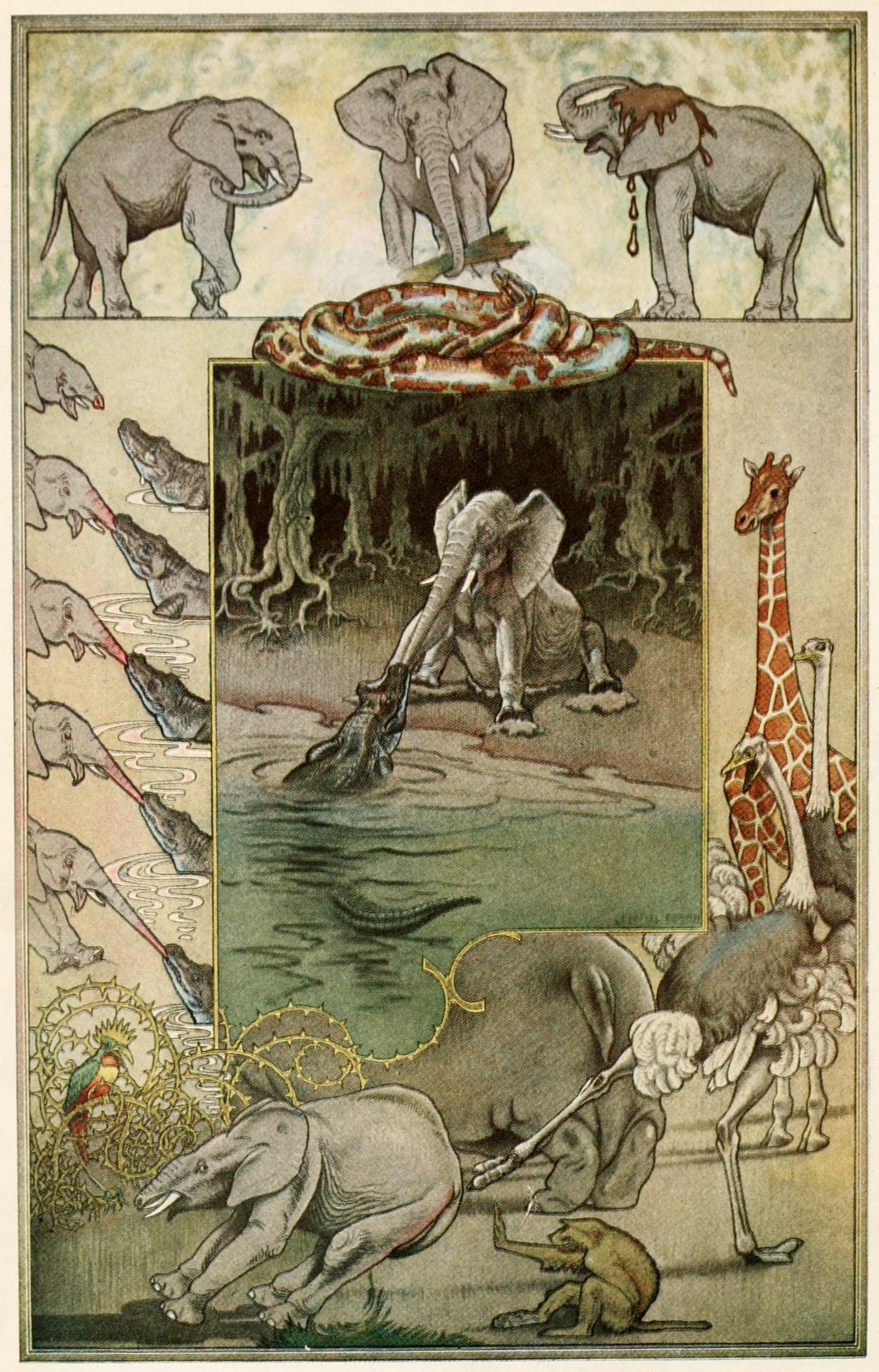
The Elephant's Child by Joseph M. Gleeson, from Just So Stories, 1912 edition

Joseph Michael Gleeson (1861 – September 26, 1917) was an American painter and illustrator. He is responsible for the only painting of the life of a thylacine and her cubs, from the National Zoo's specimens in 1902. He co-illustrated one of the earliest American editions of Just So Stories by Rudyard Kipling. Some of his works are now considered paleoart.

Gleeson died on September 26, 1917, in Ashburn, Virginia.
