= Carnegie Museum =

Carnegie Museum may refer to:

- Carnegie Museum of the Keweenaw, museum located in Michigan
- Carnegie Museum of Montgomery County, museum located in Indiana
- Carnegie Museums of Pittsburgh, a group of four museums in Pittsburgh, PA, including:
  - Carnegie Museum of Art
  - Carnegie Museum of Natural History
  - Carnegie Science Center
  - Andy Warhol Museum
