= 1916 in paleontology =

Paleontology or palaeontology is the study of prehistoric life forms on Earth through the examination of plant and animal fossils. This includes the study of body fossils, tracks (ichnites), burrows, cast-off parts, fossilised feces (coprolites), palynomorphs and chemical residues. Because humans have encountered fossils for millennia, paleontology has a long history both before and after becoming formalized as a science. This article records significant discoveries and events related to paleontology that occurred or were published in the year 1916.

== Plants ==
=== Newly named angiosperms ===
| Name | Novelty | Status | Authors | Age | Type locality | Location | Notes | Images |
|---|---|---|---|---|---|---|---|---|
| Florissantia | Gen et sp nov | jr synonym (pro part) | Knowlton | Late Eocene | Florissant Formation | United States; Colorado | A mallow relative. Type species F. physalis, jr synonym of Florissantia speirii (1886) | Florissantia speirii |
| Porana similis | Sp nov | jr synonym | Knowlton | Late Eocene | Florissant Formation | United States; Colorado | A mallow relative. jr synonym of Florissantia speirii (1992) | Florissantia speirii |

== Echinoderms ==
| Name | Novelty | Status | Authors | Age | Type locality | Location | Notes | Images |
|---|---|---|---|---|---|---|---|---|
| Argentinaster | Gen et sp nov | Valid | Ruedemann | Early Devonian | Talacasto Formation | Argentina | A brittle star belonging to the family Ophiurinidae, type species is A. bodenbenderi. | |
| Encrinaster yachalensis | Sp nov | Jr synonym | Ruedemann | Early Devonian | Talacasto Formation | Argentina | A brittle star belonging to the family Encrinasteridae, moved to the genus Marginaster in 1995, which was then renamed to Marginix in 2015. | |

== Fish ==
=== Bony fish ===
| Name | Novelty | Status | Authors | Age | Type locality | Location | Notes | Images |
|---|---|---|---|---|---|---|---|---|
| Lucious rosei | Sp nov | jr synonym | Hussakof | Eocene; Ypresian | Tranquille Formation | Canada; British Columbia | A moon eye relative. Moved to Eohiodon rosei (1966) moved to Hiodon rosei (2008) | |

== Dinosaurs ==
=== New taxa ===
| Name | Novelty | Status | Authors | Age | Type locality | Location | Notes | Images |
|---|---|---|---|---|---|---|---|---|
| Doryphorosaurus | Gen. nov. | Jr. synonym | Nopcsa | Late Jurassic | Tendaguru Formation | Tanzania | Unnecessary replacement name for Kentrosaurus | |
| Gigantoscelus molengraaffi | Gen. et sp. nov. | Nomen dubium | van Hoepen | Early Jurassic | Bushveld Sandstone Formation | South Africa | A prosauropod | |
| Kentrurosaurus | Gen. nov. | Jr. synonym | Hennig | Late Jurassic | Tendaguru Formation | Tanzania | Unnecessary replacement name for Kentrosaurus | |
| Prosaurolophus maximus | Gen. et sp. nov. | Valid | Brown | Campanian | Dinosaur Park Formation | Canada; Alberta) | A hadrosaurid | |

== Plesiosaurs ==
=== Newly named taxa ===
| Name | Novelty | Status | Authors | Age | Type locality | Location | Notes | Images |
|---|---|---|---|---|---|---|---|---|
| Apractocleidus | Gen nov | jr synonym | Smellie | | | | jr synonym of Cryptocleidus | Cryptoclidus eurymerus |

== Synapsids ==
=== Non-mammalian ===
| Name | Novelty | Status | Authors | Age | Type locality | Country/state | Notes | Images |
|---|---|---|---|---|---|---|---|---|
| Jonkeria | Gen et sp nov | Valid | Van Hoepen | Capitanian | Abrahamskraal Formation | South Africa | A titanosuchid dinocephalian Type species J. truculenta | Jonkeria |
