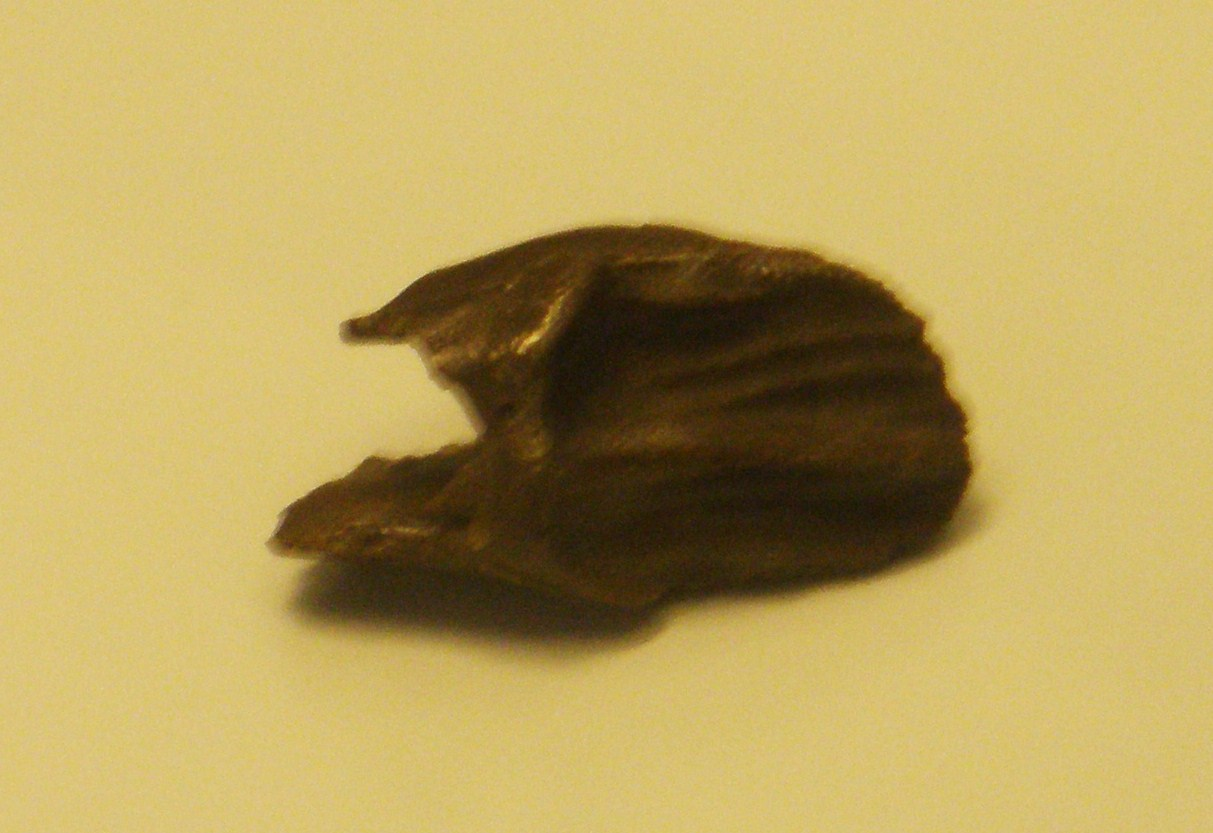
- Tooth from the holotype of C. lonzeensis

Scientific classification
- Kingdom: Animalia
- Phylum: Chordata
- Class: Reptilia
- Clade: Dinosauria
- Clade: †Ornithischia
- Clade: †Ceratopsia (?)
- Genus: †Craspedodon; Dollo, 1883

Type species
- †Craspedodon lonzeensis Dollo, 1883

Synonyms
- Craspedon Galton, 1980

= Craspedodon =

Craspedodon Temporal range: Late Cretaceous, Santonian

Extinct genus of dinosaurs

Craspedodon (meaning 'edge tooth') is an extinct genus of ornithischian dinosaur from the Late Cretaceous Lonzée Member of Belgium. Only a single species, C. lonzeensis, is known.

== Discovery and naming ==
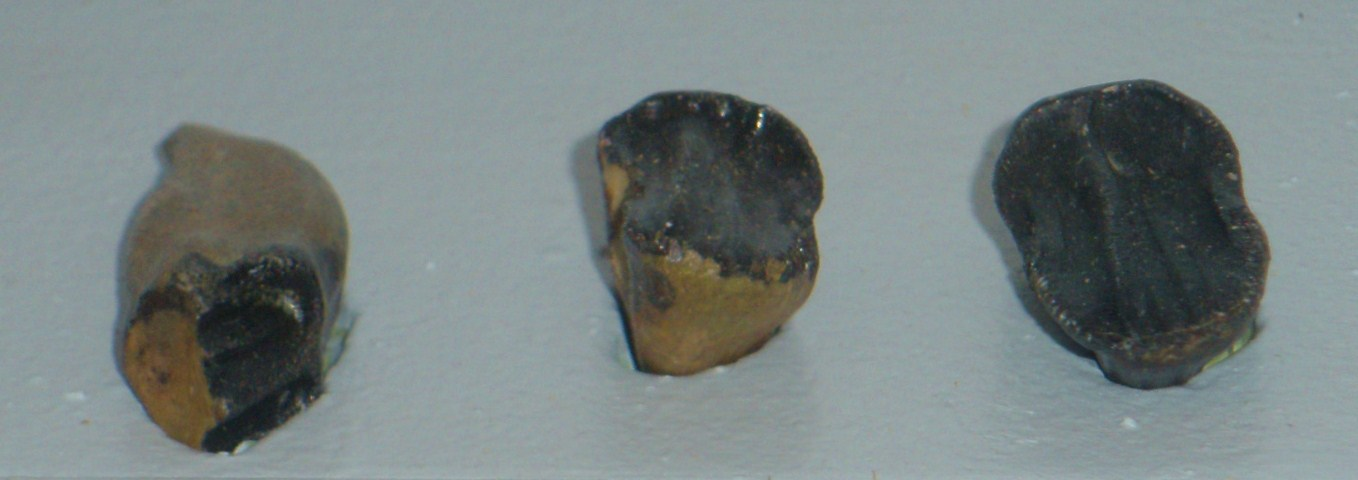
IRSN R 59 (left), a tooth from ISRNB R. 58 (middle) and IRSN R 105 (right)

In 1883 Belgian paleontologist Louis Dollo described the fauna found in the Late Cretaceous of Belgium near Lonzée, naming the theropod species Megalosaurus lonzeensis and the new herbivorous dinosaur Craspedodon lonzeensis. Dollo identified Craspedodon from three teeth in the collections of the Museum of Natural Sciences in Brussels, from the Lonzée Member, finding the most similarities with species of Iguanodon amongst ornithischians. The genus name is a reference to the strong ridges that cross the teeth, while the species name is a reference to the locality where it was found. Dollo specified the Lonzée Member as being middle Senonian in age, which is now understood to be Coniacian to Santonian.

Since its description, Craspedodon was considered an ornithopod following the relationship with Iguanodon suggested by Dollo, but this was revisited in 2007 by Belgian paleontologists Pascal Godefroit and Olivier Lambert. Godefroit and Lambert identified that the three teeth described by Dollo are IRSNB R57, R58 and R59, and rather than being an ornithopod, are actually some of the earliest evidence of Neoceratopsia from Europe. They were unable to determine whether Craspedodon was a diagnostic taxon or a nomen dubium, identifying some features that suggest separation but also noting that tooth anatomy is too poorly understood to be definitive.

== Classification ==
Craspedodon was long thought to be an iguanodontian, but Godefroit & Lambert (2007) suggested that it was actually a neoceratopsian, perhaps closer to Ceratopsoidea than Protoceratopsidae.

If the reidentification is correct, Craspedodon would be the first neoceratopsian known from Europe. However, the describers of Ajkaceratops noted that Craspedodon might instead represent a hadrosauroid ornithopod.
