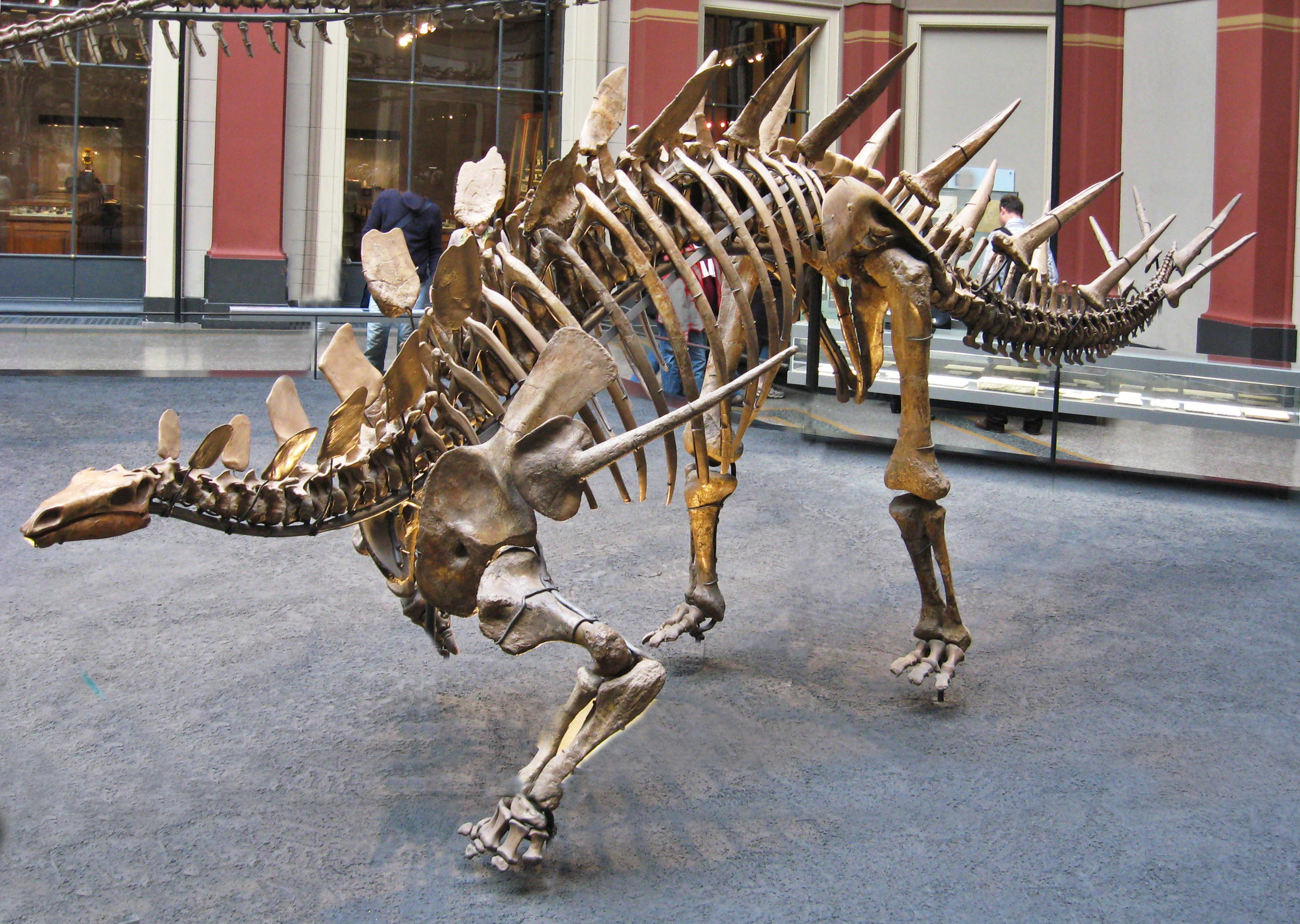
- Mounted skeleton, Museum für Naturkunde, Berlin

Scientific classification
- Kingdom: Animalia
- Phylum: Chordata
- Class: Reptilia
- Clade: Dinosauria
- Clade: †Ornithischia
- Clade: †Thyreophora
- Clade: †Stegosauria
- Family: †Stegosauridae
- Genus: †Kentrosaurus; Hennig, 1915

Type species
- †Kentrosaurus aethiopicus Hennig, 1915

Synonyms
- Kentrurosaurus Hennig, 1916; Doryphorosaurus Nopcsa, 1916

= Kentrosaurus =

Kentrosaurus Temporal range: Late Jurassic (Kimmeridgian to Tithonian), 152 Ma

Genus of stegosaurian dinosaur

Kentrosaurus (/ˌkɛntroʊˈsɔːrəs/ KEN-troh-SOR-əs; lit. 'prickle lizard') is a genus of stegosaurid dinosaur from the Late Jurassic in Lindi Region of Tanzania. The type species is K. aethiopicus, named and described by German palaeontologist Edwin Hennig in 1915. Often thought to be a "primitive" member of the Stegosauria, several recent cladistic analyses find it as more derived than many other stegosaurs, and a close relative of Stegosaurus from the North American Morrison Formation within the Stegosauridae.

Fossils of K. aethiopicus have been found only in the Tendaguru Formation, dated to the late Kimmeridgian and early Tithonian ages, about 152 million years ago. Hundreds of bones were unearthed by German expeditions to German East Africa between 1909 and 1912. Although no complete skeletons are known, the remains provided a nearly complete picture of the build of the animal. In the Tendaguru Formation, it coexisted with a variety of dinosaurs such as the carnivorous theropods Elaphrosaurus and Veterupristisaurus, giant herbivorous sauropods Giraffatitan and Tornieria, and the dryosaurid Dysalotosaurus.

Kentrosaurus generally measured around 4–4.5 metres (13–15 ft) in length as an adult, and weighed about 700–1,600 kilograms (1,500–3,500 lb). It walked on all fours with straight hindlimbs. It had a small, elongated head with a beak used to bite off plant material that would be digested in a large gut. It had a, probably double, row of small plates running down its neck and back. These plates gradually merged into spikes on the hip and tail. The longest spikes were on the tail end and were used to actively defend the animal. There also was a long spike on each shoulder. The thigh bones come in two different types, suggesting that one sex was larger and more stout than the other.

== Discovery and naming ==
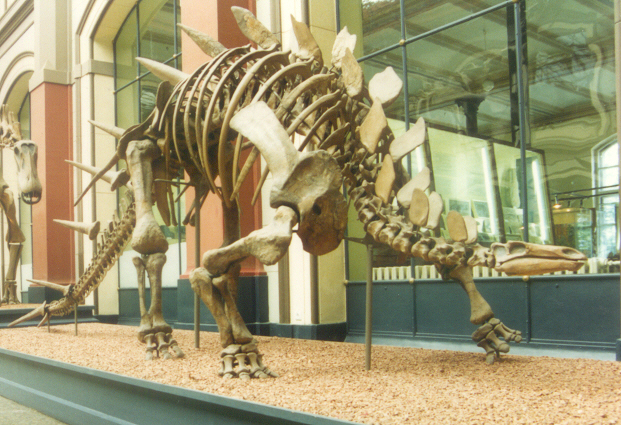
Outdated skeletal mount (lectotype and paralectotypes), Museum für Naturkunde. This mount was erected in 1925 and was disassembled in 2006. In 2007 it was reassembled with a slightly altered posture

The first fossils of Kentrosaurus were discovered by the German Tendaguru Expedition in 1909, recognised as belonging to a stegosaur by expedition leader Werner Janensch on 24 July 1910, and described by German palaeontologist Edwin Hennig in 1915. The name Kentrosaurus was coined by Hennig and comes from the Greek kentron/κέντρον, meaning "sharp point" or "prickle", and sauros/σαῦρος meaning "lizard", Hennig added the specific name aethiopicus to denote the provenance from Africa. Soon after its description, a controversy arose over the stegosaur's name, which is very similar to the ceratopsian Centrosaurus. Under the rules of biological nomenclature, forbidding homonymy, two animals may not be given the same name. Hennig renamed his stegosaur Kentrurosaurus, "pointed-tail lizard", in 1916, while Hungarian paleontologist Franz Nopcsa renamed the genus Doryphorosaurus, "lance-bearing lizard", the same year. If a renaming had been necessary, Hennig's would have had priority. However, because the spelling is different, both Doryphorosaurus and Kentrurosaurus are unneeded replacement names; Kentrosaurus remains the valid name for the genus with Kentrurosaurus and Doryphorosaurus being its junior objective synonyms.

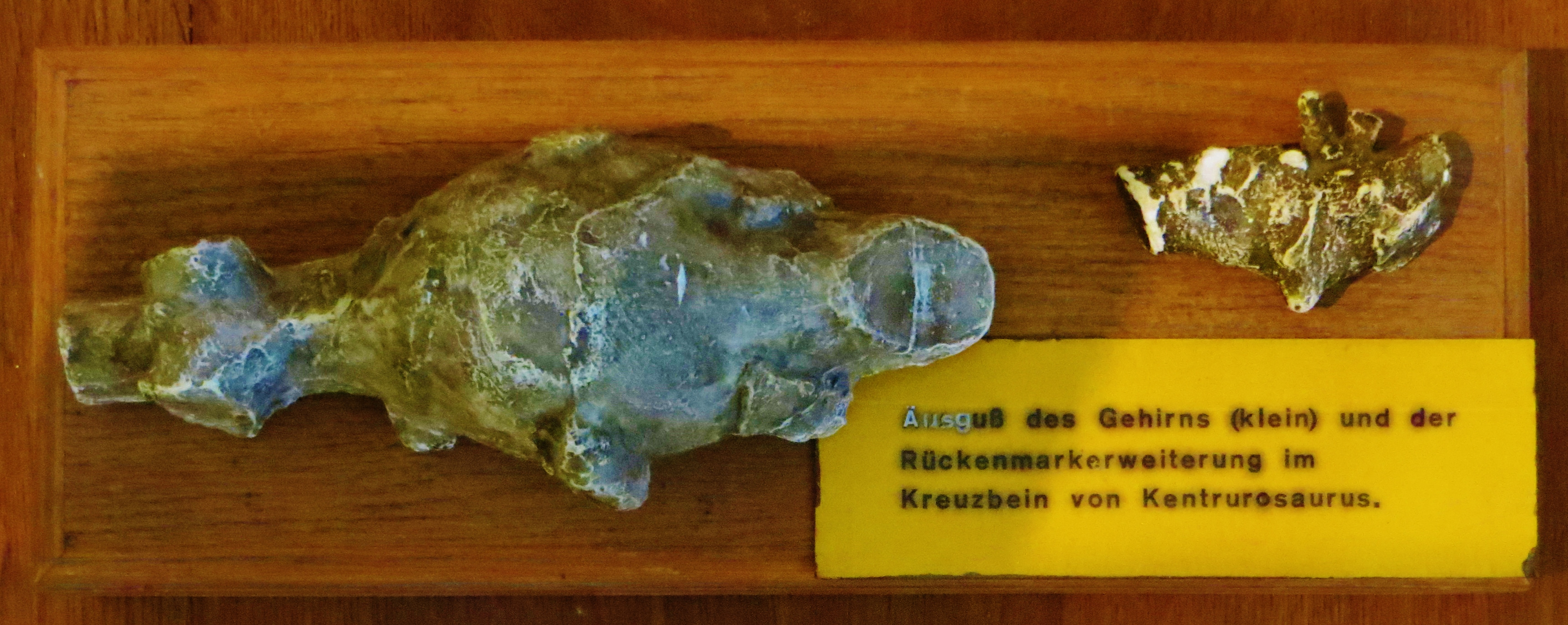
Endocasts of the sacral ganglion and brain at Museum of Paleontology of Tübingen.

Although no complete individuals were found, some material was discovered in association, including a nearly complete tail, hip, several dorsal vertebrae and some limb elements of one individual. These form the core of a mount in the Museum für Naturkunde by Janensch. The mount was dismantled during the museum renovation in 2006/2007, and re-mounted in an improved pose by Research Casting International. Some other material, including a braincase and spine, was thought to have been misplaced or destroyed during World War II. However, all the supposedly lost cranial material was later found in a drawer of a basement cupboard.

From 1909 onwards, Kentrosaurus remains were uncovered in four quarries in the Mittlere Saurierschichten (Middle Saurian Beds) and one quarry in the Obere Saurierschichten (Upper Saurian Beds). During four field seasons, the German Expedition found over 1200 bones of Kentrosaurus, belonging to about fifty individuals, many of which were destroyed during the Second World War. Today, almost all remaining material is housed in the Museum für Naturkunde Berlin (roughly 350 remaining specimens), while the museum of the Institute for Geosciences of the University of Tübingen houses a composite mount, roughly 50% of it being original bones.

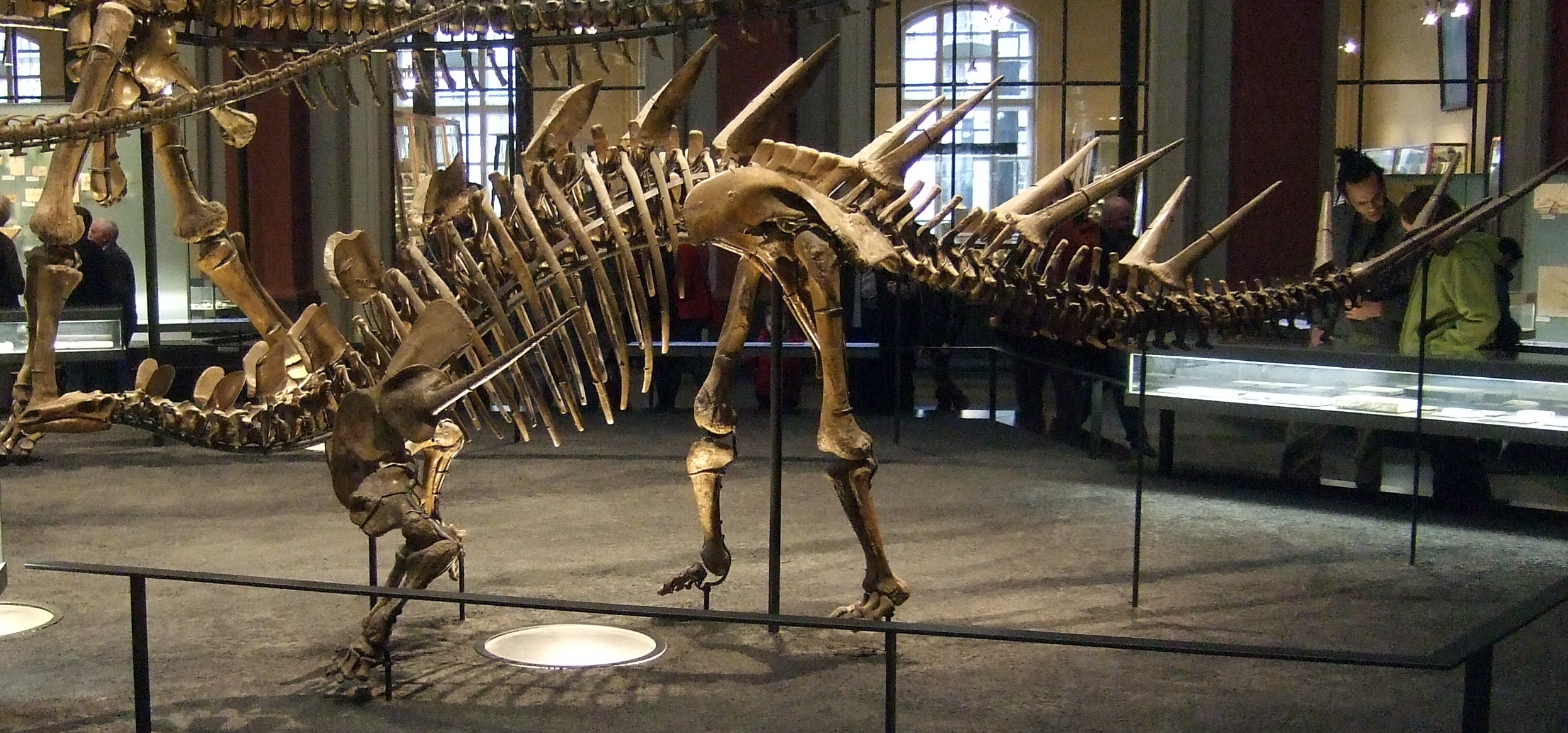
Lateral view of a skeleton on display at the Museum für Naturkunde, Berlin

In the original description, Hennig did not designate a holotype specimen. However, in a detailed monography on the osteology, systematic position and palaeobiology of Kentrosaurus in 1925, Hennig picked the most complete partial skeleton, today inventorised as MB.R.4800.1 through MB.R.4800.37, as a lectotype (see syntype). This material includes a nearly complete series of tail vertebrae, several vertebrae of the back, a sacrum with five sacral vertebrae and both ilia, both femora and an ulna, and is included in the mounted skeleton at the Museum für Naturkunde in Berlin, Germany. The type locality is Kindope, Tanzania, north of Tendaguru hill.

Unaware that Hennig had already defined a lectotype, Peter Galton selected two dorsal vertebrae, specimens MB.R.1930 and MB.R.1931, from the material figured in Hennig's 1915 description, as 'holotypes'. This definition of a holotype is not valid, because Hennig's selection has priority. In 2011, Heinrich Mallison clarified that all the material known to Hennig in 1915, i.e. all the bones discovered before 1912, when Hermann Heck concluded the last German excavations, are paralectotypes, and that MB.R.4800 is the correct lectotype.

== Description ==
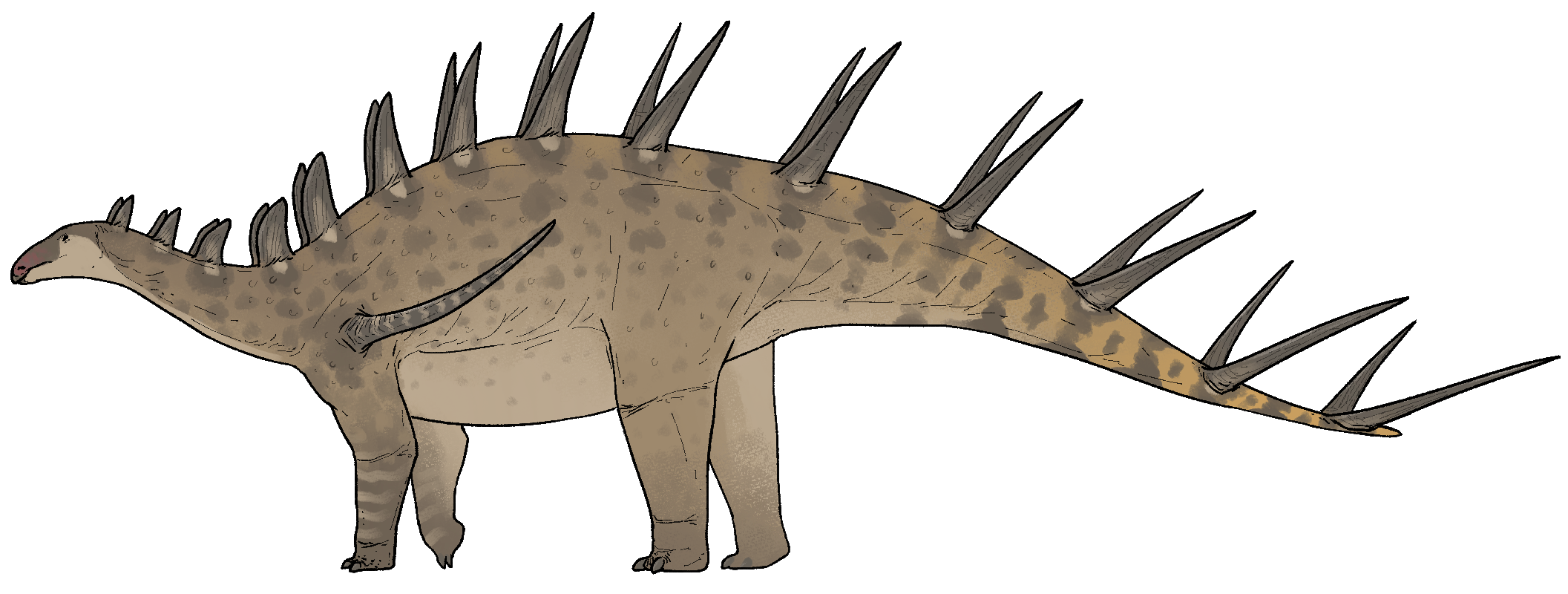
Life restoration

Kentrosaurus was a small stegosaur. It had the typical dinosaurian body bauplan, characterised by a small head, a long neck, short forelimbs and long hindlimbs, and a long, horizontal and muscular tail. Typical stegosaurid traits included the elongation and flatness of the head, the powerful build of the forelimbs, erect and pillar-like hindlimbs and an array of plates and spikes running along both sides of the top mid-line of the animal.

=== Size and posture ===
Size compared to a human

Kentrosaurus aethiopicus was a relatively small stegosaur, reaching 4–5 m (13–16 ft) in length and 700–1,600 kg (1,500–3,500 lb) in body mass. (Note: p. 223 in Paul (2010)) Some specimens suggest that relatively larger individuals could have existed. These specimens are comparable to some Stegosaurus specimens in terms of the olecranon process in development.

The long tail of Kentrosaurus results in a position of the center of mass that is unusually far back for a quadrupedal animal. It rests just in front of the hip, a position usually seen in bipedal dinosaurs. However, the femora are straight in Kentrosaurus, as opposed to typical bipeds, indicating a straight and vertical limb position. Thus, the hindlimbs, though powered by massive thigh muscles attached to a long ilium, did not support the animal alone, and the very robust forelimbs took up 10 to 15% of the bodyweight. The center of mass was not heavily modified by the osteoderms (bony structures in skin) in Kentrosaurus or Stegosaurus, which allowed the animals to stay mobile despite their armament. The hindlimbs' thigh muscles were very powerful, allowing Kentrosaurus to reach a tripod stance on its hindlegs and tail.

=== Skull and dentition ===
Eight specimens from the skull, mandible, and teeth have been collected and described from the Tendaguru Formation, most of them being isolated elements. Two quadrates (bones from the jaw joint) were referred to Kentrosaurus, but they instead belong to a juvenile brachiosaurid.

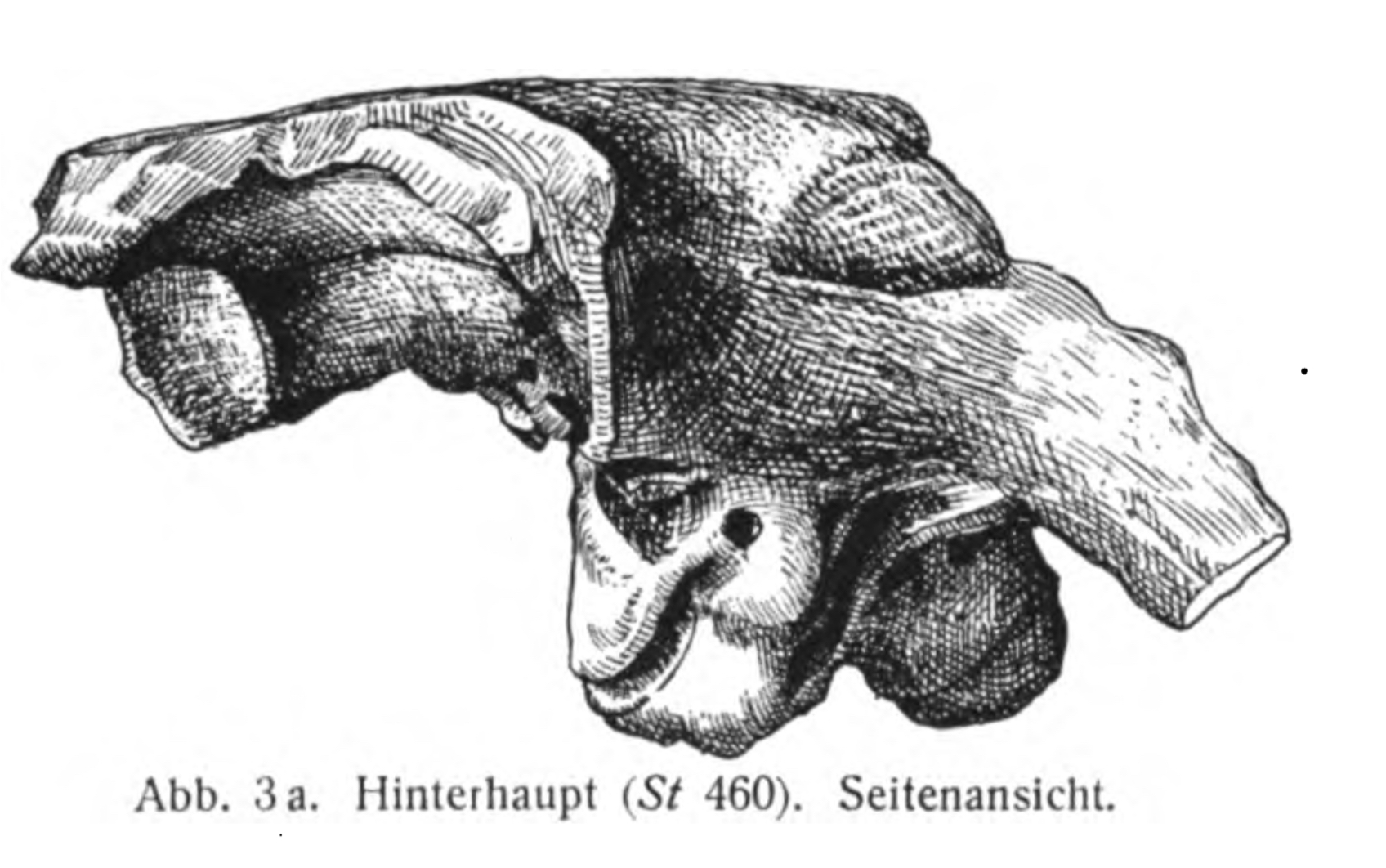
Braincase of Kentrosaurus in lateral view.

The long and narrow skull was small in proportion to the body. It had a small antorbital fenestra, the hole between the nose and eye common to most archosaurs, including modern birds, though lost in extant crocodylians. The skull's low position suggests that Kentrosaurus may have been a browser of low-growing vegetation. This interpretation is supported by the absence of premaxillary teeth and their likely replacement by a horny beak or rhamphotheca. The presence of a beak extended along much of the jaws may have precluded the presence of cheeks in stegosaurs. Due to its phylogenetic position, it is unlikely that Kentrosaurus had an extensive beak like Stegosaurus and it instead probably had a beak restricted to the jaw tips. Other researchers have interpreted these ridges as modified versions of similar structures in other ornithischians which might have supported fleshy cheeks, rather than beaks.

There are two nearly complete braincases known from Kentrosaurus though they exhibit some taphonomic distortion. The frontals and parietals are flat and broad, with the latter bearing two transversely concave ventral sides with a ridge running down the middle that divides them. The lateral surface of the frontals form part of the orbit (eye socket) and the medial side creates the anterior part of the endocranial cavity (braincase). Basioccipitals (where the skull articulated with the cervical vertebrae) form the posterior floor of the brain and the occipital condyle, which is large and spherical in Kentrosaurus. The rest of the braincase is formed by the presphenoid composing the anterior end. The overall braincase morphology is very similar to those of Tuojiangosaurus, Huayangosaurus, and Stegosaurus. However, the occipital condyle is a closer distance to the basisphenoid tubera (bone at the front of the braincase) in Kentrosaurus and Huayangosaurus than in Tuojiangosaurus and some specimens of Stegosaurus. Due to dinosaurs having more molding in their braincases, endocasts of Kentrosaurus can be reconstructed using the preserved fossils. The brain is relatively short, deep, and small, with a strong cerebral and pontine flexures and a steeply inclined posterodorsal edge when compared to those of other ornithischians. There is a small dorsal projection in the endocast where an unossified (lacking bone) region between the top of the supraoccipital (bone at the top-back of the braincase) and overlying parietal that was likely covered in cartilage. This characteristic is seen in other ornithischians. Because of the prominent flexures, many of the aspects of the brain can only be interpreted by the present structures.

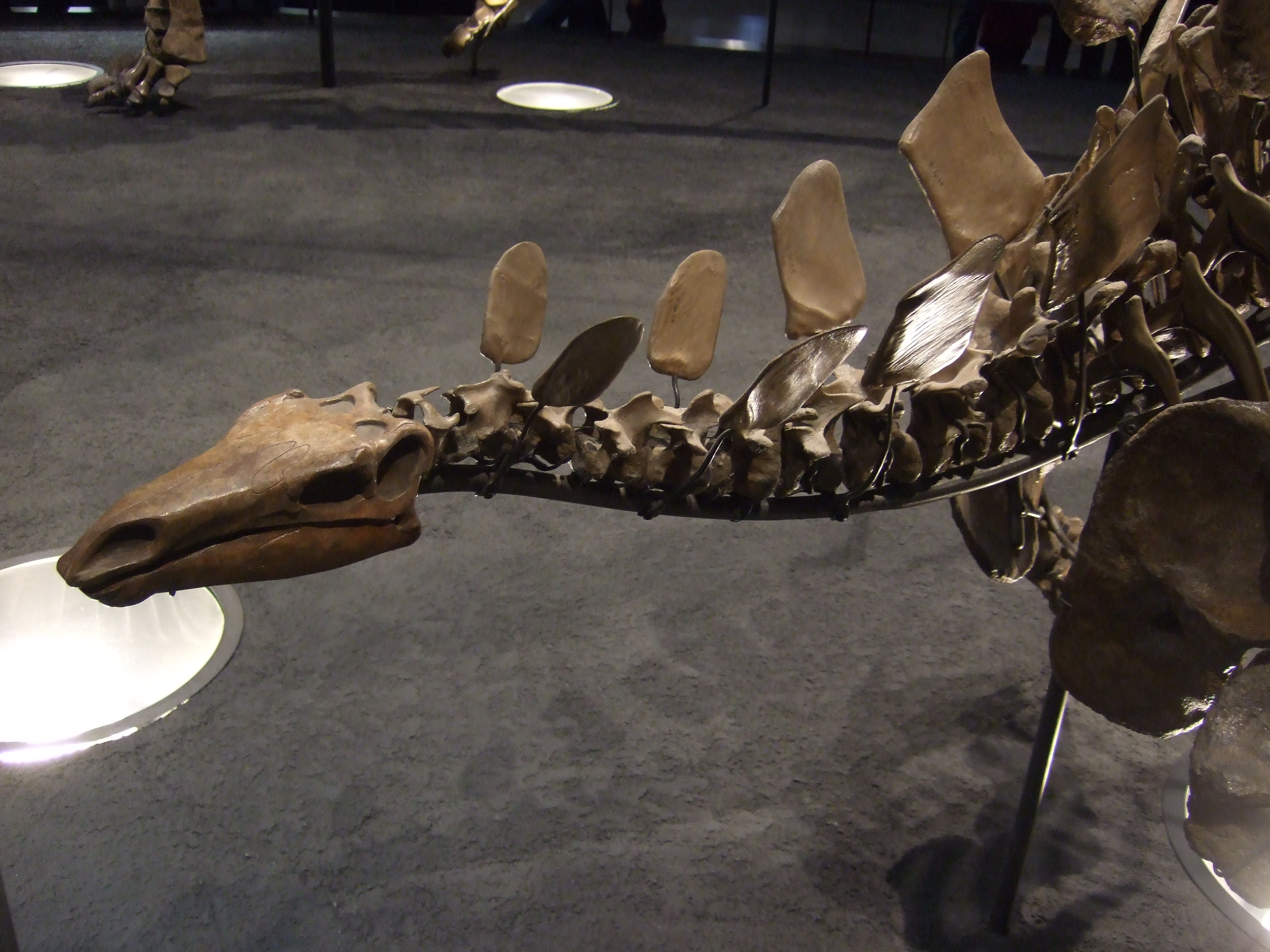
Skull and neck of the Berlin mount

In the mandible (lower jaw), only an incomplete right dentary is known from Kentrosaurus. The deep dentary is almost identical in shape to that of Stegosaurus, albeit much smaller. Similarly, the tooth is a typical stegosaurian tooth, small with a widened base and vertical grooves creating five ridges. The dentary has 13 preserved alveoli on the dorsomedial side and they are slightly convex in lateral and dorsal views. On the surface adjacent to the alveoli, there is a shallow groove bearing small foramina (small openings in bone) that is similar to grooves on the dentary of the Cretaceous neornithischian Hypsilophodon, with one foramina per tooth position. Stegosaurian teeth were small, triangular, and flat; wear facets show that they did grind their food. A single complete cheek tooth is preserved, with a large crown and long root. The crown notably has fewer marginal denticles and a prominent cingulum compared to Stegosaurus, Tuojiangosaurus, and Huayangosaurus.

=== Postcrania ===
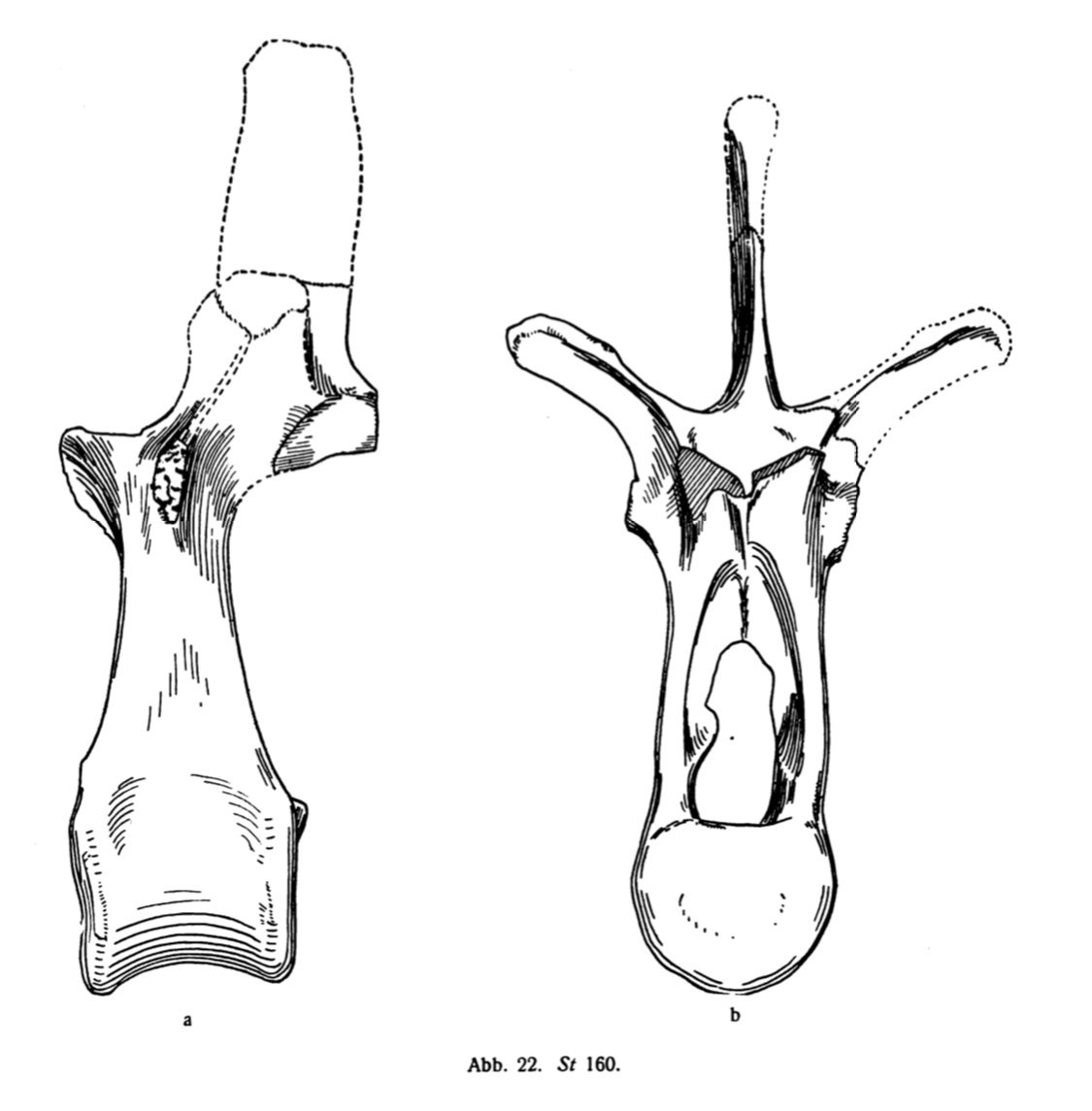
A dorsal (back) vertebra of Kentrosaurus in lateral and anterior views.

The neck was composed of 13 cervical (neck) vertebrae, the first being the atlas which was strongly fused to the occipital region of the skull and followed by the axis. The other 11 cervicals had hourglass-shaped centra (the base of a vertebra) and rounded ventral keels. The diapophyses are large and strongly angled posteriorily and parallel to each other. The spinous processes got larger towards the posterior end, while the postzygapophyses became smaller and less horizontal, giving the anterior part of the neck lots of mobility laterally. The dorsal column consists of 13 dorsal (back) vertebrae which are tall and have short centra. They have a neural arch more than twice as high as the centrum, the vertebral body, and almost completely occupied by the extremely spacious neural canal, a trait unique to Kentrosaurus. The diapophyses too were laterally elongated, creating a Y-shape in anterior view. The sacrum (part of pelvis with vertebrae) consists of 6 fused centra, the first being a loose sacrodorsal, while the rest of the centra's transverse processes (extensions of bone) are fused to the dorsal parts of the sacral ribs into a solid sacral plate. The ribs also fuse to the ilium (the upper part of the pelvis) creating a fully ankylosed and solid sacrum. The ilium is notable in that the preacetabular process, front blade, of the ilium widens laterally, to the front outer side, and does not taper unlike in all other stegosaurs. Another characteristic is that the length of the ilium equals, or is greater than, that of the thigh bone. The caudal (tail) vertebrae are 29 in number, though 27-29 are coossified for attachment to the thagomizers (tail spikes). The caudal vertebrae are unique, as they have a combination of transverse processes up to the 28th vertebra and rod-shaped processes on the posterior caudals. These posterior caudal processes have narrow bases that do not tough the plate formed by the fusion of the processes of the sacral vertebrae. Kentrosaurus can be distinguished from other members of the Stegosauria by a number of processes of the vertebrae, which in the tail do not run sub-parallel, as in most dinosaurs. In the front third of the tail, they point backwards, the usual direction. In the middle tail, however, they are almost vertical, and further back they are hook-shaped and point obliquely forward. The chevrons, bones pointing to below from the bottom side of the tail vertebrae, have the shape of an inverted T.

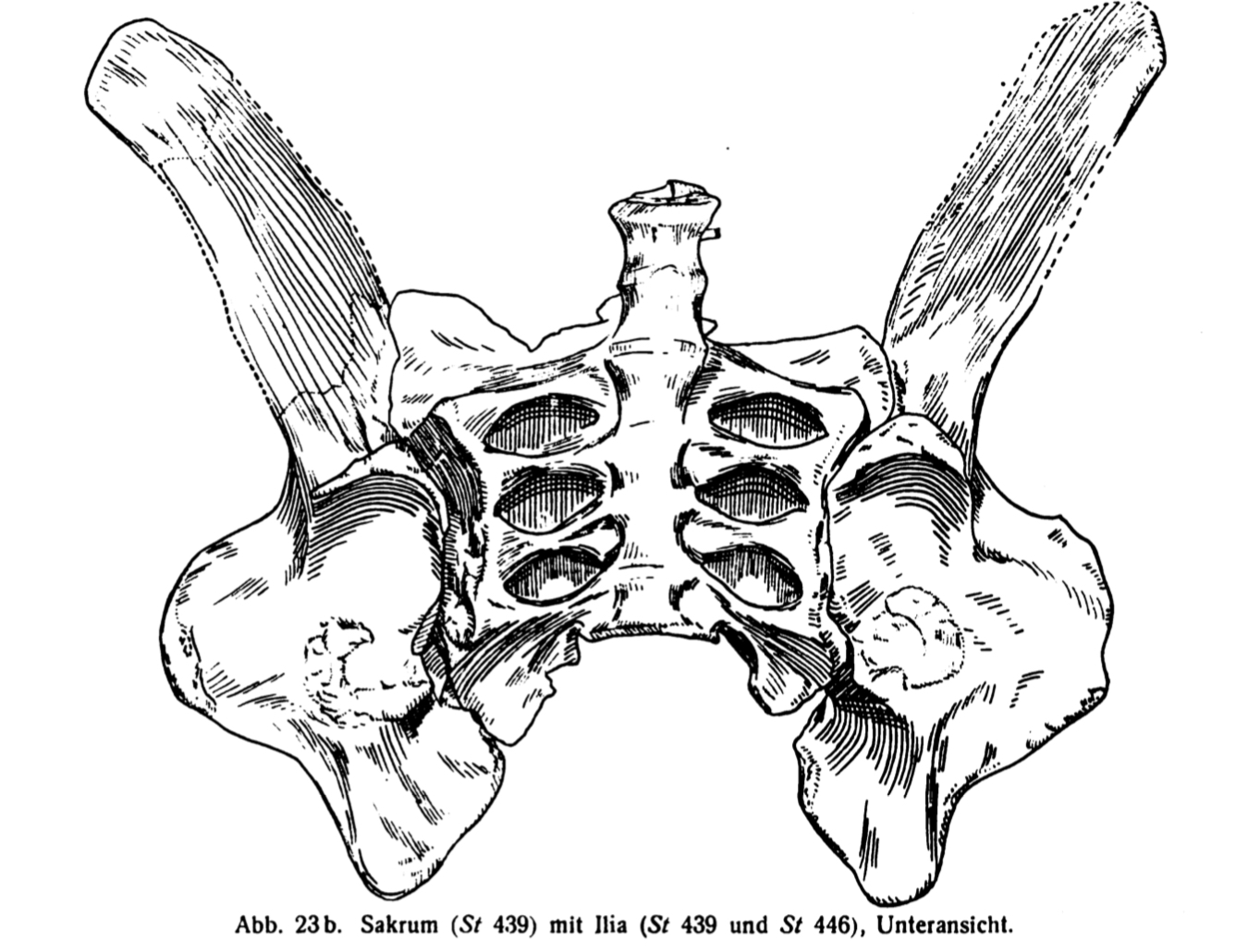
Sacrum of Kentrosaurus in ventral view.

The scapula (shoulder blade) is sub-rectangular, with a robust blade. Though it is not always perfectly preserved, the acromion ridge is slightly smaller than in Stegosaurus. The blade is relatively straight, although it curves towards the back. There is a small bump on the back of the blade, that would have served as the base of the triceps muscle. The coracoid is sub-circular. The fore limbs were much shorter than the stocky hind limbs, which resulted in an unusual posture. The humerus (upper arm bone), like other stegosaurs, has greatly expanded proximal and distal ends that were attachment points between the coracoid and ulna-radius (forearm bones) respectively. The radius was larger than the ulna and had a wedge-shaped proximal end. The manus (hand) was small and had five toes with 2 toes bearing only a single phalange. The hindlimbs were much larger and too are similar to those of other stegosaurs. The femur (thigh bone) is the longest element in the body, with the largest known femur measuring 665 mm from the proximal to distal end. The tibia (shin bone) was wide and robust, while the fibula was skinny and thin without a greatly expanded distal end. The pes (foot) terminated in 3 toes, all of which had hoof-like unguals (claws).

=== Armour ===
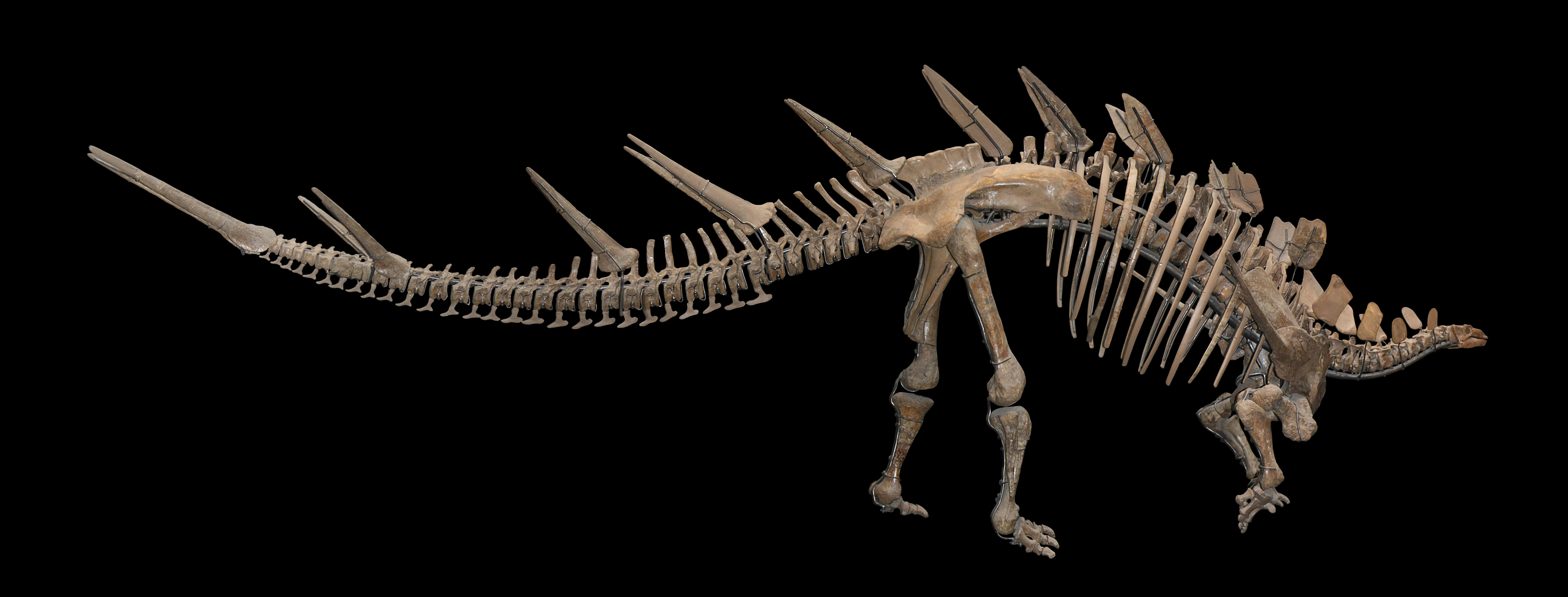
Lectotype, partial individual from excavation 'St' at Kindope, Tendaguru, Tanzania

Typically for a stegosaur, Kentrosaurus had extensive osteoderm (bony structures in the skin) covering, including small plates (probably located on the neck and anterior trunk), and spikes of various shapes. The spikes of Kentrosaurus are very elongated, with one specimen having a bone core length of 731 millimetres. The plates have a thickened section in the middle, as if they were modified spines. The spikes and plates were likely covered by horn. Aside from a few exceptions they were not found in close association with other skeletal remains. Thus, the exact position of most osteoderms is uncertain. A pair of closely spaced spikes was found articulated with a tail tip, and a number of spikes were found apparently regularly spaced in pairs along the path of an articulated tail.

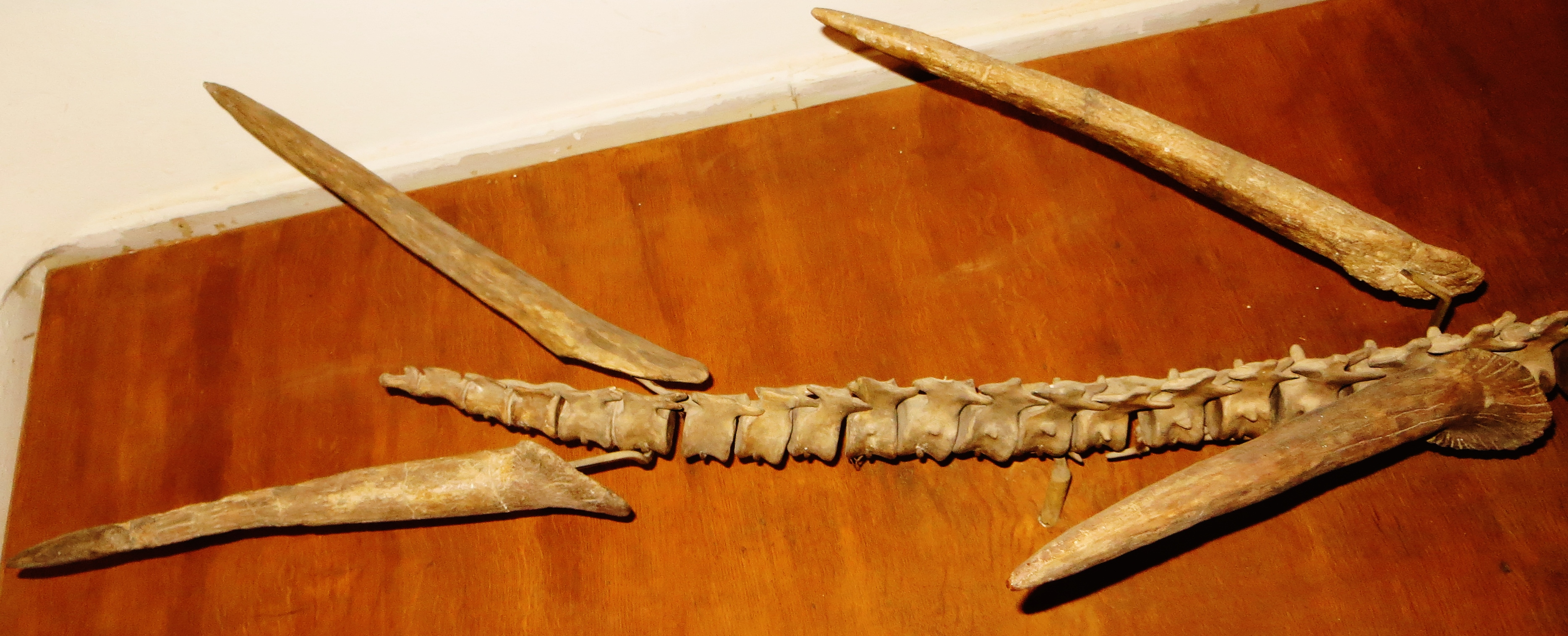
Thagomizer at the Museum of Palaeontology of Tübingen

Hennig and Janensch, while grouping the dermal armour elements into four distinct types, recognised an apparently continuous change of shape among them, shorter and flatter plates at the front gradually merging into longer and more pointed spikes towards the rear, suggesting an uninterrupted distribution along the entire body, in fifteen pairs. Because each type of osteoderm was found in mirrored left and right versions, it seems probable that all types of osteoderms were distributed in two rows along the back of the animal, a marked contrast to the better-known North American Stegosaurus, which had one row of plates on the neck, trunk and tail, and two rows of spikes on the tail tip. There is one type of spike that differs from all others in being strongly, and not only slightly, asymmetrical, and having a very broad base. Because of bone morphology classic reconstructions placed it on the hips, at the iliac blade, while many recent reconstructions place it on the shoulder, because a similarly shaped spike is known to have existed on the shoulder in the Chinese stegosaurs Gigantspinosaurus and Huayangosaurus.

== Classification and species ==
Like the spikes and shields of ankylosaurs, the bony plates and spines of stegosaurians evolved from the low-keeled osteoderms characteristic of basal thyreophorans. Galton (2019) interpreted plates of an armored dinosaur from the Lower Jurassic (Sinemurian-Pliensbachian) Lower Kota Formation of India as fossils of a member of Ankylosauria; the author argued that this finding indicates a probable early Early Jurassic origin for both Ankylosauria and its sister group Stegosauria.

The vast majority of stegosaurian dinosaurs thus far recovered belong to the Stegosauridae, which lived in the later part of the Jurassic and early Cretaceous, and which were defined by Paul Sereno as all stegosaurians more closely related to Stegosaurus than to Huayangosaurus. This group is widespread, with members across the Northern Hemisphere, Africa and possibly South America. The South American remains come from Chubut, Argentina and consist only of a partial humerus, but the anatomy of the humerus is very similar to that of Kentrosaurus and both date to the Late Jurassic. In a phylogenetic analysis, the Chubut stegosaurid was recovered in polytomy with Kentrosaurus as basal stegosaurids, further suggesting that they are closely related.

In Hennig's 1915 description, Kentrosaurus was assigned to the family Stegosauridae due to the preservation of dermal armor and features like posterodorsally angled neural spines on the caudal vertebrae. This is confirmed by modern cladistic analyses, although in 1915 Stegosauridae was a far more inclusive concept that included some taxa now classified as ankylosaurs. A consecutive narrowing down of this concept caused Kentrosaurus, until the 1980s to be seen as a typical "primitive" stegosaurian, to be placed in a more derived, higher, position in the stegosaur evolutionary tree. However, recent analyses have consistently found Kentrosaurus to be in Stegosauridae, though typically as one of the most basal genera in the family. Kentrosaurus has many traits not seen in other stegosaurids but seen in basal stegosaurians, such as the presence of a parascapular spine and maxillary teeth with only seven denticles at the margin.

The type and sole accepted species of Kentrosaurus is Kentrosaurus aethiopicus, named by Hennig in 1915. Fragmentary fossil material from Wyoming, named Stegosaurus longispinus by Charles Gilmore in 1914, was in 1993 classified as a North American species of Kentrosaurus, as K. longispinus. However, this action was not accepted by the paleontological community, and S. longispinus has been assigned to its own genus, Alcovasaurus, differing from Kentrosaurus in having more elongated tail spikes and the structure of the pelvis and vertebrae. Cladogram of the phylogenetic analysis of Stegosauridae conducted by Maidment et al. (2019), which recovers a distinct Alcovasaurus:

- Stegosauridae
  - - Alcovasaurus
    - Paranthodon
    - Tuojiangosaurus
  - - Kentrosaurus
    - - - Adratiklit
        - - Dacentrurus
          - Miragaia
      - - Jiangjunosaurus
        - Hesperosaurus
        - - Loricatosaurus
          - Stegosaurus

In 2025, phylogenetic analysis conducted by Sánchez-Fenollosa & Cobos recovered Kentrosaurus as a member of Dacentrurinae. These results are displayed in the cladogram below:

- Stegosauria
  - Huayangosauridae
    ⊞
    - Isaberrysaura
    - - - Bashanosaurus
        - Huayangosaurus
      - - Baiyinosaurus
        - Gigantspinosaurus
    ⊟
  - Stegosauridae
    - Chungkingosaurus
    - - - Tuojiangosaurus
        - Paranthodon
      - Neostegosauria
        - Dacentrurinae
          - Alcovasaurus
          - - Kentrosaurus
            - - Thyreosaurus
              - - Adratiklit
                - Dacentrurus
                  (including Miragaia)
        - Stegosaurinae
          - - - Qigu Formation stegosaur
              - Loricatosaurus
            - - Hesperosaurus
              - Stegosaurus stenops
          - - Jiangjunosaurus
            - - Hekou Group stegosaur
              - - Wuerhosaurus homheni
                - Yanbeilong

== Paleobiology ==
=== Feeding ===
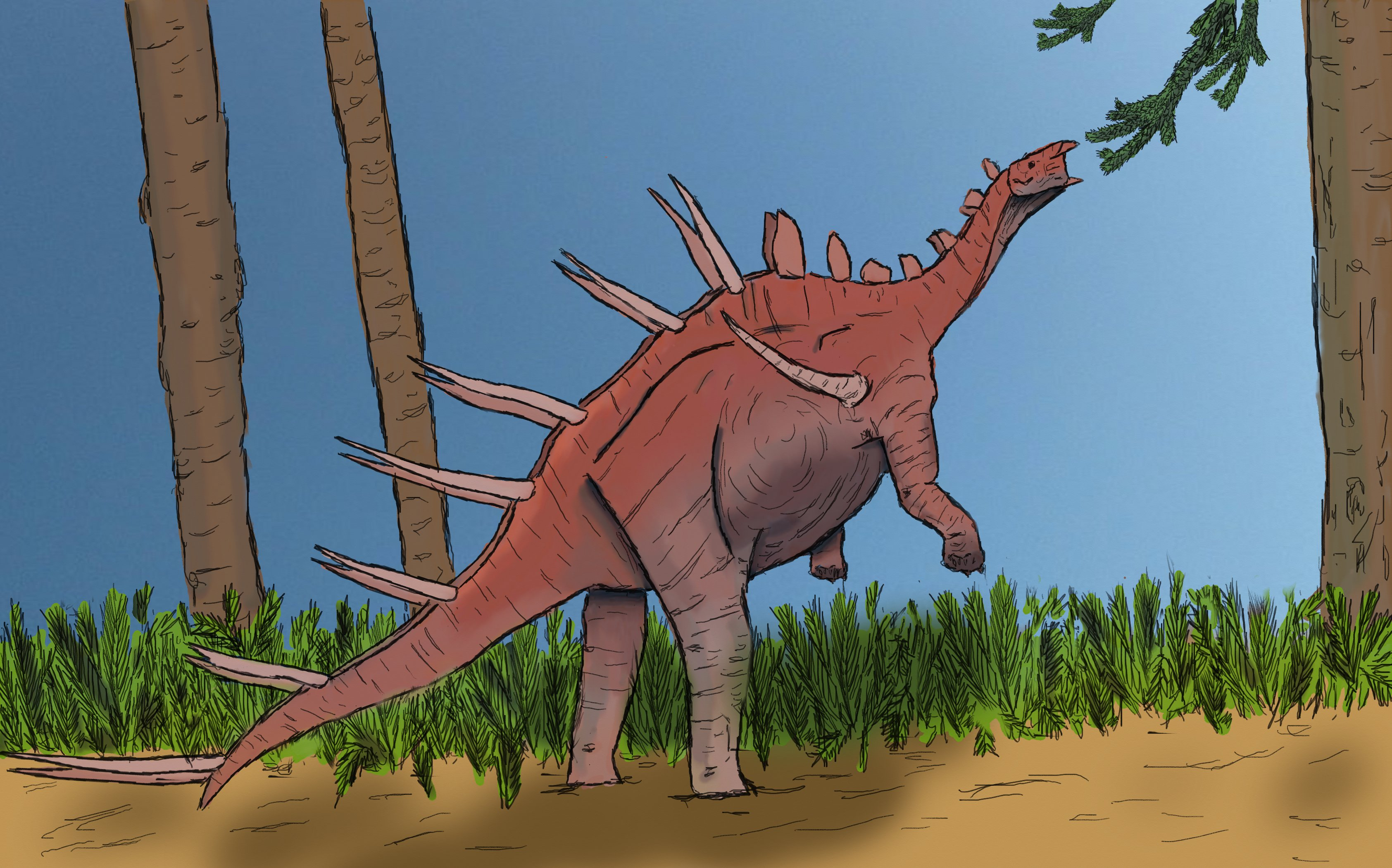
Depiction of Kentrosaurus reaching for leaves on a tree

Like all ornithischians, Kentrosaurus was a herbivore. The fodder was barely chewed and swallowed in large chunks. One hypothesis on stegosaurid diet holds that they were low-level browsers, eating foliage and low-growing fruit from various non-flowering plants. Kentrosaurus was capable of eating at heights of up to 1.7 m (5 ft 7 in) when on all fours. It may also have been possible for it to rear up on its hindlegs to reach vegetation higher in trees.

With its centre of mass close to the hind-limbs, the animal could potentially support itself as it stood up. The hips were likely capable of allowing a vertical trunk rotation of about 60 degrees and the tail probably would either have been fully lifted, not blocking this movement or have enough curvature to rest on the ground; thus it could have provided additional support, though precisely because of this flexibility it is not certain whether much support was actually provided: it was not stiff enough to function as a "third leg" as had been suggested by Robert Thomas Bakker. In this pose, Kentrosaurus could have fed at heights of 3.3 m (11 ft).

=== Sexual dimorphism ===
Differences in the proportions, not the size, of the femurs (thighbones) led Holly Barden and Susannah Maidment to realize that Kentrosaurus probably showed sexual dimorphism. This dimorphism of the femurs consisted in them being either more or less robust than the other. The occurrence ratio of the robust morph to the gracile one was 2:1, and it is likely that the higher percentage of animals were females. Because of this ratio, it was considered reasonable to assume that in their society, Kentrosaurus males mated with more than one female, a behaviour also found in other vertebrates.

The problem posed by the ratio is that the multiple specimens studied, died in the same place, but probably not in a sudden mass-death and so do not represent a single herd or contemporary population. The results may have been distorted by a greater chance for robust animals of getting fossilised or discovered. In an earlier study by Galton in 1982, it was suggested that individual difference in the sacral rib count of both Kentrosaurus and Dacentrurus might be an indication of dimorphism: females would have had an extra pair of sacral ribs, having also the first sacral vertebra connected to the ilium, in addition to the subsequent four sacrals.

=== Reproduction and growth ===
As the plates and spikes would have been obstacles during copulation, it is possible that pairs mated back-to-back with the female staying still in a lordosis posture as the male maneuvers his penis into her cloaca. The shoulder spikes would have made the female unable to lie on her side during mating as is proposed for Stegosaurus.

In 2013, a study by Ragna Redelstorff e.a. concluded that the bone histology of Kentrosaurus indicated that it had a higher growth rate than reported for Stegosaurus and Scutellosaurus, in view of the relatively rapid deposition of highly vascularised fibrolamellar bone. As Stegosaurus was larger than Kentrosaurus, this contradicts the general rule that larger dinosaurs grew quicker than smaller ones.

=== Defense ===
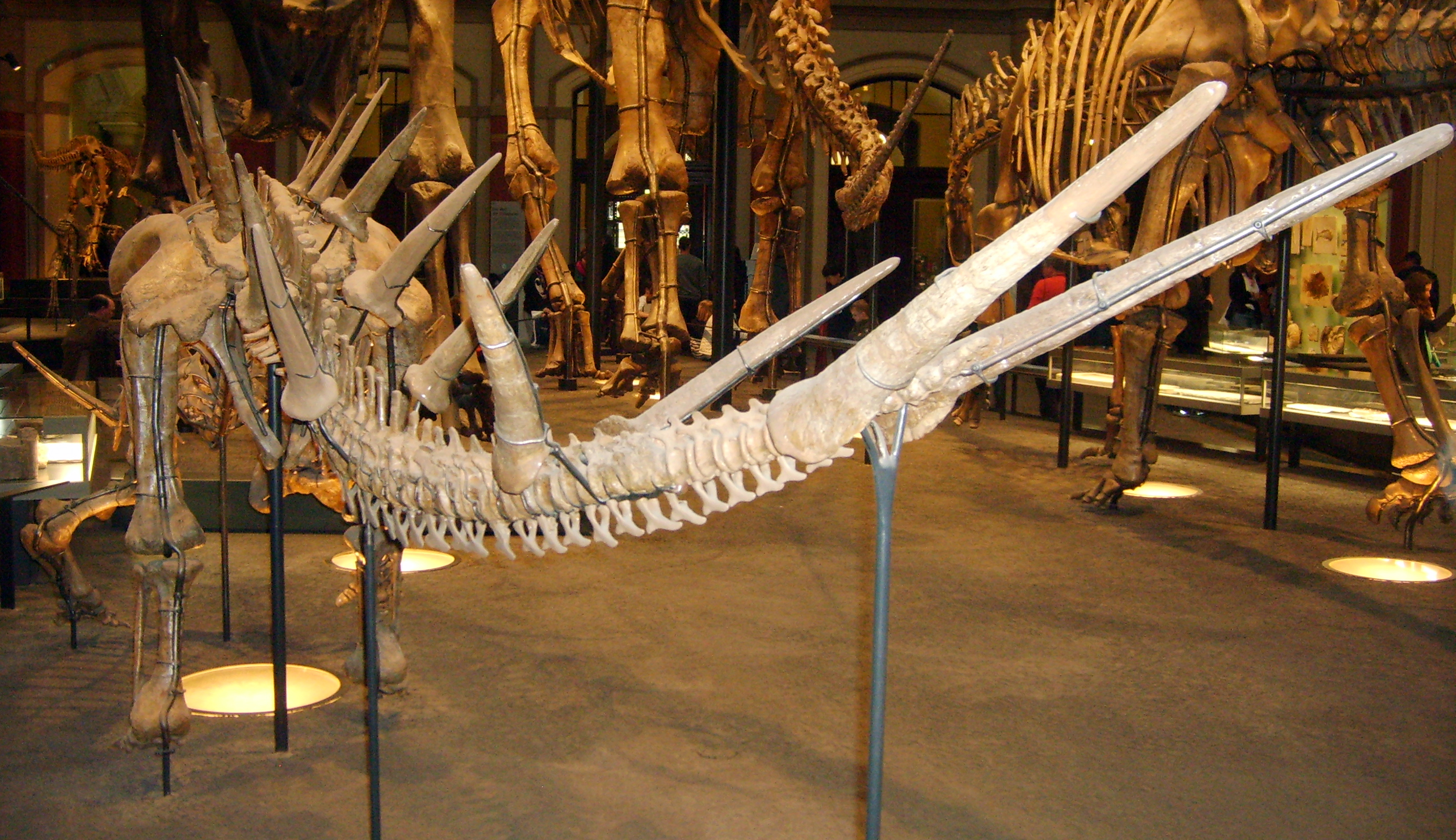
Thagomizer on the Museum für Naturkunde Berlin mount

Because the tail had at least forty caudal vertebrae, it was highly mobile. It could possibly swing at an arc of 180 degrees, covering the entire half circle behind it. Swing speeds at the tail end may have been as high as 50 km/h. Continuous rapid swings would have allowed the spikes to slash open the skin of its attacker or to stab the soft tissues and break the ribs or facial bones. More directed blows would have resulted in the sides of the spikes fracturing even sturdy longbones of the legs by blunt trauma. These attacks would have crippled small and medium-sized theropods and may even have done some damage to large ones. Earlier interpretations of the defensive behaviour of Kentrosaurus included the suggestion that the animal might have charged to the rear, to run through attackers with its spines, in the way of modern porcupines.

Though Kentrosaurus likely stood with forelimbs erect like in other dinosaurs, it is hypothesised that the animal adopted a sprawling posture when defending itself. Its neck was flexible enough to allow it to keep sight of predators, as it could reach the sides of its body with its snout and look over the back. In addition, the posterior position of the center of mass may not have been advantageous for rapid locomotion, but meant that the animal could quickly rotate around the hips by pushing sideways with the arms, keeping the tail pointed at the attacker. Kentrosaurus was nevertheless not invulnerable. A quick predator could have made it to the tail base (where the impact speed would be much lower) when the tail passed and the neck and upper-part of the body would have been unprotected by the tail swings. A successful predation of Kentrosaurus may have required group hunting. Compared to the more robust spikes of Stegosaurus, the thinner spikes of Kentrosaurus were at greater risk of bending.

== Paleoecology ==
Kentrosaurus lived in what is now Tanzania in the Late Jurassic Tendaguru Formation. The main Kentrosaurus quarries were located in the Middle Saurian Beds dating from the upper Kimmeridgian. Some remains were found in the Upper Saurian Beds dating from the Tithonian. Since 2012, the boundary between the Kimmeridgian and Tithonian is dated at 152.1 million year ago.

The Tendaguru ecosystem primarily consisted of three types of environment: shallow, lagoon-like marine environments, tidal flats and low coastal environments; and vegetated inland environments. The marine environment existed above the fair weather wave base and behind siliciclastic and ooid barriers. It appeared to have had little change in salinity levels and experienced tides and storms. The coastal environments consisted of brackish coastal lakes, ponds and pools. These environments had little vegetation and were probably visited by herbivorous dinosaurs mostly during droughts. The well vegetated inlands were dominated by conifers. Overall, the Late Jurassic Tendaguru climate was subtropical to tropical with seasonal rains and pronounced dry periods. During the Early Cretaceous, the Tendaguru became more humid. The Tendaguru Beds are similar to the Morrison Formation of North America except in its marine interbeds.

Kentrosaurus would have coexisted with fellow ornithischians like Dysalotosaurus lettowvorbecki; the sauropods Giraffatitan brancai, Dicraeosaurus hansemanni and D. sattleri, Janenschia africana, Tendaguria tanzaniensis and Tornieria africanus; theropods "Allosaurus" tendagurensis, "Ceratosaurus" roechlingi, "Torvosaurus" ingens, Elaphrosaurus bambergi, Veterupristisaurus milneri and Ostafrikasaurus crassiserratus; and the pterosaur Tendaguripterus recki. Other organisms that inhabited the Tendaguru included corals, echinoderms, cephalopods, bivalves, gastropods, decapods, sharks, neopterygian fish, crocodilians and small mammals like Brancatherulum tendagurensis.

== See also ==
- Timeline of stegosaur research
