= Gigantoscelus =

Gigantoscelus Temporal range: Early Jurassic, 199–189 Ma

Scientific classification
- Domain: Eukaryota
- Kingdom: Animalia
- Phylum: Chordata
- Clade: Dinosauria
- Clade: Saurischia
- Clade: †Sauropodomorpha
- Genus: †Gigantoscelus
- Species: †G. molengraaffi

Binomial name
- †Gigantoscelus molengraaffi van Hoepen, 1916

Extinct genus of dinosaurs

Gigantoscelus ("giant shin") is a dubious genus of basal sauropodomorph dinosaur from the Early Jurassic of South Africa.

== Classification ==
It was first described by van Hoepen in 1916 on the basis of TrM 65, a distal femur from the Bushveld Sandstone Formation of South Africa. It was later synonymized with Euskelosaurus by van Heerden (1979), but was subsequently treated as a nomen dubium in the 2nd edition of the Dinosauria.

== Stratigraphy ==
The type horizon of Gigantoscelus, the Bushveld Sandstone, was thought to be Late Triassic, but is now considered Early Jurassic (Hettangian-Sinemurian) in age.
