= 1883 in paleontology =

Paleontology or palaeontology is the study of prehistoric life forms on Earth through the examination of plant and animal fossils. This includes the study of body fossils, tracks (ichnites), burrows, cast-off parts, fossilised feces (coprolites), palynomorphs and chemical residues. Because humans have encountered fossils for millennia, paleontology has a long history both before and after becoming formalized as a science. This article records significant discoveries and events related to paleontology that occurred or were published in the year 1883.

== Plants ==
=== Gnetophytes ===
Name	Novelty	Status	Authors	Age	Unit	Location	Synonymized taxa	Notes	Images
Ephedra mengeana	Sp nov	jr synonym	Göppert in Göppert & Menge	Eocene; Lutetian-Priabonian	Baltic Amber	Europe; Baltic Sea Coast		Identified as a gnetophyte relative. Moved from Ephedra mengeana (1883); Moved to Arceuthobium mengeanum (2017).	Arceuthobium mengeanum

=== Angiosperms ===
Name	Novelty	Status	Authors	Age	Type locality	Location	Notes	Images
Porana speirii	Sp nov	jr synonym	Lesquereux	late Eocene	Florissant Formation	United States; Colorado	A mallow relative. moved to Holmskioldia speirii (1953)	Florissantia speirii

== Dinosaurs ==
Taxon	Novelty	Status	Author(s)	Age	Unit	Location	Notes	Images
Craspedodon	Gen. et sp. nov.	Nomen dubium	Dollo	Santonian	Glauconie de Lonzée Formation	Belgium	An early ceratopsian	Craspedodon lonzeensis
Megalosaurus bredai	Sp. nov.	Valid	Seeley	Maastrichtian	Maastricht Formation	Netherlands	First named as a megalosaurid Moved to Betasuchus bredai (1932)	Betasuchus bredai
Orthomerus	Gen. et sp. nov.	Nomen dubium	Seeley	Maastrichtian	Maastricht Formation	Netherlands	A hadrosaurid relative	Orthomerus dolloi

== Plesiosaurs ==
=== New taxa ===
Name	Status	Authors	Notes
Luetkesaurus	Nomen dubium	Kiprijanoff	
