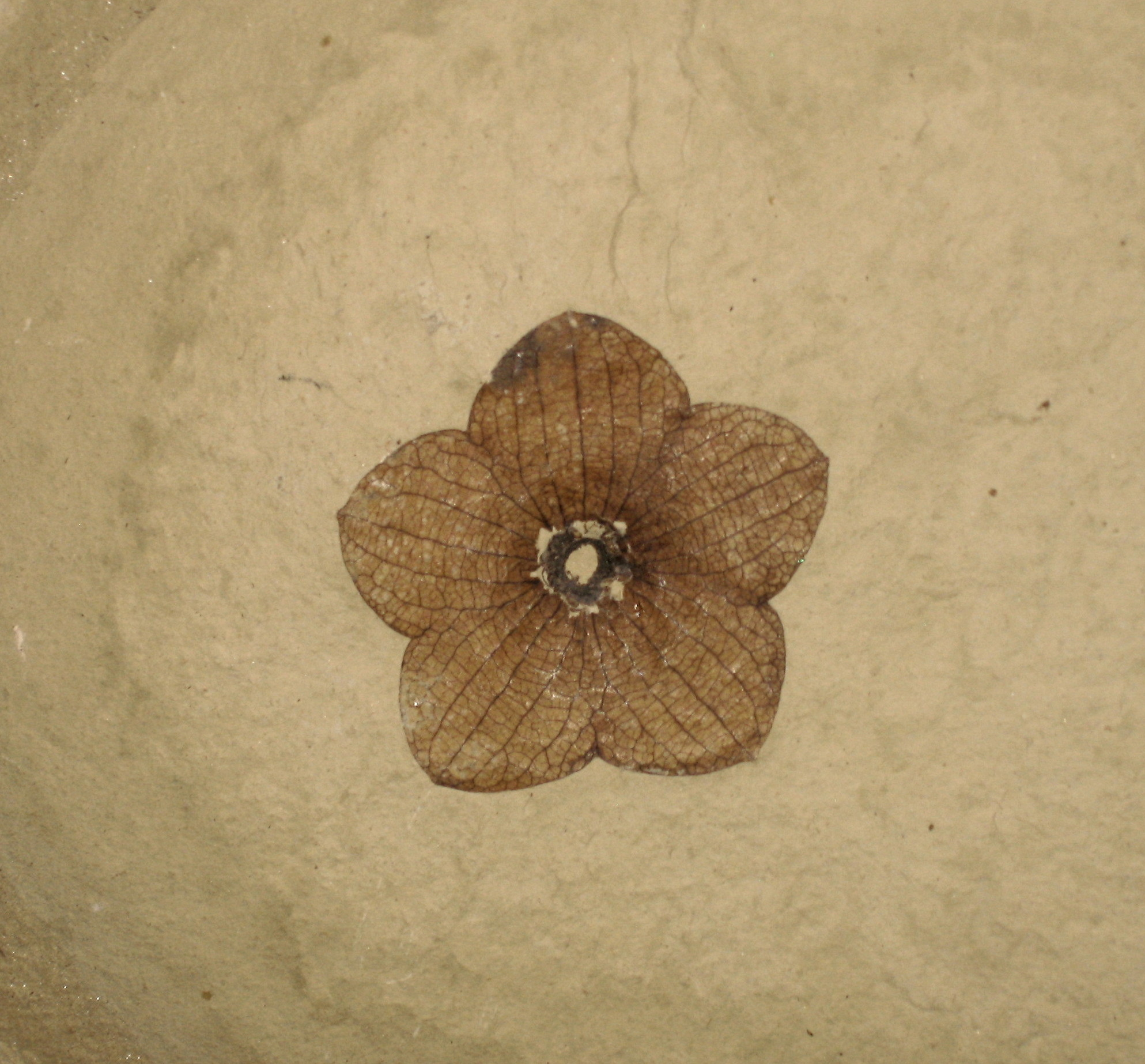
- Florissantia quilchenensis Klondike Mountain Formation

Scientific classification
- Kingdom: Plantae
- Clade: Tracheophytes
- Clade: Angiosperms
- Clade: Eudicots
- Clade: Rosids
- Order: Malvales
- Family: Malvaceae
- Subfamily: Sterculioideae
- Genus: †Florissantia (Knowlton) Manchester

Species
- F. ashwillii; F. quilchenensis; F. sikhote-alinensis; F. speirii

Synonyms
- F. ashwillii synonymy: Viburnum palmatum Chaney & Sanborn, 1933 (pro part); F. quilchenensis synonymy: Holmskioldia quilchenensis Mathewes & Brooke, 1971; F. sikhote-alinensis synonymy: Porana sikhote-alinensis Kryshtofovich, 1921; F. speirii synonymy: Florissantia physalis Knowlton, 1916; Porana similis Knowlton, 1916; Porana speirii Lesquereux, 1883; Holmskioldia speirii MacGinitie, 1953

= Florissantia (plant) =

Florissantia Temporal range: Eocene-Oligocene

Genus of plant in the mallow family (fossil)

Florissantia is an extinct genus of flowering plants in the Malvaceae subfamily Sterculioideae known from western North America and far eastern Asia. Flower, fruit, and pollen compression fossils have been found in formations ranging from the Early Eocene through to the Early Oligocene periods. The type species is Florissantia speirii and three additional species are known, Florissantia ashwillii, Florissantia quilchenensis, and Florissantia sikhote-alinensis.

== Distribution ==
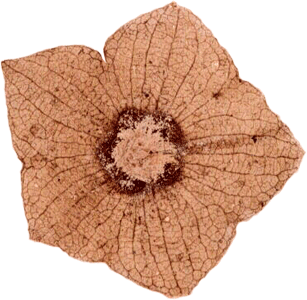
Florissantia speirii, Florissant Formation

Fossils of Florissantia have been found in Early Eocene to Middle Oligocene localities, including North American fossil beds in Alaska, British Columbia, Colorado, Montana, Oregon, Utah, Washington, Wyoming. Additionally, two occurrences have been reported from southern and eastern Asia in Rajasthan, India and coastal Russian far east.

The type species F. speirii is known from a number of formations in the west, with the type locality being the Florissant Formation of Colorado. The formation is composed of successive lake deposits resulting from a volcanic debris flow damming a valley. When the species was described, the Florissant Formation was considered to be Miocene in age, based on the flora and fauna preserved. Successive research and fossil descriptions moved the age older and by 1985 the formation had been reassigned to an Oligocene age. Further refinement of the formation's age using radiometric dating of sanidine crystals has resulted in an age of 34.07 million years ago placing the formation in the Priabonian stage of the Late Eocene. A tentative report of the species from the Katalla Formation, Alaska was made by Jack Wolfe (1977) based on a single specimen. The occurrence is supported by an additional fossil from the lowland floodplain environment preserved in the Huntingdon Formation around Vancouver, British Columbia.

F. quilchenensis has been recovered from four locations in the Okanagan highlands, the Falklands and McAbee sites near Cache Creek, British Columbia, the Coldwater Beds Quilchena site near Quilchena, British Columbia and the Klondike Mountain Formation in Republic, Washington, northern Ferry County, Washington. The Okanagan highlands are aged between 51.5 ± 0.4 million years ago for the Quilchena site to 51.2 to 49.4 million years ago for the Klondike Mountain Formations Tom Thumb Tuff member. The youngest F. quilchenensis occurrence is from the early Oligocene Gumboot Mountain Flora of southwestern Washington. Additionally Florissantia sp. fossils have also been reported from Okanagan highlands sites in the Allenby Formation near Princeton, the Horsefly Shales near Horsefly, and the Driftwood Shales near Smithers, British Columbia, without indication of species affinity.

F. ashwillii is confined to the Middle to Late Eocene Clarno Formation, Latest Eocene Goshen flora and Early Oligocene John Day Formation of central Oregon. The type locality was designated by Manchester (1992) as the Sheep Rock Creek locality, which represents an isolated pond deposit likely correlating to Clarno Formation based on a palm frond fossil found at the site. The species also is present in the western Oregon "Goshen Flora", which is part of the Fisher Formation The youngest occurrences of F. ashwillii are confined to the Summer Spring shales locality around Grey Butte and thought to correlate with Early Oligocene strata of the John Day Formation.

The Amgu flora, the type locality for F. sikhote-alinensis, represents outcrops of the Khutsin Formation exposed in the Sikhote Alin mountains on the Russian far-east coast. The flora was reported by Manchester (1999) as Miocene, however more detailed work on the stratigraphy of the region moved the age to Early Oligocene as noted by Kvaček et al. (2005), Peng et al. (2011) reported a slightly older late Eocene or Early Oligocene age which was followed by Archibald and Rasnitsyn (2018) who list the site as likely Priabonian or perhaps Rupelian.

The flower reported in 2024 from the Northwestern Indian province of Rajasthan was recovered from the Gurha opencast lignite mine working rocks of the Palana Formation. Based on palynological data the formation has an estimated Early Eocene age, with dating between 55 to 52 million years ago. The Formation has been interpreted to preserve a region of ponds, flood plains, swamps, and waterways moderated by a warm wet climate.

== History and classification ==
Fossils now placed in Florissantia were first reported by Leo Lesquereux (1883) from the Florissant Formation and described as the morning glory family species Porana speirii. Additional fossils were described by Knowlton (1916) as another species, Porana similis as well as a third species, which he placed into the new genus Florissantia as Florissantia physalis.

Calyxes of F. quilchenensis were first reported by Berry (1929), who identified them as the Miocene Hydrangea species Hydrangea bendirei. The Republic fossils were later included by Brown (1935) in Porana speiri. Mathewes and Brooke (1971) described a solitary flower as the new species Holmskioldia quilchenensis from a fossil found at the Quilchena site in British Columbia, which Manchester (1992) redescribed based on a larger selection of specimens from Republic, and moved the species into Florissantia.

The first instance of F. ashwillii was published by Chaney and Sanborn (1933) who included the flowers as in their species Viburnum palmatum. Manchester (1992) described the Florissantia species based on a series of 45 fossils found in north central Oregon and noted that the 1933 flower was not related to the leaf holotype fossil of V. palmatum. The F. ashwillii holotype specimen, UF 11740, was a part of the University of Florida collections at the time of description, with additional fossils examined from the University of California Museum of Paleontology collections. Manchester chose the specific epithet ashwillii as a patronym honoring Melvin S. Ashwill who collected many of the specimens examined.

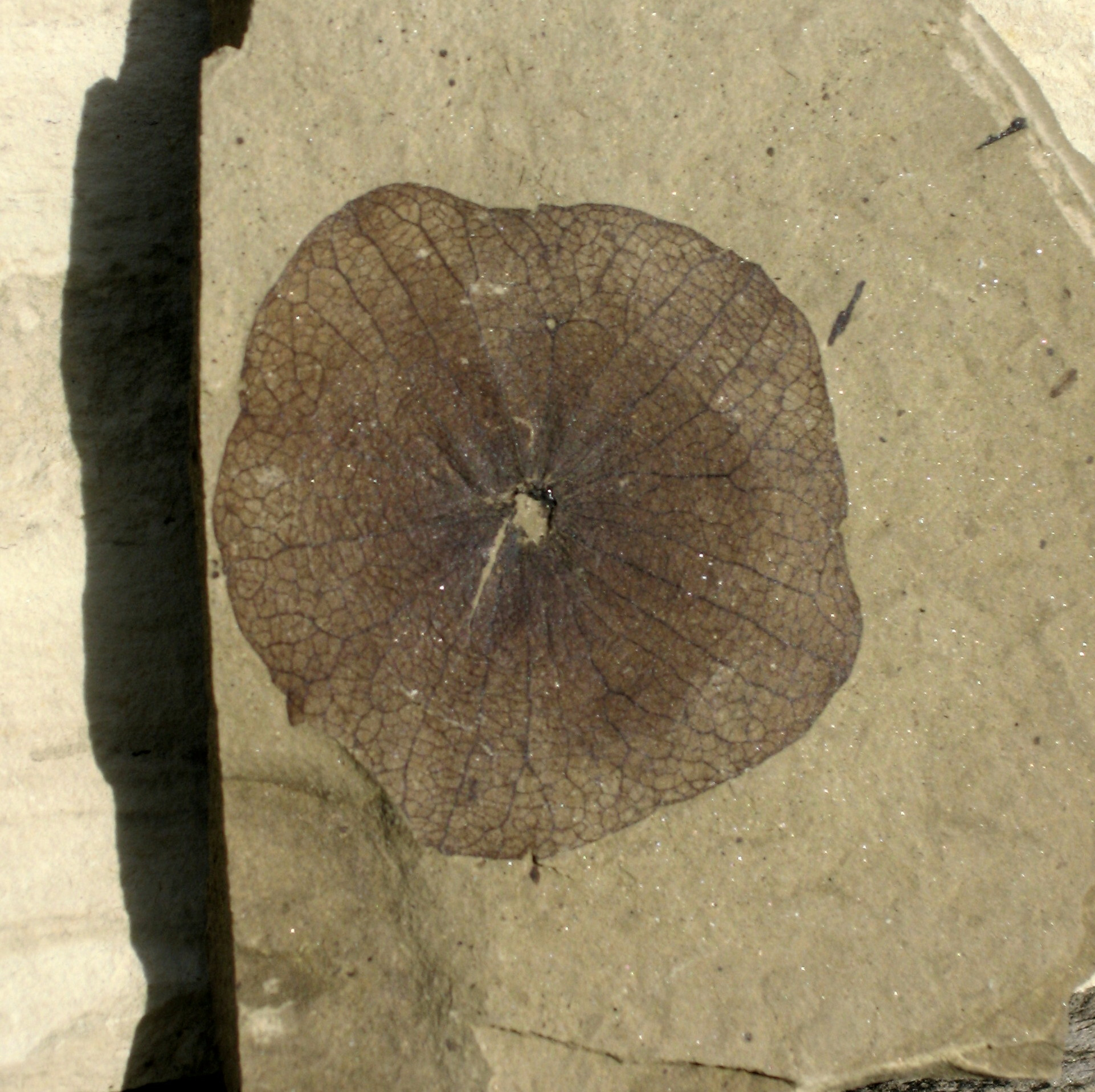
F. quilchenensis with fully fused sepals, Klondike Mountain Formation

== Description ==
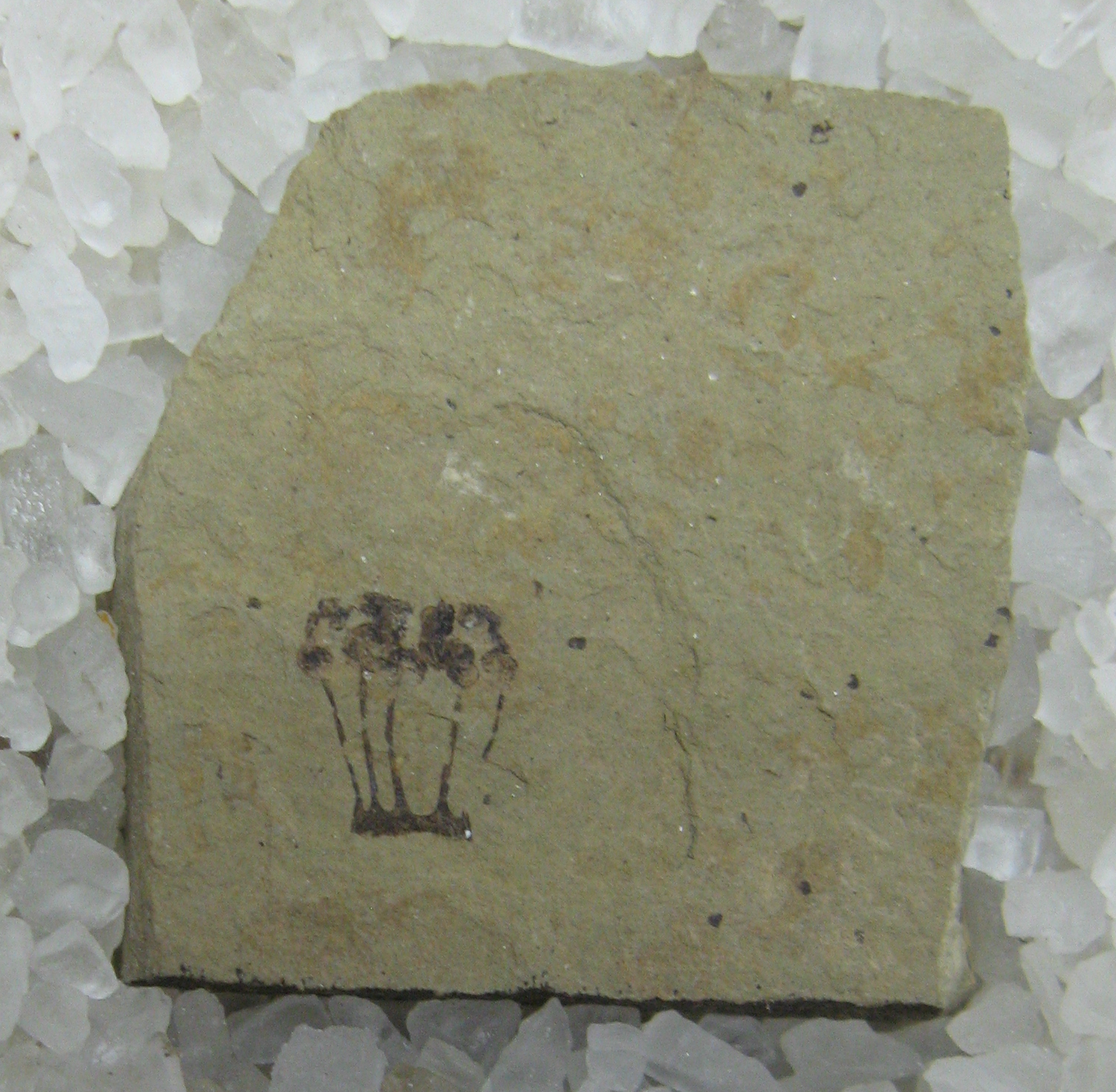
F. quilchenensis stamen group, Klondike Mountain Formation

All Florissantia species share a distinct set of physical traits in common. The flowers are radially symmetrical shallowly bell shaped, with large sepals fused up to 50% of their length and born on long pedicels. The sepals display a distinct reticulate venation radiating from the center of each sepal with the crossveins forming rectangular to polygonal meshes of smaller veins. Between five and seven major veins run from the sepal base apically before loping towards the apex and fusing together. Additional large veins run to the point of each sinus, and supporting several secondary veins. The basal calyx is thicker than the sepal tissue and often hairy with the small thick petals forming a corolla around the calyx base. The flowers have an expanded androgynophore from which the ovary arises. A single style extends from the center of the ovary though the surrounding androecium to above the corolla of five stamens. The stamen filaments fork once near the tip, and host ten total anthers with elongated to globose outlines. The 20–32 μm (0.00079–0.00126 in) pollen grains are slightly flattened spheres, with three to four short colpi apertures on the outer surface

=== Florissantia ashwillii ===
Florissantia ashwillii calyxes are moderate in size with a diameter of 21–31 mm (0.83–1.22 in), those of F. quichenensis are known to be smaller, while those of F. speirii range notably larger. F. ashwilli is noted for having deeply indented lobe sinuses which extend between 35% and 60% towards the center of the corolla from the margins. The pedicels are at least 13 mm (0.51 in) long, with a hairy basal area of the corolla, and pollen smaller than that of F. speirii.

=== Florissantia quilchenensis ===
F. quilchenensis is calyxes range between 19 and 33 mm (0.75 and 1.30 in), with some of the smallest recorded specimens in Florissantia. unlike the other three species, the calyx lobes range from approximately 33% indentation to being fully absent, resulting in a circular calyx. At the time of description, only three specimens had been recovered in which the stamens were present and approximately ten anthers or half anthers are preserved on the most complete of the specimens. The pedicels are longer than those in F. ashwillii, being between 16 and 21 mm (0.63 and 0.83 in) long and between 0.5 and 0.7 mm (0.020 and 0.028 in) thick. The petals are around 3.0 mm × 3.5 mm (0.12 in × 0.14 in) and are arranged in alternation with the Calyx lobes, when the lobes are present. The style is 8 mm (0.31 in) long and extends above the stamens. Rather than having globose anthers, such as seen in F. speirii, the 2–3 mm (0.079–0.118 in) long anthers are elongated like those seen in F. ashwillii.

=== Florissantia sikhote-alinensis ===
Florissantia sikhote-alinensis was first described as Porana by Kryshtofov (1921). The fossil pictured in plate 2 fig. 7 of the paper was subsequently lost and was unavailable for reexamination by Manchester in 1998.

=== Florissantia speirii ===
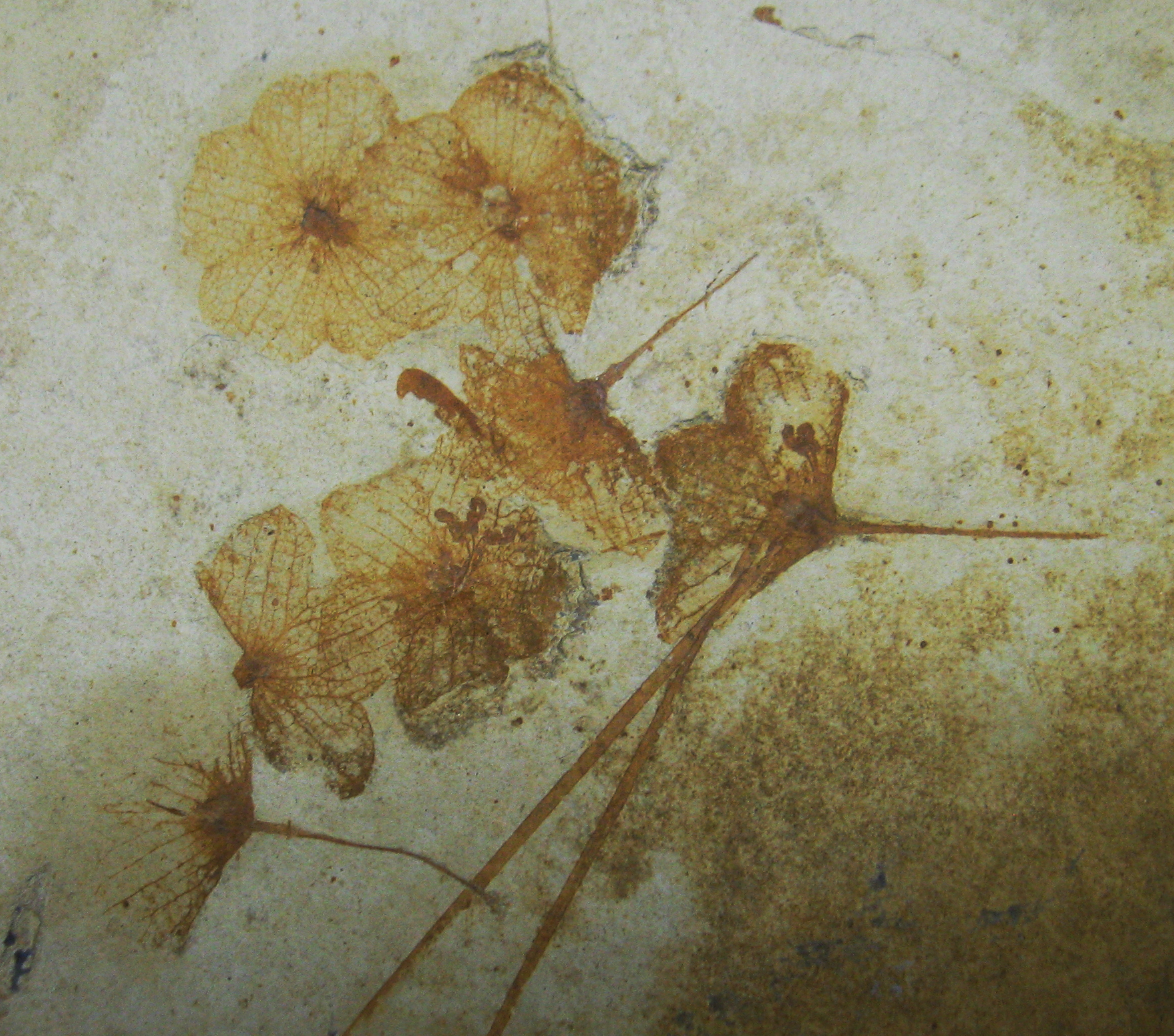
Florissantia quilchenensis with long pedicel showing

F. speirii calyxes range between 23 and 54 mm (0.91 and 2.13 in) having some of the largest calyxes in Florissantia. The calyxes show poorly developed to well developed lobes that indent between 20% and 35% from the outer margins and in flowers with poorly developed indentation, the calyx outline is pentagonal instead of rounded. The androgynophore has a rounded pentagonal to circular cross-section and an approximately 11 mm (0.4 in) long style.

A tepal corolla has been found attached to a single fossil from the Florissant Fossil Beds National Monument collections.

=== Florissantia sp. ===
The Palama fossil is smaller, at 13 mm (0.51 in) across, then the reported sizes of the described species. The lobes are large and distinct, ranging between 8.5–10.2 mm (0.33–0.40 in) in length with rounded to pointed lobe tips. The sinuses between the lobes extend at most 25% of the flower depth. As is typical for most Florissantia species, the petals dropped from the calyx before it was fossilized. Due to the smaller size and mix of characters, Ashif Ali and his coauthors did not assign the flower to an existing species.

== Paleoecology ==
The structure of Florissantia flowers suggests the genus was pollinated by insects or birds. With the long slender pedicels, the flowers likely hung downwards from the plant in an pendant like manner, with dense hairs along the flower bases acting as nectaries. These are features seen in a number of modern Malvaceae genera. Additionally the stamens and styles are thicker and robust, features often associated with bird and bat pollinators, indicating Florissantia may have been a transitional genus between insect pollination and bat or bird pollination. It is possible that the calyces did not grow to full size until after pollination, with the young flowers being smaller and less showy. It is likely the fruits matured into a samara with the calyx acting as a wing around the fruit.
