= Bushveld Sandstone =

Geological formation of the Stormberg Group in Transvaal, South Africa

- Stratigraphic range: Hettangian-Sinemurian; ~201–189 Ma
- Type: Geological formation
- Unit of: Stormberg Group

Lithology
- Primary: Sandstone

Location
- Coordinates: 22.8°S 29.3°E
- Approximate paleocoordinates: 37.9°S 4.7°E
- Region: Mpumalanga, Limpopo
- Country: South Africa
- Bushveld Sandstone (South Africa)

The Bushveld Sandstone is a geological formation dating to roughly between 201 and 189 million years ago and covering the Carnian to Norian stages. The Bushveld Sandstone is found in Transvaal, South Africa, and is a member of the Stormberg Group. As its name suggests, it consists mainly of sandstone. Fossils of the prosauropod dinosaur Massospondylus have been recovered from the Bushveld Sandstone.

The Bushveld Sandstone was thought to be Late Triassic age, but was considered to be temporally correlative to the Clarens Formation by Smith et al. (1993).

== Vertebrate fauna ==
Dinosaur tracks are located in Transvaal.

Dinosaurs
Genus	Species	Presence	Notes	Images
Gigantoscelus	G. molengraaffi	Geographically located in Transvaal.	Remains now considered to be of indeterminate prosauropod origin. "Distal femur."	
Gryponyx	G. transvaalensis	Geographically located in Transvaal.	Remains now considered to be of indeterminate prosauropod origin. "Ungual, distal metatarsal."	
Massospondylus	M. carinatus	Geographically located in Transvaal. Geochronologically located in Early Jurassic strata.		

Color key: Taxon / Reclassified taxon / Taxon falsely reported as present / Dubious taxon or junior synonym / Ichnotaxon / Ootaxon / Morphotaxon	Notes; Uncertain or tentative taxa are in small text; ~~crossed out~~ taxa are discredited.

== See also ==
- List of dinosaur-bearing rock formations
- List of fossiliferous stratigraphic units in South Africa
- Clarens Formation
