= The Beautiful Game (compilation album) =

Compilation album / studio album by various artists
- Released: 20 May 1996
- Recorded: 1990–1996
- Genre: Alternative rock; Britpop; indie rock; alternative dance
- Length: 78:42
- Label: RCA; BMG
- Producer: Various; Rick Blaskey (executive producer)

Singles from The Beautiful Game
- 1. "Three Lions" Released: 20 May 1996; 2. "England's Irie" Released: 17 June 1996

The Beautiful Game, subtitled The Official Album of Euro '96, is an album of music by various artists released in 1996 by RCA and BMG Records as the official companion album to the UEFA Euro 1996 football tournament in England.

The album is a mix between a compilation album of previously released material and a studio album of new material, featuring twenty-two different artists, providing English football or football-related songs. It reflected the then-current popularity of Britpop and Cool Britannia.

The album was co-ordinated by the London-based English Football Association, a Music & Media Partnership host body. Music & Media's managing director Rick Blaskey, executive producer of music for Euro '96, stated "its clear that two cultures of music and football have never been so close. Consequently, as this country has such a rich heritage in both, it seemed right, it seemed only right to use music to celebrate England hosting Euro '96".

The album was released on 20 May 1996 in the UK by RCA and BMG and on 27 May in other European countries. RCA also revealed plans to release the album in Japan, declaring that it would "sell there purely on its content". It was a commercial success, peaking at number 10 in the UK Compilation Chart. Of the singles released from the album, the most successful was by far Frank Skinner, David Baddiel and The Lightning Seeds' "Three Lions", the Official Song for the England Football Team for the tournament, which spent three weeks at number 1 in the UK Singles Chart and was certified Platinum by the British Phonographic Industry. Music writer John Harris recognizes that the album arrived at the peak of "beer'n'footy culture" that was "bolted on to Britpop", saying that the album captures how the build-up to UEFA Euro 1996 "caught the imagination of the UK's musicians."

== Background ==
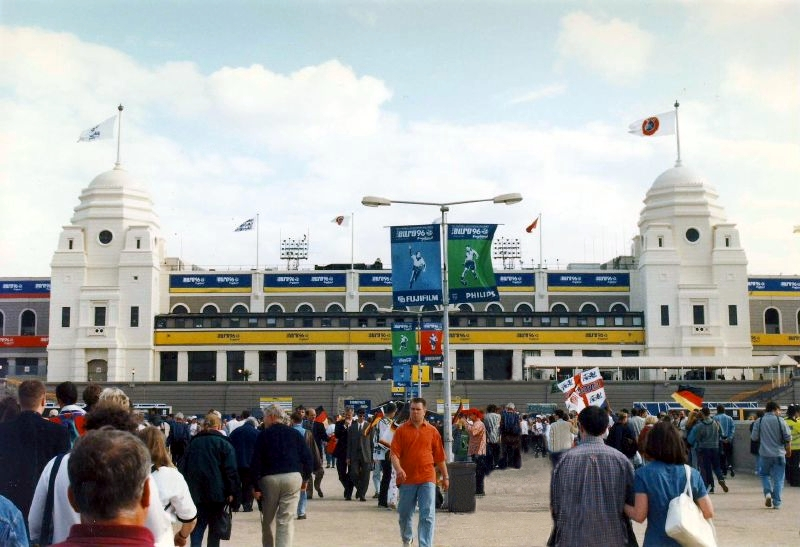
Wembley Stadium hosting the UEFA Euro 1996 games.

In the early 1990s, a subgenre of alternative rock known as Britpop emerged in the United Kingdom. Its bands were characterised by their influences of British guitar pop music of the 1960s and 1970s and indie rock from the 1980s. Britpop focused on bands, singing in regional British accents and making references to British places and British culture, particularly working-class culture. The movement developed as a reaction against various musical and cultural trends in the late 1980s and early 1990s, particularly the grunge phenomenon from the United States. Britpop groups brought British alternative pop-rock into the mainstream and formed the backbone of a larger British cultural era tagged Cool Britannia, a period of increased pride in the culture of the United Kingdom through much of the 1990s inspired by 1960s pop culture.

Meanwhile, England had been selected as the host nation to host the UEFA Euro 1996 football championships. The hosting of the event was contested by five bids: Austria, England, Greece, the Netherlands and Portugal. The English bid was selected by the UEFA Executive Committee at a meeting in Lisbon on 5 May 1992. In the year preceding the decision, the English FA had dropped out of their plans to also bid for the 1998 World Cup in order to gain the support of other UEFA members who were to bid for that event. By the time of the event in 1996, in the British music scene, Britpop had not only become most popular but music and football had "never been so close", and football-themed music had become increasingly popular in Britain during the 1990 FIFA World Cup. The UEFA Euro 1996 tournament itself arrived during the peak of Cool Britannia, and was seen as football "returning home" (as football was first played in England). During the tournament itself, support for England's football team was "unmissable".

In the promotion and marketing for the tournament, the English Football Association contacted London-based Music & Media Partnership to co-ordinate an "official album" of the tournament, which would both support the tournament and reflect current British music. The album was co-ordinated by Music & Media Partnership for the host body, the English Football Association. Music & Media performed the same role for the organisers of the 1994 FIFA World Cup. Music & Media managing director and UEFA Euro 1996 executive musical producer Rick Blaskey, said "It's clear that two cultures of music and football have never been so close. Consequently, as this country has such a rich heritage in both, it seemed right, it seemed only right to use music to celebrate England hosting Euro '96". It was settled in a deal with RCA Records and BMG that they would release the album. Official tournament sponsor Coca-Cola would also sponsor the album. It would be the first official album for a UEFA tournament in history.

== Content ==
The official CD version of The Beautiful Game features twenty-two different tracks, focusing mostly on the current Britpop subgenre of alternative rock and indie rock, although the album also contains songs from the related alternative dance genre. Tim Southwell of Loaded termed it a Britpop album. Many of the songs were recorded exclusively for the album, or were remixes created especially for the album, but the album contains some older, previously released material too, cross-licensed from other record labels. As such, it can be seen as a cross between a studio album and a compilation album. The older songs on the album were not composed as football songs, but they came to be adapted as such. The selection of bands on the album was described by The Baggage as "decidedly eclectic". It was rumoured at the time that Blur and Oasis, the two biggest Britpop bands and at the time rivals, would collaborate for the official England national team song for the event, but neither band recorded any music for the project, although Blur licensed their song "Parklife" for the compilation.

=== New material ===
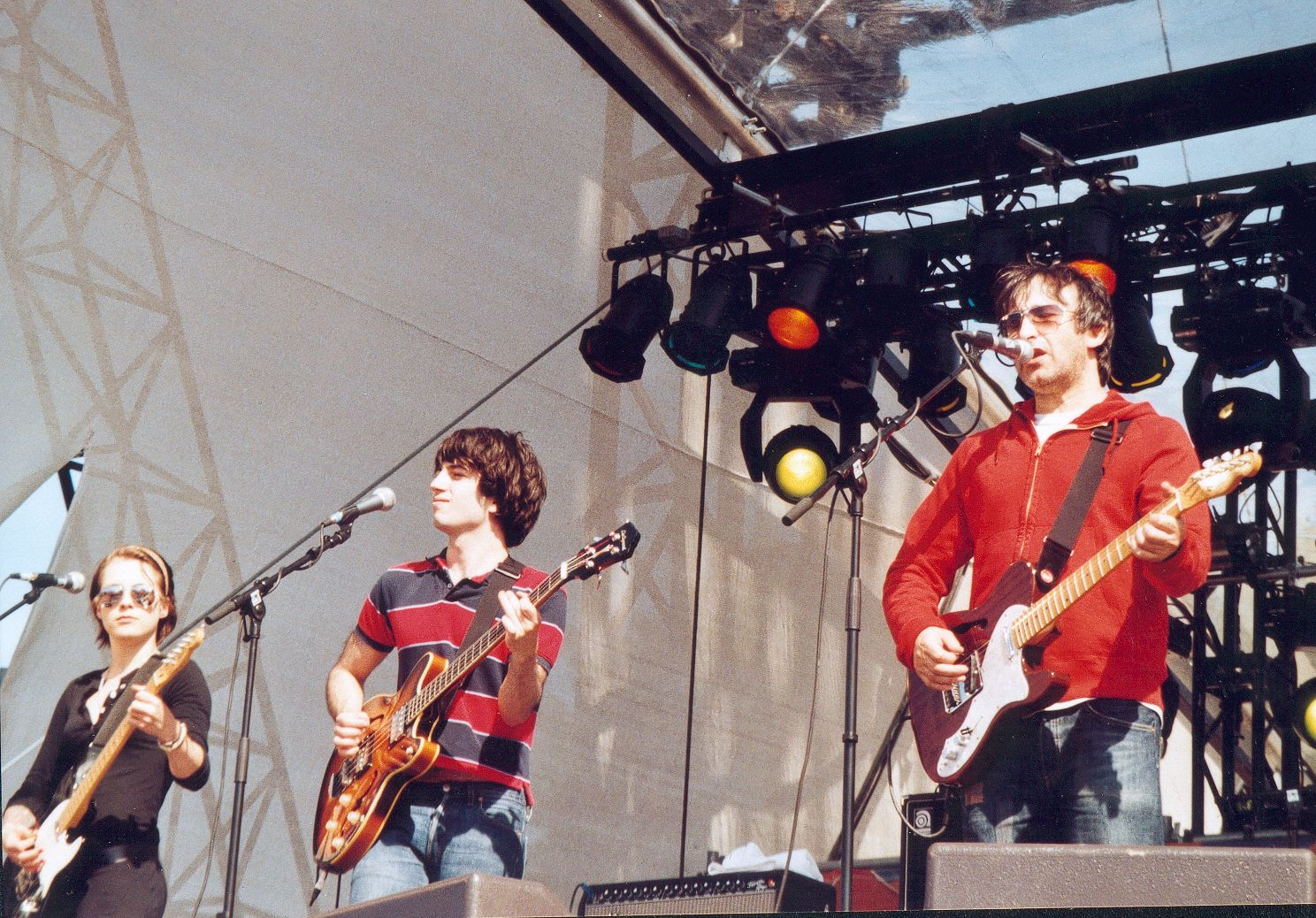
The Lightning Seeds, who performed the album's lead single "Three Lions".

Britpop band The Lightning Seeds were commissioned to write the "Official Song of the England national team". Ian Broudie of the band wrote the music of "Three Lions", with comedians David Baddiel and Frank Skinner - presenters of football-themed comedy show Fantasy Football League at the time - providing the lyrics. Unlike most football songs, its lyrics speak not of unbounded optimism for victory, but instead told of how, ever since the one unequivocal success of the English football team at the 1966 FIFA World Cup, every tournament has ended in dashed hopes for England. However, the repeated failures have not dampened the feeling that England could again reach those heights ("Three Lions on a shirt, Jules Rimet still gleaming. Thirty years of hurt, never stopped me dreaming").

"Three Lions", in its completed form, is presented as the 22nd and final song on the album, listed with the subtitle "Final Version". However, the album also contains two different "versions" of the song, "Version One" and "Version Two" (sequenced as the first and twelfth tracks respectively), which are seemingly recordings (in reality comedy skits) of Baddiel, Skinner and Broudie trying to formulate what the song's lyrics should be when in the process of originally writing it. "Version One" features lyrics such as "Three Lions on a shirt / Just near where it says Umbro / The white one shows the dirt / The grey one not as much though," whilst "Version Two" sees them discuss writing the song in parody of Bruce Forsyth after Baddiel suggests writing about the Beautiful Game, to which Skinner suggests is Play Your Cards Right, with lyrics including Forsyth's catchphrases from the show "Nothing for a pair / Dollies do your dealing."

Acid jazz-funk band Jamiroquai recorded "Use the Force" for the album, which would later appear on their album Travelling Without Moving (1996). Alternative dance band Black Grape recorded "England's Irie", a collaboration with former Clash member Joe Strummer and comedian Keith Allen. The song was described as combining squelchy acid-house synths, Britpop riffs and baggy beats with comically nonsensical lyrics ("my wife’s lactating and I’m spectating"), vocodered chants and sampled commentary. Bristolian trip hop act Massive Attack recorded "Eurochild Ninety 6", based upon the song "Eurochild" from their album Protection (1994). It features slow and heavy beats, a "late-night urban sleaze with a hint of menace" vibe, and was described as "the sound is that of Bristol’s esteemed purveyors of smoky dope beats." Original demos for the track included swirling chants and crowd noises, recorded by group member Robert Del Naja on a trip to Naples' San Paolo stadium, but they were dropped from the final version because they made it sound "too busy". The track itself was re-released as a B-side to their single "Teardrop" (1998) with the new name "Euro Zero Zero".

Several older songs were given new remixes; LFO's Mark Bell created the "96" remix of New Order's official England national team song from the FIFA World Cup 1990, "World in Motion", whilst The Shamen created the "On Grass Mix" of their song "Indica". Northern Uproar recorded "I Am the Cosmos" which was re-released as the B-side to their single "Town", released 11 days later on 1 June 1996. Nick Raphael, working under the pseudonym Spectre, remixed his song "Covert Dub" as "Offside Dub". Ant Chapman of Collapsed Lung remixed their football-themed song "Eat My Goal" for the compilation, renaming it "Beat My Goal (Black Cats Mix)". "Eat My Goal" itself had recently been remixed as the "Euro '96 Mix" which was featured in the then-current Coca-Cola UEFA Euro 1996 advertisement, and the "Black Cats Mix" is partially based on that version. Chapman would later state that the name "Black Cats" was a reference to his football team Sunderland AFC. Although Chapman considered the remix "awful", it was used for many years in the "Eat My Goal" segment on Ant & Dec's ITV children's breakfast show SMTV Live.

Although the majority of the artists are English, several Scottish indie rock artists also appear on the album. Teenage Fanclub wrote and recorded "Kickabout", based around the simple refrain of "hey everybody". The song later appeared as the B-side to their 1997 single "Ain't That Enough". An unlicensed cover version of the song was used in an Aldi advertisement in 2015 without having granted permission from the band. Primal Scream feature with an instrumental version of "The Big Man and The Scream Team Meet the Barmy Army Uptown". The vocal version of the song, which features Irvine Welsh and On-U Sound, did not feature on the album due to its profane, critical lyrics; the band released it as a single two weeks later on 3 June.

==== Production ====
Unlike some various artist releases of new material, but similar to others, the new tracks on The Beautiful Game were recorded in separate studios with separate producers. "England's Irie" was recorded at Real World Studios in Box, Wiltshire, whilst being remixed at BS Studios, Los Angeles. American producer Danny Saber produced the track and mixed it with John X.

=== Older material ===
The album features older, previously released material unrelated to football by other contemporary alternative bands, including Stereo MC's with their 1993 hit single "Step It Up", The Beautiful South's "Hooligans Don't Fall in Love" from their album Miaow (1994), Olive's recent album track "This Time" and numerous contemporary Britpop hit singles; The Wannadies' "Might Be Stars" (1995), Supergrass' hit single "Alright" (1995), Blur's hit single "Parklife" (1994), The Boo Radleys' "Skywalker" (1996), Pulp's hit single "Disco 2000" (1995) and The Gyres' "Break" (1996). Although not a football song and only released in as late as 1994, "Parklife" had been adopted as a football chant by football fans by 1996, and as such has featured on other football-related compilation albums, and even featured in Nike's critically acclaimed football-based 1997 television advertisement Parklife, ranked the 14th best advert of all time by ITV in 2005, and as the 15th best by Channel 4 in 2000. The Baggage opined that the familiar Britpop hits appear alongside the dance music on the album because "the cool dance stuff isn't exactly your typical football sing-a-long fair."

== Release ==
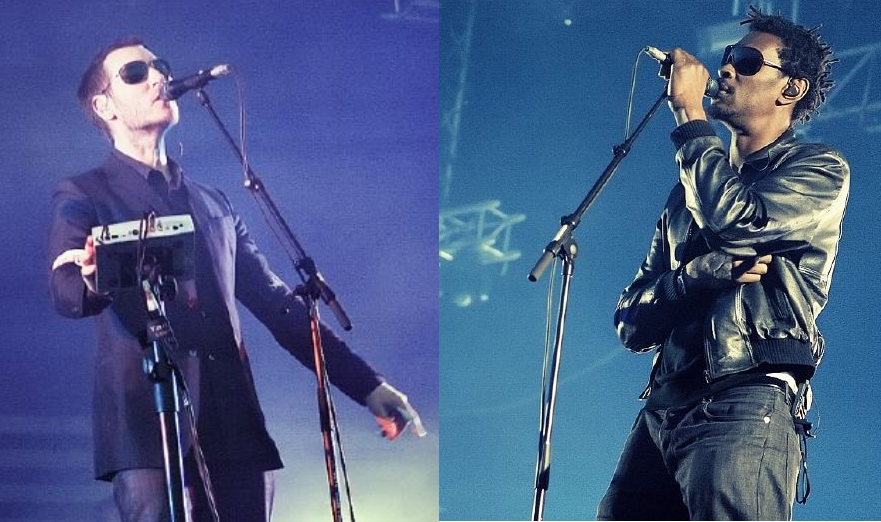
Massive Attack (pictured in 2008) played a friendly match with members of Blur and Supergrass at Wembley Stadium to promote the album.

In the UK, The Beautiful Game was released on 20 May 1996 by RCA and BMG. On 27 May, the album was released by RCA in the other competing countries of the UEFA cup; Germany, France, Italy, Spain, the Netherlands, Sweden and Portugal. RCA also revealed plans to release the album in Japan, declaring that it would "sell there purely on its content". The album was sponsored by Coca-Cola, who also sponsored the tournament itself, and the name of the album was taken from Coca-Cola's tie-in campaign for the tournament, featuring the slogan "The beautiful game." In the UK, it was issued in three different formats; CD, cassette and a limited edition picture disc LP featuring only twelve tracks. One side of the LP, also the face of the actual CD disc, features a vintage football with the names of the artists on the albums handwritten on it. The back cover featured the track listing split into two sections, resembling a football line-ups diagram, with the first eleven tracks being represented as blue shirted players, and the next eleven tracks represented as orange shirted players. In addition to the twenty-two track version, an abridged version featuring only sixteen of the songs was concurrently released. The album was a commercial success; it had initially debuted at number 11 in the UK Compilation Chart, but peaked at number 10 the following week. It spent six weeks on the chart in total, and was RCA's fourth and penultimate compilation to enter the chart.

Numerous campaigns were launched to promote the album. Coca-Cola, in association with RCA and BMG, released a limited edition 3" mini-CD, also titled The Beautiful Game, which was only available through collecting ring-pulls off special cans of Coca-Cola. The CD features five different songs from artists on the album; "Alright" and "This Time" from the album re-appear, whilst a different song by The Boo Radleys ("Wake Up Boo!") and two exclusive remixes of older Jamiroquai and Massive Attack songs also appear. Massive Attack featured on the front cover of the match-day programme for the Bristol City v York City game on 8 April 1996 after appearing in a friendly match with members of Blur and Supergrass at Wembley Stadium to promote the album. Robert Del Naja from the group was interviewed about the album by John Mitchell for Total Football. The album also found some attention in the United States after a feature on the album written by John Crouch appeared in Billboard magazine on 8 June 1996, and Tim Southwell praised the album in popular men's lifestyle magazine Loaded.

""Ossie's going to Wembley. His knees have gone all trembly?" What the bloody hell was that all about. Christ, if it hadn't been for New Order's "World in Motion" England might, this summer, be walking out to Chas & Dave singing "Gotcha Mr Venables!" Fortunately, for Euro'96 we've been spoiled stupid courtesy of a Britpop album as classy and feisty as a Stuart Pearce tackle. Have some of that, shaky legs!"

— Tim Southwell of Loaded referring to the album.

Several of the songs on the album were released as singles, each of them released by the respective artist's record label rather than 'RCA or BMG. "Three Lions" was released as a single by Epic Records in the UK on 20 May 1996, the same day as the album. It was a huge commercial success, reaching number 1 in the UK Singles Chart for three weeks. It was later certified Platinum by the British Phonographic Industry for sales over 600,000. The single was subtitled "The Official Song of the England Football Team". "England's Irie" was released as a single by Radioactive Records in the UK on 14 June, and reached number 6 in the UK Singles Chart, and number 1 on the UK Indie Singles Chart. Furthermore, the "Euro '96" mix of "Eat My Goal", which does not feature on the album (with the related Black Cats Mix taking its place) was released as a double A-side with "London Tonight" (the lead single from Collapsed Lung's Cooler album) by London Records, reaching number 31 in the UK Singles Chart, whilst the previously unreleased lyrical version of "The Big Man and the Scream Team Meet the Barmy Army Uptown" was released as a limited edition single on Creation Records on 3 June 1996, reaching number 17 in the UK Singles Chart.

Simply Red's "We're in This Together" was promoted as the "official theme song" of the tournament, despite not featuring on the album. Many confuse "Three Lions" to be the official song of the tournament, but is actually the official song of the England team's participation in the tournament, whilst "We're in This Together" was written to accompany the entire tournament and each participating team. "We're in This Together" was part of the same Music & Media campaign as The Beautiful Game to "use music to celebrate England hosting Euro '96". It was released as a single on 10 June 1996 and reached number 11 in the UK Singles Chart. On 10 June 1996, rival label Virgin Records released their own football-themed various artists compilation, The Best Footie Anthems in the World...Ever!, part of their The Best...Album in the World...Ever! compilation series. Featuring twenty-six different football related songs, including two songs that appear on The Beautiful Game ("Three Lions" and "Parklife"), it was ultimately more successful than The Beautiful Game, reaching number 5 in the UK Compilation Chart, despite being released three weeks after it. A follow-album to the Virgin compilation was released in 1998. Two other unofficial compilations were released at the time of UEFA Euro 1996; Cherry Red Records's England's Glory: England Squads & Supporters 1966–1966, which featured 27 official England national team songs from the previous 30 years, and Retro Record's Jeff Astle and the 1970 England World Cup Squad Sing!, originally issued in 1970 as the World Beaters LP.

== Legacy ==
The album was greeted with praise from music buyers. The Baggage published a mixed review of the album that nonetheless said the album contained "some original gems", singling out "England's Irie" as the best song. Tim Southwell of Loaded also praised the album in a piece included in the album's liner notes. Although the album went out of print after the tournament had finished, music on the album was made available elsewhere. "Kickabout" and "Eurochild Ninety 6", for example, were made available as B-sides to Teenage Fanclub and Massive Attack singles released in 1997 and 1998. During the FIFA World Cup 1998, Baddiel, Skinner and The Lightning Seeds re-recorded "Three Lions" with several lyrical changes, becoming "3 Lions '98", which reached number 1 in the UK Singles Charts for two weeks. For the FIFA World Cup 2010, a group named The Squad, made up of Baddiel, Skinner, Broudie and numerous other musicians, recorded another version entitled "Three Lions 2010", which released in 2010 as the lead single from the compilation album England: The Album 2010. This version reached number 21 in the UK Singles Chart. Also in 1998, the "Euro '96 Mix" of "Eat My Goal" was re-released as a single with all previously released remixes of the song, including the "Black Cats Mix", as B-sides, reaching number 18 in the UK Singles Chart. Mark Chapman of Collapsed Lung was against this re-release, calling it a "blatant cash-in" by their former label Deceptive Records. As such, the band refused to play the song on Top of the Pops.

In his 2003 book The Last Party: Britpop, Blair and the Demise of English Rock, writer John Harris recognizes that the album arrived at the peak of "beer'n'footy culture" that was "bolted on to Britpop", saying that "with the beer'n'footy culture peddled by Loaded magazine - and bolted on to Britpop - at its absolute peak, it was hardly surprising that the build-up to the championships caught the imagination of the UK's musicians." He considered The Beautiful Game to be a "commemorative compilation album", with "England's Irie" being "far and away the best" song on the album, saying that the song had set out "to sound a note of cheerleading oomph, but embodying the giggy absurdism that comes with heavy marijuana smoking". Later on in the book, he says the song was also the "most noteworthy contribution", an "invigoratingly silly" song that "tries to be a football song, but can't help dropping the inevitable drug references."

At the end of 1996, "Three Lions" was ranked in several best "Singles of the Year" lists; NME placed it at number 39, Melody Maker at number 44 whilst German magazine Spex ranked it at number 16. In 2003, Q featured it in its list of the "1001 Best Songs Ever", and in its list of "1010 Songs You Must Own" in 2004. Sabotage Times included "England's Irie" in its 2012 list of "7 Great Football Songs You May Not Have Heard". In 2016, a humorous poll from The Guardian listing 10 "alternative suggestions" for England's national anthem revealed votes for "England's Irie". The Beautiful Game was not the only UEFA Euro cup album, as its success inspired the release of Euro 2000: The Official Album to coincide with UEFA Euro 2000, released by Universal Music. The only subsequent UEFA Euro cup has had an accompanying compilation was UEFA Euro 2004, with its official album Vive O 2004!. In 2002, Universal Music also released a compilation titled The Beautiful Game, coinciding with the 2002 FIFA World Cup.

== Track listing ==
1. David Baddiel and Frank Skinner – "Three Lions" (Version One) – 1:58
2. Jamiroquai – "Use the Force" – 3:55
3. Black Grape featuring Joe Strummer and Keith Allen – "England's Irie" – 4:45
4. Teenage Fanclub – "Kickabout" – 3:38
5. Massive Attack – "Eurochild Ninety 6" – 4:22
6. Stereo MC's – "Step It Up" – 3:56
7. New Order – World in Motion 96" (Remix) – 4:56
8. Primal Scream – "The Big Man and the Scream Team Meet the Barmy Army Uptown" (Instrumental) – 4:55
9. The Wannadies – "Might Be Stars" – 3:17
10. Supergrass – "Alright" – 2:59
11. Northern Uproar – "I Am the Cosmos" – 3:17
12. David Baddiel and Frank Skinner – "Three Lions (Version Two)" – 1:02
13. The Beautiful South – "Hooligans Don't Fall In Love" – 4:42
14. Blur – "Parklife" – 3:04
15. The Boo Radleys – "Skywalker" – 2:31
16. The Shamen – "Indica" (On Grass Mix) – 4:59
17. Pulp – "Disco 2000" – 4:32
18. Spectre – "Offside Dub" – 2:59
19. Collapsed Lung – "Eat My Goal" (Black Cats Mix) – 2:27
20. The Gyres – "Break" – 3:02
21. Olive – "This Time" – 3:27
22. Baddiel, Skinner and The Lightning Seeds – "Three Lions" (Final Version) – 3:48

== Chart positions ==
=== Album ===
Chart (1996)	Peak position
UK Compilation Chart	10

=== Singles ===
Single	Chart (1996)	Peak position
"Three Lions"	UK Singles Chart	1
"Three Lions"	German Media Control Charts	49
"Three Lions"	Irish Singles Chart	9
"Three Lions"	Norwegian VG-lista	4
"Three Lions"	Swiss Music Charts	44
"England's Irie"	UK Singles Chart	6
"England's Irie"	UK Indie Singles Chart	1

== See also ==
- UEFA Euro 1996
- Britpop
- Euro 2000: The Official Album
- Vive O 2004!
- England (the album)
