= Calling Your Name (E-Type song) =

1996 single by E-Type

Single by E-Type

from the album The Explorer
- Released: 1996
- Genre: Dance
- Length: 3:37
- Label: Stockholm
- Songwriters: E-Type; Mud
- Producers: E-Type; Kristian Lundin

E-Type singles chronology
"Free Like a Flying Demon" (1996)	"Calling Your Name" (1996)	"Back in the Loop" (1997)

Music video
- "Calling Your Name" on YouTube

"Calling Your Name" is a song by Swedish musician E-Type. It features backing vocals by singers Nana Hedin and Jessica Folcker, and is co-written by E-Type and produced by him with Kristian Lundin. Released in 1996 by Stockholm Records as the second single from the musician's second album, The Explorer (1996), it was a hit in several countries, particularly in Sweden, where it reached number four. The song stayed on the Swedish chart for 8 weeks, from 23 November to 25 January. In the United States, the music video of the song aired on MTV and it peaked at number 17 on the Billboard Dance Club Play chart. The video featured Swedish actor Per Oscarsson, who plays a priest.

In 2011, Swedish singer Mikael Wiehe performed a cover of "Calling Your Name", translated to Swedish as "Jag ropar ditt namn" in the Swedish reality television show "Så mycket bättre".

== Critical reception ==
Pan-European magazine Music & Media wrote, "The Swedish E-Type comes up with a midtempo dance track. The original radio edit is reminiscent of Ace of Base, whereas The Antiloop Garage radio edit delivers more drive."

== Music video ==
The accompanying music video for "Calling Your Name" is filmed in a church. E-Type plays as the bridegroom that is going to be married. He stands by the altar, by a priest (played by renowned Swedish actor Per Oscarsson), waiting for his bride to arrive at the church. The bride arrives and walks down the aisle holding hands with her father. The church is crowded. When the priest asks the man if he wants to marry his bride, E-Type changes his mind and runs out of the church. The bride is left in shock by the altar, crying by the priest. The video doesn't feature Nana Hedin or Jessica Folcker.

"Calling Your Name" was later made available on E-Type's official YouTube channel in 2016, and had generated more than six million views as of early 2026.

== Track listings ==
- 12-inch single, Sweden
1. "Calling Your Name" (Pierre J's Q-Type Mix) — 5:47
2. "Calling Your Name" (Radio Edit) — 3:35
3. "Calling Your Name" (Antiloop Garage Club Mix) — 5:42
4. "Calling Your Name" (Antiloop Garage Radio Mix) — 3:55
- CD single, Europe
1. "Calling Your Name" (Radio Edit) — 3:35
2. "This Is the Way" (UK Knife & Fork Euro Edit) — 3:47
- CD maxi, UK
1. "Calling Your Name" (Radio Edit) — 3:35
2. "Calling Your Name" (Pierre J's Q-Type Mix) — 5:47
3. "Calling Your Name" (Antiloop Garage Radio Mix) — 3:55
4. "Calling Your Name" (Antiloop Garage Club Mix) — 5:42

== Charts ==
=== Weekly charts ===
Chart (1996–1997)	Peak position
Sweden (Sverigetopplistan)	4
Sweden (Swedish Dance Chart)	4
US Dance Club Play (Billboard)	17

=== Year-end charts ===
Chart (1996)	Position
Sweden (Topplistan)	42
Sweden (Swedish Dance Chart)	23

Chart (1997)	Position
Sweden (Topplistan)	82
