= Oranje boven =

Dutch folksong

Oranje boven (Dutch pronunciation: [oˈrɑɲə ˈbovə(n)] lit. 'Orange Above') is a Dutch pro-monarchy folk song which represents Dutch fondness for its royal family, the House of Orange-Nassau. It is a contrafact, sharing the same melody as the children's song "We zijn er bijna (lit. 'We are almost there')".

== Origin ==
The "Prinsenvlag" displaying an orange strip instead of red at the top which the phrase refers to.

The song has its origins in the late 19th century, when Emma of Waldeck and Pyrmont became regent of the Netherlands between 1890 and 1898. The song soon grew in popularity especially during World War II, the song was frequently sung as a sign of resistance. "Oranje boven" refers to the Prince's tricolour of William the Silent which originated between 1588 and 1630 as a symbol used by the watergeuzen (lit. 'Sea Beggars') and later by those whose allegiance was with the Dutch during the Eighty Years' War against Spain. The tricolour became a symbol of freedom and Dutch nationalism even after the orange was replaced by red with the Statenvlag and many people still fly an orange pennon above the national flag on public holidays, although the "prinsenvlag" in the modern day is seen as controversial due to its use by the now defunct, far-right organisation "National Socialist Movement in the Netherlands" or "NSB" which led to it becoming a symbol of the Dutch far-right. Nevertheless, the song still sees moderate popularity and is often sung on Koningsdag (lit. 'King's Day') and Prinsjesdag (lit. 'Little Prince's Day'), as well as during royal visits, and sporting events.

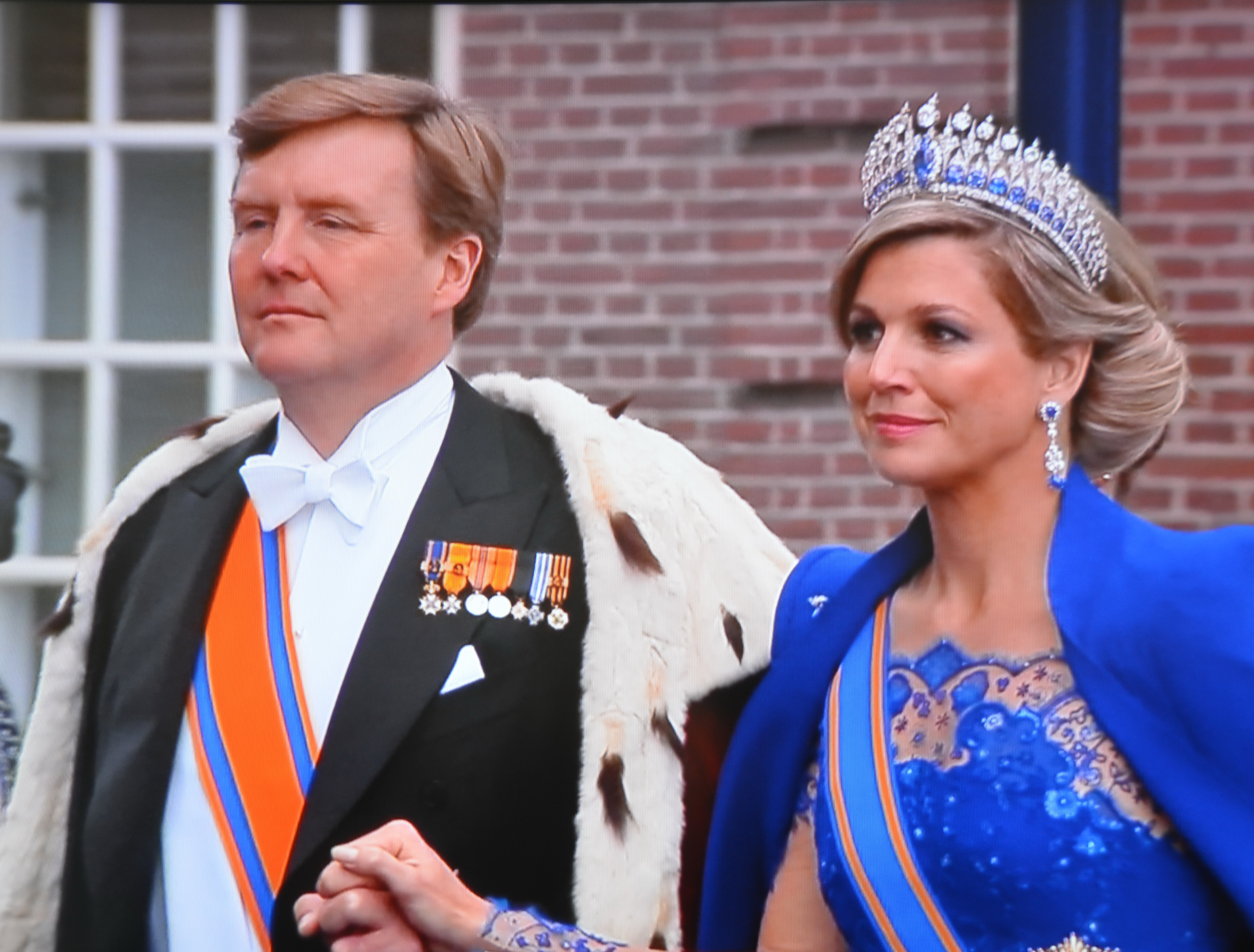
King Willem-Alexander and Queen Maxima soon after the coronation.

After the abdication of Queen Beatrix and the inauguration of King Willem-Alexander on 30 April 2013, for the first time in over 120 years a king sat on the Dutch throne. The lyrics of the song were not appropriate for a male monarch, which led to a decline in its usage. Some alternatives to adapt to the male monarch have been suggested and implemented to some extent, such as "leve het koningspaar (lit. 'long live the royal couple')" to the original tune or, with the addition of a few notes, "leve de koning en de koningin (lit. 'long live the king and queen')".

== Lyrics ==
Original text	English translation
Oranje boven, Oranje boven, Leve de koningin! Leve de koningin!	Orange above, Orange above, Long live the queen! Long live the queen!

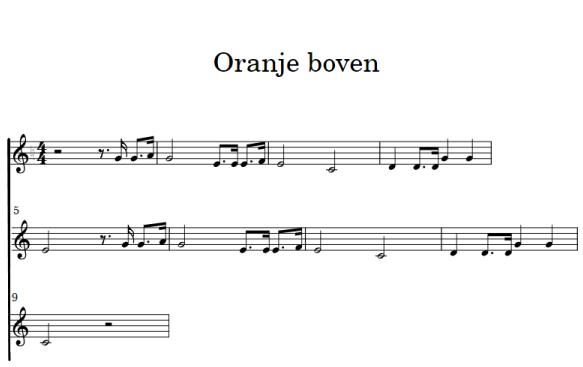
Melody of "Oranje Boven" and "we zijn er bijna"

=== Contrafact ===
Oranje boven is a contrafact of the children's song "We zijn er bijna" which "Oranje Boven" borrows its lyrical structure and melody."We zijn er bijna"s lyrics are shown below:

Original text	English translation
We zijn er bijna, we zijn er bijna Maar nog niet helemaal Maar nog niet helemaal	We are almost there We are almost there But not quite yet But not quite yet

== In popular culture ==
- The refrain of the song "Campione 2000" by Swedish musician E-Type, the official song of the UEFA Euro championship 2000 (organised in the Netherlands and Belgium) resembles to the chorus of "Oranje boven".
- Dutch actor, singer, writer and producer, Jon van Eerd released a comedy titled "Oranje boven".
- Dutch comedian and celebrity André van Duin released a single called "Oranje boven" in February 2013 under his own management. He used the original lyrics as the refrain although replacing the phrase "Leve de koningin" with "Leve de koning en Máxima" in connection to the abdication of Queen Beatrix. The song was a commercial failure.
- Sophie Straat released a song for her album "Smartlap is niet dood" released on the 3rd of March 2023 called "Oranje boven" The song is critical of the Dutch monarchy, especially the funding they get, and calls for the Dutch people to renounce the monarchy.
- In the 1977 film A Bridge Too Far the song is sung by the people of Eindhoven celebrating its liberation by Allied troops in 1944.
- Dutch hardcore act Euromasters released an eponymous record in January 1993 on Rotterdam Records, in which at the end a spoof of the Dutch jury for the Eurovision song contest of the year prior is heard. Notably, the Amsterdam entry gets awarded no points.
