= Living It Up (Stakka Bo song) =

"Living It Up" is a 1993 music single by Stakka Bo from his 1993 album Supermarket.

The song peaked at #38 on the Swedish chart.

The song features a lead vocal by Stakka Bo and Oskar Franzén, with additional vocals by Nana Hedin.

== Music video ==
The music video has a water theme and is set in a white space with Stakka Bo, Oskar Franzén and Nana Hedin performing. UNICEF Goodwill Ambassador Roger Moore appears in the video saying "Children in Nepal need fresh water. You can help."

== Personnel ==
- Stakka Bo – lead vocals, co-producer
- Oskar Franzén – lead vocals
- Nana Hedin – backing vocals
- Niclas von der Burg – bass
- Jonas von der Burg – keyboards, programming, producer, engineer, writer
- Magnus Lindsten – additional keyboards
- Martin Renck – guitar, sleeve, design
- David Wilczewski – flute
- Johan Renck – writer
- Klas Hjertberg – photography
