= Living It Up (disambiguation) =

Living It Up is a 1954 comedy film starring Dean Martin and Jerry Lewis.

Living It Up or Livin' It Up may also refer to:

== Film and television ==
- Living It Up (1966 film), a French-German film
- Living It Up (1994 film), an Italian film
- Living It Up (2000 film), a Spanish film
- Living It Up (British TV series), a 1957-1958 sitcom
- Living It Up (Philippine TV program), a 2007 lifestyle show
- Living It Up! with Ali & Jack, a 2003-2004 American syndicated daytime talk show

== Music ==
=== Albums ===
- Livin' It Up!, by Sammy Hagar and The Waboritas, 2006
- Livin' It Up (album), by George Strait, 1990
- Living It Up, by Bert Kaempfert, or the title song, 1963
- Livin' It Up!, by Jimmy Smith, 1968

=== Songs ===
- ""Livin' It Up" (Ciara song), 2013
- ""Livin' It Up" (Ja Rule song), 2001
- ""Livin' It Up" (Northern Uproar song), 1996
- ""Living It Up" (Stakka Bo song), 1993
- "The Sun Goes Down (Living It Up)", by Level 42, 1983
- "Livin' It Up", by Limp Bizkit from Chocolate Starfish and the Hot Dog Flavored Water, 2000
- "Living It Up", by Rickie Lee Jones from Pirates, 1981
- "Living It Up", by People!, 1969
- "Livin It Up", by Young Thug featuring Post Malone and ASAP Rocky from Punk, 2021
- "Livin' It Up", by Hieroglyphics from The Kitchen, 2013

== Other uses ==
- Living It Up: Humorous Adventures in Hyperdomesticity, a 1996 book by Karen Finley
- Livin' It Up with The Bratz, a 2006 interactive DVD in the Bratz franchise

== See also ==
- Live It Up (disambiguation)
