= Here I Go Again (E-Type song) =

1998 single by E-Type

Single by E-Type

from the album Last Man Standing
- Released: 26 November 1998
- Genre: Eurodance
- Length: 3:55
- Label: Stockholm
- Songwriters: E-Type; Mud
- Producers: Kristian Lundin; Max Martin; E-Type

E-Type singles chronology
"Angels Crying" (1998)	"Here I Go Again" (1998)	"Princess of Egypt" (1999)

Music video
- "Here I Go Again" on YouTube

"Here I Go Again" is a song by Swedish singer-songwriter E-Type. It was released in November 1998 as the second single from his third album, Last Man Standing and was a hit in several countries, particularly in Sweden and Finland, where it reached number one. Chorus vocals are performed by Nana Hedin.

== Critical reception ==
Pan-European magazine Music & Media wrote, "Packing several hooks and a peppy Eurobeat, the track is lushly produced with more than a hint of Jim Steinman's "more is better" approach. Pure pop, very Scandi and very programmable."

== Music video ==
The accompanying music video followed up the theme from "Angels Crying" by featuring a homage to horror movies. It was directed by Mikeodelica. While the video for "Angels Crying" was similar to Friday the 13th, "Here I Go Again" had the same plot as Poltergeist.

The music video includes a reference to a previous song by E-Type, "This Is the Way", which was also the second single of the first album. The song can be heard in the car stereo, while the car of the party goers arrives in the vacation venue.

== Track listing ==
CD maxi

1. "Here I Go Again" (radio version) — 3:55
2. "Here I Go Again" (Richi's extended version) — 7:05
3. "Here I Go Again" (Disco 2000 remix) — 4:54
4. "Here I Go Again" (extended version) — 7:36

== Charts ==
=== Weekly charts ===
Chart (1998–1999)	Peak position
Belgium (Ultratip Bubbling Under Flanders)	9
Denmark (IFPI)	4
Europe (Eurochart Hot 100)	28
Finland (Suomen virallinen lista)	1
France (SNEP)	25
Netherlands (Dutch Top 40 Tipparade)	13
Netherlands (Single Top 100)	72
Norway (VG-lista)	3
Sweden (Sverigetopplistan)	1

=== Year-end charts ===
Chart (1998)	Position
Sweden (Hitlistan)	14

Chart (1999)	Position
Romania (Romanian Top 100)	18

== Certifications ==
Region	Certification	Certified units/sales
Norway (IFPI Norway)	Platinum	
Sweden (GLF)	Platinum	30,000^{^}
^{^} Shipments figures based on certification alone.
