= Life (E-Type song) =

Single by E-Type

from the album Euro IV Ever
- Released: October 2001
- Length: 3:42
- Label: Stockholm
- Songwriter(s): E-Type
- Producer(s): Kristian Lundin, John Amatiello, Max Martin, Rami

E-Type singles chronology
| "Campione 2000" (2000) | "Life" (2001) | "Africa" (2002) |

"Life" is a song by the Swedish musician E-Type featuring vocals from Na Na. It was released in October 2001 as the second single from his third album Euro IV Ever and was a hit in several countries, particularly in Sweden and Norway, where it reached the top three.

== Track listing ==
CD maxi – Europe (2001)

1. "Life" (radio version) – 3:42
2. "Life" (extended version) – 4:23
3. "Life" (Pierre J's New-Type remix) – 8:33
4. "Life" (Pierre J's radio mix) – 3:58

== Charts ==
=== Weekly charts ===
| Chart (2001–2002) | Peak position |
|---|---|
| Finland (Suomen virallinen lista) | 16 |
| Norway (VG-lista) | 3 |
| Romania (Romanian Top 100) | 12 |
| Sweden (Sverigetopplistan) | 1 |

=== Year-end charts ===
| Chart (2001) | Position |
|---|---|
| Sweden (Hitlistan) | 6 |
| Chart (2002) | Position |
| Sweden (Hitlistan) | 39 |

== Certifications ==
| Region | Certification | Certified units/sales |
|---|---|---|
| Norway (IFPI Norway) | Gold | |
| Sweden (GLF) | Platinum | 30,000^{^} |
^{^} Shipments figures based on certification alone.
