= Euro IV Ever =

Studio album by E-Type
- Released: 21 November 2001
- Genre: Eurodance, Pop
- Length: 57:16 (iTunes)
- Label: Stockholm Records
- Producer: Max Martin

E-Type chronology
Last Man Standing (1998)	Euro IV Ever (2001)	Loud Pipes Save Lives (2004)

Euro IV Ever is the fourth studio album by the Swedish eurodance artist E-Type, which was released in 2001. It contains the singles "Life", "Africa" and "Campione 2000", the last of which was made as the official tie-in song of the 2000 UEFA European Football Championship.

== Track listing ==
No.	Title	Writer(s)	Producer(s)	Length
1.	"Norby IV Ever" (Live at Dreamland)	E-Type	E-Type; Daniel Papalexis; Kadir Taysir^{[a]}	1:28
2.	"Life" (featuring Na Na)	E-Type; Mud	John Amatiello; Max Martin; Rami; Kristian Lundin	3:42
3.	"Africa" (radio version) (featuring Na Na)	E-Type; Mud	Amatiello; Papalexis; Rami; Martin	3:38
4.	"Banca Banca"	E-Type; Mud	Rob 'n' Raz; Lars "Lurch" Sander^{[a]}	3:05
5.	"Arabian Star" (Live at Dreamland) (featuring Na Na)	E-Type; Mud	Papalexis; E-Type; Taysir^{[a]}	3:52
6.	"When I Close My Eyes" (featuring Na Na)	E-Type; Mud	Patrik Henzel	4:07
7.	"Loneliness – Ring the Alarm"	E-Type	Papalexis; E-Type; Taysir^{[a]}	3:25
8.	"Star"	E-Type; Mud	Peter Boström; Joakim Udd	4:15
9.	"Time" (featuring Na Na)	E-Type; Mud	Tremolo	4:14
10.	"No More Tears" (featuring Na Na)	E-Type; Mud	Vasco & Millboy	3:37
11.	"Borschstjii" (featuring Marki–Markki The Dragon Killer)	E-Type	E-Type	4:02
12.	"Campione 2000" (bonus track)	Kent Brainerd; Rick Blaskey; E-Type; Mud	Brainerd; E-Type; Amatiello	3:33
13.	"Oh Weda" (song from Sveakampen)	E-Type	E-Type	1:56

Notes

- ^a signifies a co-producer

== Charts ==
=== Weekly charts ===
Chart (2001)	Peak position
Finnish Albums (Suomen virallinen lista)	3
Norwegian Albums (VG-lista)	7
Swedish Albums (Sverigetopplistan)	2

=== Year-end charts ===
Chart (2001)	Position
Swedish Albums (Sverigetopplistan)	18
Chart (2002)	Position
Swedish Albums (Sverigetopplistan)	81

== Certifications ==
Region	Certification	Certified units/sales
Finland (Musiikkituottajat)	Gold	31,493
Sweden (GLF)	Platinum	80,000^{^}
^{^} Shipments figures based on certification alone.
