= Princess of Egypt =

Single by E-Type

from the album Last Man Standing
- Released: 1999
- Length: 3:39
- Label: Stockholm
- Songwriters: E-Type; Mud
- Producers: David Kreuger; Per Magnusson

E-Type singles chronology
"Here I Go Again" (1998)	"Princess of Egypt" (1999)	"Hold Your Horses" (1999)

Music video
- "Princess of Egypt" on YouTube

"Princess of Egypt" is a song by Swedish musician E-Type. It was released in 1999 by Stockholm Records as the third single from his third album, Last Man Standing (1998), and is a tribute to his longtime backing vocalist Nana Hedin. Produced by David Kreuger and Per Magnusson, it peaked at number nine on the Swedish singles chart and spent 11 weeks on the chart. It also charted in Finland and Romania. The maxi-single includes the music video of his previous single, "Here I Go Again".

== Track listings ==
- CD single, Germany
1. "Princess of Egypt" (Radio Version) – 3:39
2. "Princess of Egypt" (Extended Version) – 5:08
- CD maxi, Sweden
1. "Princess of Egypt" (Radio Version) – 3:39
2. "Princess of Egypt" (Pierre J's Q-Type Remix) – 7:00
3. "Princess of Egypt" (Pinocchio Remix) – 5:43
4. "Princess of Egypt" (Extended Version) – 5:08
5. "Here I Go Again" (Video) – 4:39

== Charts ==
=== Weekly charts ===
Chart (1999)	Peak position
Finland (Suomen virallinen lista)	17
Sweden (Sverigetopplistan)	9

=== Year-end charts ===
Chart (1999)	Position
Romania (Romanian Top 100)	65
Sweden (Hitlistan)	96
