= Here We Go (Stakka Bo song) =

1993 single by Stakka Bo

Single by Stakka Bo

from the album Supermarket
- Released: 1993
- Genre: Pop
- Length: 3:58
- Label: Stockholm
- Songwriters: Jonas von der Burg; Stakka Bo
- Producer: Jonas von der Burg

Stakka Bo singles chronology
"Here We Go" (1993)	"Down the Drain" (1993)

Music video
- "Here We Go" on YouTube

"Here We Go" is a song by Swedish artist and film/music video director Stakka Bo (real name: Johan Renck), released in 1993 by Stockholm Records as the first single from Bo's debut album, Supermarket (1993). The song features vocals by Bo himself, alongside Swedish singers Nana Hedin, Monica Hultén, Katarina Wilczewski and Oskar Franzén, with flute by David Wilczewski. It was written by Stakka Bo and Jonas von der Burg, and produced by von der Burg.

"Here We Go" charted in several countries, peaking at number four in Sweden. The artist and song was compared by many music critics to English hip hop/electronic dance group Stereo MC's, and the accompanying music video, directed by Bo, was played frequently on music channels such as MTV Europe. "Here We Go" was nominated in the category for Best Swedish Dance Track 1993 at the Swedish Dance Music Awards 1994.

== Background ==
While at university, Johan Renck (Stakka Bo) dated La Camilla of Swedish band Army of Lovers, who introduced him to the Swedish music business. He started out as one half of Eurodance duo E-Type + Stakka B, but went solo after their two singles, "We Got the Atmosphere" (1991) and "Numania 1" (1992), continuing to release music as Stakka Bo.

== Critical reception ==
AllMusic editor Ryan Randall Goble stated that "this upbeat and fun pop music [is] the clear offspring of early-'90s genre-bending in pop, hip-hop, and alternative". J. D. Considine from The Baltimore Sun mentioned "the cutting critique of consumerism that bubbles beneath the surface", and called it "irresistibly catchy". Larry Flick from Billboard magazine wrote that "high on energy and heavy on the accent, this well-crafted British rap attack invades the body, mind, and soul." He added, "Conga drums and fluttering flutes join a strong-piped female backing vocal to create this eccentric, lively track. With radio finally opening its mind to overseas rap, this Stereo MC's-like entry should fit right in at both top 40 and rhythm crossover." Swedish Expressen viewed it as "very funny". Dave Sholin from the Gavin Report felt Stakka Bo "has a sound that's reminiscent of the Stereo MC's and one hot chorus that gets stronger every time it's played." Caroline Sullivan from The Guardian said, "Bo recites couplets like "Here we go, go, go to the temple of consumption/ Get your gear and start to spend" as if he'd just discovered something novel about human nature. It's so annoying that it detracts from his succulent way with a melody."

In his weekly UK chart commentary, James Masterton wrote, "Just for a change we have MTV to thank for this one. So strong was this debut single from the Swedish group that the music video channel which normally gives dance a wide berth, leaped on it immediately." He concluded, "One of the more brilliant pop records in the charts at the moment." Pan-European magazine Music & Media felt Bo was "in the same league" with the Stereo MC's, and added that the tune was "very radio-friendly". Alan Jones from Music Week named it a "impressive debut" and "an easy-paced affair with a friendly rap, an oft-repeated femme voice intoning the title and some cool flute tootling, it's got to happen." Karen Holmes from The Network Forty noted its "ska music influences", declaring it as "a dance flavored pop single". Stuart Bailie from NME commented, "The Swedish Stereo MC's — how odd. Stakka Bo marshall a nippy flute solo, dress like undercover Drug Squad officers and get to say "correlation" in a Cockernee accent." James Hamilton from the RM Dance Update described it as "Stereo MC's meet Ace of Base style". Mike Soutar from Smash Hits gave it a full score of five out of five and named it Best New Single. He felt that "this tune could get the most depressed person you know putting away their razor blades. Breezier than a string vest on Ben Nevis, 'Here We Go' is like Stereo MC's without the right-on element, or the Shamen without technological paraphernalia. Except better."

== Chart performance ==
"Here We Go" entered the top 10 in Austria, Denmark, Iceland, Ireland, Norway, Sweden, and Switzerland. In Bo's native Sweden, it entered at number 25 on 19 May 1993 before peaking four weeks later at number four, spending nine weeks inside Topplistan chart. Additionally, it was a top-20 hit in Germany, the Netherlands, and the United Kingdom, as well as on the Eurochart Hot 100. In the UK, "Here We Go" entered the UK Singles Chart at number 19 and peaked at number 13 on 26 September 1993. The single spent two weeks at that position and eight weeks within the UK top 100. On the Eurochart Hot 100, the single debuted at number 76 on 26 June, after charting in Sweden. It peaked at number 17 on 16 October, 17 weeks later. In West Asia, it became a top-10 hit in Israel, peaking at number ten on 28 July 1993. In the US, "Here We Go" reached number 20 on the Billboard Modern Rock Tracks chart while reaching number nine on the Bubbling Under Hot 100 Singles chart, spending six weeks on that chart.

== Airplay ==
"Here We Go" was positioned at number three when the first European Music & Media airplay chart Border Breakers was compiled due to crossover airplay in western central, central north-west and southern Europe. It peaked at number two on the following week. On their European Dance Radio chart and Hit Radio chart, the song peaked at numbers 11 and 29 in October and November 1993. In the UK, it reached number 14 on the UK Airplay chart by Music Week in the middle of October same year.

== Music video ==
The music video produced to promote the single was directed by Stakka Bo himself, due to a very tight budget. The video is set in a splitscreen brown space with Stakka Bo and Oskar Franzén performing on each side, while model/dancer Alma Jansson-Eklund is intercut during the chorus, lipsyncing to Nana Hedin's vocals. Franzén also dances, partially in a mime style and lipsynchs to the chorusand one verse. The final part of the video shows a succession of luxury goods such as a fibre-optic lamp, a Newton's cradle and a wave motion machine, illustrating the "temple of consumption" mentioned in the song's chorus. MTV Europe played the video frequently. Katrine Ring from Danish Gaffa praised it as "charming". An image from the video is used on the cover for the single.

== Track listing ==
7-inch single, UK (1993)
No.	Title	Length
1.	"Here We Go"	3:53
2.	"Happyman"	3:48

12-inch single, UK (1993)
No.	Title	Length
1.	"Here We Go" (12-inch version)	5:45
2.	"Here We Go" (7-inch version)	3:53
3.	"Happyman"	3:48

CD single, UK and Europe (1993)
No.	Title	Length
1.	"Here We Go" (7-inch)	3:53
2.	"Here We Go" (12-inch)	5:45
3.	"Happyman"	3:48
4.	"Natural"	3:15

== Personnel ==
- Bass guitar: Niclas von der Burg
- Flute: David Wilczewski
- Guitar: Martin Renck, Niclas von der Burg
- Keyboards: Magnus Lindsten, Mats Karlsson
- Vocals: Oskar Franzén, Stakka Bo
- Background vocals: Katarina Wilczewski, Monica Hultén, Nana Hedin

== Charts ==
=== Weekly charts ===
Chart (1993)	Peak position
Austria (Ö3 Austria Top 40)	6
Belgium (Ultratop 50 Flanders)	45
Denmark (IFPI)	10
Europe (Eurochart Hot 100)	17
Europe (European Dance Radio)	11
Europe (European Hit Radio)	29
Germany (GfK)	15
Iceland (Íslenski Listinn Topp 40)	5
Ireland (IRMA)	8
Israel (Israeli Singles Chart)	10
Netherlands (Dutch Top 40)	20
Netherlands (Single Top 100)	23
Norway (VG-lista)	10
Sweden (Sverigetopplistan)	4
Switzerland (Schweizer Hitparade)	7
UK Singles (Official Charts)	13
UK Airplay (Music Week)	14
UK Dance (Music Week)	17
US Modern Rock Tracks (Billboard)	20

=== Year-end charts ===
Chart (1993)	Position
Europe (Eurochart Hot 100)	78
Germany (Media Control)	81
Iceland (Íslenski Listinn Topp 40)	76
Netherlands (Dutch Top 40)	184
Sweden (Topplistan)	40

== Release history ==
Region	Date	Format(s)	Label(s)	Ref.
Sweden	1993	12-inch vinyl; CD	Stockholm	
United Kingdom	13 September 1993	7-inch vinyl; 12-inch vinyl; CD; cassette	Stockholm; Polydor	
Australia	24 January 1994	CD; cassette	Stockholm; Polydor	
