= UEFA Euro 2004 (video game) =

2004 video game

UEFA Euro 2004: Portugal
- Developer: EA Canada
- Publisher: EA Sports
- Series: UEFA Euro
- Platforms: Microsoft Windows, Xbox, PlayStation 2
- Release: NA: May 4, 2004; EU: May 7, 2004
- Genres: Sports, Football
- Modes: Single-player, Multiplayer

UEFA Euro 2004 is the official licensed video game of UEFA Euro 2004 football tournament hosted in Portugal. The game was developed by EA Canada and published by EA Sports. It was released for Microsoft Windows, Xbox and PlayStation 2.

It is the second game from EA Sports based on the quadrennial UEFA European Championship and features all 51 national teams from the respective qualifying round.

The commentary is provided by John Motson and Ally McCoist.

== Gameplay ==
A friendly match between Portugal and England. The lighting, saturation and weather system were improved to better resemble Portugal's Mediterranean climate.

UEFA Euro 2004 uses a tweaked and improved version of the graphics engine from FIFA 2004 and introduces many new gameplay features and game modes to both the UEFA Euro and FIFA series.

== UEFA national teams ==
The game includes 51 playable national football teams.

== Development ==
Electronic Arts made the game's development public on February 6, 2004, when it announced that it had signed an agreement with UEFA to develop, publish and distribute the official game based on UEFA Euro 2004 championship that would begin on June 12 of that same year in Portugal.

The game was developed by EA Canada, the studio behind the development of the FIFA series of video games.

== Soundtrack ==
For the soundtrack, the developers specifically chose rock-based tracks due to the genre's big resurgence in Europe at the time.

EA Sports Trax
No.	Title	Artist	Length
1.	"Panic Attack"	Parva	5:34
2.	"Baby's Come Back"	Span	3:21
3.	"Watermelon"	Boxer Rebellion	3:47
4.	"Bright and Shining Sun"	The Walls	3:59
5.	"Do You Love Yourself"	Glitterati	2:21
6.	"Billy Club"	Junkie XL	4:02
7.	"Força"	Nelly Furtado	4:00
8.	"Here We Go"	Stakka Bo	4:21
9.	"Way of Life"	Dave Clarke	6:35
10.	"Come Let Me Know"	FreQ Nasty	4:53
11.	"The Long Face"	Mínus	4:55

== Reception ==
Reception

Aggregate score
Aggregator	Score		
Aggregator	PC	PS2	Xbox
Metacritic	76/100	76/100	74/100

Review scores
Publication	Score		
Publication	PC	PS2	Xbox
Eurogamer	N/A	N/A	6/10
Game Informer	N/A	7.25/10	7.25/10
GamePro	N/A	3.5/5	3.5/5
GameSpot	8.5/10	8.2/10	8.3/10
GameSpy	N/A	4/5	N/A
GameZone	8.2/10	8.5/10	8.4/10
IGN	8/10	8/10	N/A
Official U.S. PlayStation Magazine	N/A	4.5/5	N/A
Official Xbox Magazine (US)	N/A	N/A	7.9/10
PC Gamer (US)	80%	N/A	N/A
The Times	4/5	4/5	4/5

UEFA Euro 2004: Portugal received "generally favorable reviews" on all platforms except the Xbox version, which received "average" reviews, according to the review aggregation website Metacritic. GameSpot favored its gameplay and options in comparison to FIFA 2004 and praised the Windows version in particular for the improved visuals and online multiplayer. IGN specially praised the sound design of the game, stating that "the commentary is spot-on and not often repetitive, as we've come to expect. What's really impressive, however, is the crowd noise. Country-specific chants are a nice touch, and the din of the crowd overall is synched well with the action on the field."

However, the PlayStation 2 version was criticized for its inferior graphics, frame rate issues, and lack of online multiplayer when compared to the Xbox and PC versions respectively.

== Sales ==
UEFA Euro 2004: Portugal was a commercial success, selling over one million units during the first month after release.
