= Last Man Standing (E-Type album) =

- Main cover, except for the Japanese edition. The Japanese cover has the same cover as the lead single's cover, "Angels Crying".

Studio album by E-Type
- Released: 27 November 1998
- Recorded: 1998
- Genres: Eurodance, Pop
- Length: 47:17
- Label: Stockholm Records
- Producers: E-Type, Max Martin, Kristian Lundin, Per Magnusson, David Kreuger

E-Type chronology
The Explorer (1996)	Last Man Standing (1998)	Euro IV Ever (2001)

Singles from Last Man Standing
- 1. "Angels Crying" Released: 1998; 2. "Here I Go Again" Released: 26 November 1998; 3. "Princess of Egypt" Released: 1999

Last Man Standing is the third studio album by Swedish singer-songwriter E-Type, which was released in 1998. It contains hit songs "Angels Crying", "Here I Go Again" and "Princess of Egypt". Nana Hedin provided much of the female lead vocals. The album debuted at number one on the Finnish Albums Chart, staying in the top for total 6 weeks. In Sweden the album peaked at number 1, going platinum. The US and Japanese editions of the album were released with different cover art.

The video for "Angels Crying" was based on Friday the 13th.

== Track listing ==
No.	Title	Writer(s)	Note(s)	Length
1.	"Ultimos Homo Statans (Last Man Standing)"	E-Type	performed by Westra Aros Pijpare	0:57
2.	"Angels Crying"	E-Type/Mud	Chorus vocals by Nana Hedin	3:50
3.	"Here I Go Again"	E-Type/Mud	Chorus vocals by Nana Hedin	3:53
4.	"Princess of Egypt"	E-Type/Mud	Chorus vocals by Jeanette Soderholm	3:39
5.	"Hold Your Horses"	E-Type/Mud	Chorus vocals by Nana Hedin	4:01
6.	"I'm Flying"	E-Type/Mud	Chorus vocals by Nana Hedin	4:19
7.	"Morning Light"	E-Type/Mud/Kristian Lundin	Chorus vocals by Nana Hedin and Andreas Carlsson	3:33
8.	"I'll Always Be Around"	E-Type/Andreas Carlsson	Chorus vocals by Andreas Carlsson and Jeanette Olsson	3:40
9.	"Walk Away"	E-Type/Andreas Carlsson	Chorus vocals by Andreas Carlsson and George	3:30
10.	"I'll Find a Way"	E-Type/Mud	Chorus vocals by Nana Hedin and Andreas Carlsson	3:35
11.	"So Far Away"	E-Type/Mud/Rami	Chorus vocals by Nana Hedin	6:45
12.	"Angels Country"	E-Type/Mud	performed by Tumbleweed Trail	4:01
13.	"PoP Preludium"	E-Type	performed by Westra Aros Pijpare	1:34

== Charts ==
Chart (1998)	Peak position
Finnish Albums (Suomen virallinen lista)	1
Norwegian Albums (VG-lista)	2
Swedish Albums (Sverigetopplistan)	1

== Certifications ==
Region	Certification	Certified units/sales
Finland (Musiikkituottajat)	Platinum	68,720
Norway (IFPI Norway)	Platinum	50,000^{*}
Sweden (GLF)	2× Platinum	160,000^{^}
^{*} Sales figures based on certification alone.^{^} Shipments figures based on certification alone.
