= Made in Sweden (album) =

Studio album by E-Type
- Released: 31 October 1994 (Sweden); 30 April 1996 (U.S.)
- Genre: Eurodance
- Length: 43:07
- Label: Stockholm Records 523 930-2; Ils International (U.S.)
- Producer: E-Type; Denniz PoP; Max Martin; John Amatiello; Kristian Lundin

E-Type chronology
Made in Sweden (1994)	The Explorer (1996)

Professional ratings
Review scores
Source	Rating
Music & Media	(favorable)

Made in Sweden is the debut studio album by Swedish singer-songwriter E-Type, released by Stockholm Records on 31 October 1994.

== Release ==
Made in Sweden was promoted with the release of the single "Do You Always (Have to Be Alone)?". It features vocals by singer Nana Hedin and became a top 20 hit in Sweden, peaking at number 13. Another single, "Russian Lullaby", peaked at number 45 in Sweden and number 35 in France. The album was nominated in the category for Best Swedish Dance Album 1994 at the 1995 Swedish Dance Music Awards.

== Critical reception ==
Pan-European magazine Music & Media wrote, "The country of origin firmly stamped on it means a strong recommendation for top flight Euro product. 'Set the World On Fire' was a summer hit in Sweden; 'This Is the Way' is the current number 1. Long-haired E-Type is surrounded by the proverbial female backup singer(s), but isn't pretending to be a black rapper. With that weird half singing/half speaking voice, he's rather like the Troggs' Reg Presley branching out to dance. The producer's name is a guarantee for Pop sense. Almost blindfolded one can select three more singles: the ragga track 'So Dem Come', the shamelessly Euro number 'Fight Them Back' and the Oriental-flavoured reggae 'When Religion Comes To Town'."

== Track listing ==
No.	Title	Writer(s)	Note(s)	Length
1.	"Made in Sweden"	E-Type	Performed by Mr. Maple	1:35
2.	"Set the World on Fire"	E-Type, Mud	Chorus vocals by Nana Hedin	3:43
3.	"This Is the Way"	E-Type, Mud	Chorus vocals by Nana Hedin, Jeanette Söderholm and Max Martin	3:54
4.	"So dem a com"	E-Type, Mud, Herbie, Chilly White	Chorus vocals by Chilly White and Hanna Wangard	3:30
5.	"Fight It Back"	E-Type, Mud	Chorus vocals by Nana Hedin and Max Martin	3:27
6.	"Until the End"	E-Type, Mud	Chorus vocals by Nana Hedin, Birgitta Edoff and Max Martin	3:30
7.	"When Religion Comes to Town"	E-Type, Mud	Chorus vocals by Charoula	3:21
8.	"Will I See You Again?"	E-Type, Mud	Chorus vocals by Nana Hedin	3:59
9.	"Do You Always (Have to Be Alone)?"	E-Type	Chorus vocals by Nana Hedin	4:07
10.	"Russian Lullaby"	Jonas "Joker" Berggren, E-Type	Chorus vocals by Max Martin, Jonas "Joker" Berggren and Jeanette Söderholm	3:12
11.	"Me No Want Miseria (Take Me to the End)"	E-Type, Herbie, Max Martin	Chorus vocals by Nana Hedin	4:49
12.	"Set the World Unplugged"	E-Type, Mud	Chorus vocals by Kristina Hansson and Terese Westlund	4:00

== Credits ==
- Co-producer – E-Type
- Design [Sleeve] – Mikael P. Eriksson, Reagera, Tomas Perman [D.D.D]
- Executive producer – Denniz Pop
- Lyrics by – E-Type, Mud (3) (tracks: 2 to 8, 10, 12)
- Mastered by – Björn Engelmann
- Music by – E-Type (tracks: 1 to 9, 11, 12)
- Producer – Denniz PoP (tracks: 2 to 5, 11), E-Type (tracks: 1, 7, 10, 12), Max Martin (tracks: 3, 5, 9 to 11)

== Charts ==
Chart (1994)	Peak position
French Albums (SNEP)	10
Swedish Albums (Sverigetopplistan)	2

== Certifications ==
Region	Certification	Certified units/sales
France (SNEP)	Gold	100,000^{*}
^{*} Sales figures based on certification alone.^{^} Shipments figures based on certification alone.
