= Flexx =

Swedish Eurodance group

- Origin: Sweden
- Genres: Electronic, Euro House
- Years active: 1993—1996
- Past members: Chris Ljung; Malvern Mandengu; Kajsa Mellgren; Silver

Flexx is a Swedish Eurodance group, formed in 1993 by Swedish rappers Chris Ljung and Malvern Mandengu. Same year, Ljung and Mandengu released their debut single, "Wake Up", which became a number four hit in Sweden and it also peaked at number 48 on the Eurochart Hot 100. The producers were Jan Nordlund and Johan Lagerlöf. The vocalist attracted Nana Hedin (known for the female vocal parts of E-Type). In 1994, they released 3 singles: "Flexxible", "The Good, The Bad And The Ugly" and "Runner-Up". In the same year, an album Flexxibility was released. In most of the compositions, female vocals belong to Kajsa Mellgren. Kajsa left the Flexx team in 1995. Instead, they took the performer Silver. Flexx was planning a new album Generation XX, but it never appeared.

== Discography ==
=== Album ===
- Flexxibility (1994, Stockholm Records) — 36 in Sweden album chart (week 23, 1994)

=== Singles ===
The group had 6 singles in Swedish national music chart:

- "Wake Up" (1993) — best position 4 (week 6, 1994)
- "Flexxible" (1994) — best position 11 (week 18, 1994)
- "The Good, The Bad And The Ugly" (1994) — best position 17 (week 18, 1994)
- "Runner-Up" (1994) — best position 38 (week 48, 1994)
- "Spider" (1995)
- "Shake U All" (1996)
