= Loud Pipes Save Lives =

Studio album by E-Type
- Released: 25 March 2004
- Genre: Eurodance, pop, electronic, Hi-NRG
- Length: 38:00
- Label: Stockholm Records
- Producer: Max Martin, Rami Yacoub, John Amatiello, Christian Nilsson, Jonas von der Burg, Peter Boström, Patrik Henzel, Daniel Papalexis

E-Type chronology
| Euro IV Ever (2001) | Loud Pipes Save Lives (2004) | Eurotopia (2007) |

Loud Pipes Save Lives is the fifth studio album by Swedish singer-songwriter E-Type, which was released in 2004. It is the last E-Type album to feature vocalist Nana Hedin. E-Type participated with "Paradise" in Melodifestivalen 2004, ending up at 5th place. "Paradise" was the first single released to European audiences and became a hit.

The album features a guest appearance by death metal vocalist LG Petrov.

== Track listing ==
| No. | Title | Writer(s) | Producer(s) | Length |
|---|---|---|---|---|
| 1. | "Loud Pipes Save Lives" (The Pipes & Drums of the 1st Royal Engineers) | E-Type | E-Type, Patrik Henzel | 1:41 |
| 2. | "Paradise" (feat. Na Na) | E-Type, Mud | Christian Nilsson, John Amatiello, Max Martin, Rami Yacoub | 3:27 |
| 3. | "Camilla" | E-Type, Mud, Max Martin | Jonas von der Burg | 3:35 |
| 4. | "The Predator" | E-Type, Mud | Peter Boström | 3:17 |
| 5. | "Dans La Fantasie" | E-Type | Peter Boström | 4:12 |
| 6. | "The Original You" | E-Type, Mud | Daniel Papalexis, Patrik Henzel | 3:15 |
| 7. | "Far Up in the Air" (feat. Na Na) | E-Type, Mud | Daniel Papalexis, Patrik Henzel | 3:34 |
| 8. | "Forever More" (feat. Na Na & LG) | E-Type, Mud | Daniel Papalexis, Patrik Henzel | 3:43 |
| 9. | "Rain" | E-Type, Mud | Peter Boström | 4:08 |
| 10. | "If Heaven Were to Fall" | E-Type, Mud | Patrik Henzel | 3:43 |
| 11. | "Lost and Goodbye" | E-Type | Patrik Henzel | 3:50 |

== Sport Edition (Sweden only) ==
1. "Loud Pipes Save Lives"
2. "Olympia"
3. "Campione 2000"
4. "Paradise (feat. Na Na)"
5. "The Predator"
6. "Dans La Fantasie"
7. "The Original You"
8. "Far Up in the Air (feat. Na Na)"
9. "Forever More (feat. Na Na & LG)"
10. "Rain"
11. "If Heaven Were to Fall"
12. "Lost and Goodbye"

== Chart positions ==
| Chart (2004) | Peak position |
|---|---|
| Finnish Albums (Suomen virallinen lista) | 13 |
| Norwegian Albums (VG-lista) | 17 |
| Swedish Albums (Sverigetopplistan) | 2 |
