= Angels Crying =

1998 single by E-Type

Single by E-Type

from the album Last Man Standing
- Released: 1998
- Genre: Eurodance
- Length: 3:51
- Label: Stockholm
- Songwriters: E-Type; Mud
- Producers: Kristian Lundin; Max Martin; E-Type

E-Type singles chronology
"I Just Wanna Be with You" (1997)	"Angels Crying" (1998)	"Here I Go Again" (1998)

Music video
- "Angels Crying" on YouTube

"Angels Crying" is a song by Swedish musician Bo Martin Erik Erikson, known under the pseudonym of E-Type, released in 1998 by Stockholm Records as the first single from the musician's third album, Last Man Standing (1998). The song was co-written by E-Type, and features vocals by singer Nana Hedin and percussion by Ahmadu Jah. It was a hit in several countries, peaking at number two in Denmark, Finland, Norway and Sweden. On the Eurochart Hot 100, the song reached number 44 in August 1998. The accompanying music video for "Angels Crying" is very similar to the 1980 film Friday the 13th.

== Music video ==
=== Synopsis ===
The video starts with a group of Swedish campers exiting out of a brown and white colored station wagon estate vehicle. In the kitchen, a blond haired Swedish guy with a white bucket hat on licking peanut butter from a jar with his finger, which a blonde haired Swedish woman grabs away from him. The blond haired Swedish man with a white bucket hat on gets slightly upset and exits the house, later to be seen stone skipping on a nearby body of water. A brown haired Swedish man with a mustache and goatee walks into the kitchen with groceries in his hands, with one of the two Swedish woman glancing at him after walking pass her from behind. A group of other Swedish people are seen helping a wavy blond haired Swedish man axing wood from a tree. The blond haired Swedish man with a white bucket hat on hears something and walks off into the forest area, where he sees something, presumably a spiritual being, and is frightened. Now at nighttime, the other group of fellow Swedes are inside the red wooden camp building roasting marshmallows from a fire using fire wood they've axed from earlier. A blond haired Swedish man asks the rest of the group to join him for a game of Monopoly, where a couple, consisting of a brown haired Swedish woman seducing a brown haired Swedish man with a moustache and goatee to go to another room for intimate privacy whilst on the lower bunk bed.

The Monopoly game turns out to be a game of strip poker, as a blonde haired Swedish woman is seen losing a round and takes off her blue and white stripped shirt off, exposing her upper cleavage from her white bra and a wavy haired blond haired Swedish man with a red Georgia jersey on is later seen taking his jersey off. The blond haired Swedish man with a white bucket hat is seen on the top bunker of a bunk bed while the brown haired Swedish women and brown haired Swedish man with a moustache and goatee are making out. Another blonde haired Swedish women is seen taking a shower nude and is the second from the group to get frightened by an unknown presence, third a wavy blond haired Swedish man with a red Georgia jersey on while washing his face with water, fourth a brown haired Swedish man while inside an outhouse, and fifth the blonde haired Swedish women with a blue and white stripped shirt. The couple, the brown haired Swedish women and a brown haired Swedish man with a moustache and goatee, are later seen in the kitchen calling on a land line phone, presumingly for help, where they both end up being in a blackout because the mysterious unknown character manages to short circuit the wooden camp building's breaker box, and the scene turns out to be on a production studio set as a staged act, then the hand from the unknown being is seen in direction of the brown haired Swedish man with a moustache and goatee.

== Track listings ==
- CD maxi, Europe
1. "Angels Crying" (radio version) – 3:51
2. "Angels Crying" (C&N radio edit) – 3:34
- CD maxi, Sweden
1. "Angels Crying" (radio version) – 3:51
2. "Angels Crying" (C&N extended) – 6:24
3. "Angels Crying" (C&N radio edit) – 3:34
4. "Angels Crying" (extended version) – 6:35

== Charts ==
=== Weekly charts ===
Chart (1998)	Peak position
Denmark (IFPI)	2
Estonia (Eesti Top 20)	9
Europe (Eurochart Hot 100)	44
Finland (Suomen virallinen lista)	2
Netherlands (Dutch Top 40 Tipparade)	2
Netherlands (Single Top 100)	45
Norway (VG-lista)	2
Sweden (Sverigetopplistan)	2

=== Year-end charts ===
Chart (1998)	Position
Sweden (Topplistan)	11

== Certifications ==
Region	Certification	Certified units/sales
Norway (IFPI Norway)	Platinum	
Sweden (GLF)	Platinum	30,000^{^}
^{^} Shipments figures based on certification alone.
