= The Explorer (album) =

Studio album by E-Type
- Released: 25 October 1996
- Recorded: 1995–1996
- Studio: Cheiron Studios
- Genre: Eurodance, Pop
- Length: 43:32
- Label: Stockholm Records
- Producer: E-Type, Denniz PoP, Max Martin, Kristian Lundin, Per Magnusson, David Kreuger.

E-Type chronology
Made in Sweden (1994)	The Explorer (1996)	Last Man Standing (1998)

Singles from The Explorer
- 1. "Calling Your Name" Released: 1996; 2. "I Just Wanna Be with You" Released: 1997

The Explorer is the second studio album by Swedish singer-songwriter E-Type which was released on 25 October 1996. It contains hit songs "Calling Your Name", "Back in the Loop" and "I Just Wanna Be with You". "Calling Your Name" peaked number 17 on the US Billboard Dance Club Songs Chart.

== Track listing ==
No.	Title	Writer(s)	Note(s)	Length
1.	"The Explorer"	E-Type	Performed by Jan Nygren and "Hallelujah choir" with Berit Kullberg, Johanna Nyström, Björn Klingvall, and Joacim Sandén	1:10
2.	"Calling Your Name"	E-Type, Mud	Chorus vocals by Nana Hedin and Jessica Folcker	3:37
3.	"Back in the Loop"	E-type, Mud	Chorus vocals by Nana Hedin	3:26
4.	"I Just Wanna Be with You"	E-type, Mud	Chorus vocals by Jessica Folcker and Max Martin	3:51
5.	"Free Like a Flying Demon"	E-type	Chorus vocals by Nana Hedin	3:35
6.	"You Know"	E-type	Chorus vocals by Therese Engdahl and Max Martin	3:55
7.	"Forever Wild"	E-type, Mud	Chorus vocals by Nana Hedin	3:41
8.	"Fall From the Sky"	E-type, Mud	Chorus vocals by Jessica Folcker and Max Martin	3:25
9.	"I'm Not Alone"	E-type	Chorus vocals by Nana Hedin, Max Martin and Jeanette Söderholm	4:32
10.	"We Gotta Go"	E-type, Mud	Chorus vocals by Max Martin	3:25
11.	"You Will Always Be a Part of Me"	E-type, Mud	Chorus vocals by Nevada Cato and Andreas Carlsson	4:06
12.	"So Dem A Com" (Explorer Version)	E-type, Mud, Herbie Crichlow and Chilly White	Chorus vocals by Chilly White and Hanna Wanngård	4:49

== Chart ==
Chart (1996)	Peak position
Swedish Albums (Sverigetopplistan)	5
