= Live It Up =

Live It Up may refer to:

== Film and television ==
- Live It Up! (film), a 1963 English music-film
- Live It Up! (TV program), a 1978–1990 Canadian lifestyle program

== Music ==
=== Albums ===
- Live It Up (Crosby, Stills & Nash album) or the title song, 1990
- Live It Up (David Johansen album), 1982
- Live It Up! (Holly Woods album) or the title song, 2007
- Live It Up (Isley Brothers album) or the title song (see below), 1974
- Live It Up! (Johnny Mathis album) or the title song, 1962
- Live It Up (Lee DeWyze album) or the title song, 2010

=== Songs ===
- "Live It Up" (360 song), 2014
- "Live It Up" (Bill Haley song), 1953
- "Live It Up" (Isley Brothers song), 1974
- "Live It Up" (Jennifer Lopez song), 2013
- "Live It Up" (Marshall Dyllon song), 2000
- "Live It Up" (Mental As Anything song), 1985
- "Live It Up" (Nicky Jam song), 2018
- "Live It Up" (Tulisa song), 2012
- "Live It Up" (Yüksek Sadakat song), 2011
- "Live It Up", by Airbourne from Black Dog Barking
- "Live It Up", by Blondie from Autoamerican
- "Live It Up", by Colbie Caillat from Gypsy Heart
- "Live It Up", by Dusty Springfield from Dusty
- "Live It Up", by Group 1 Crew from Outta Space Love
- "Live It Up", by Heinz
- "Live It Up", by J. Williams
- "Live It Up", by Jeannie Ortega from the soundtrack of the film Jump In!
- "Live It Up", by John Legend featuring Miri Ben-Ari from Get Lifted
- "Live It Up", by Juliana Hatfield from Bed
- "Live It Up", by Lloyd Banks from V.6: The Gift
- "Live it Up", by Owl City from The Smurfs 2
- "Live It Up", by REO Speedwagon from The Earth, a Small Man, His Dog and a Chicken
- "Live It Up", by Sheryl Crow from Wildflower
- "Live It Up", by Ted Nugent from Cat Scratch Fever
- "Live It Up", by Time Bandits

== See also ==
- Living It Up (disambiguation)
