= Euro 2000: The Official Album =

Official Euro 2000 Album

Compilation album by Various artists
- Released: 12 June 2000
- Label: Universal Music

Euro 2000: The Official Album is an album with various artists, released on 12 June 2000 as the official music album for UEFA Euro 2000 in Belgium and the Netherlands.

== Track listing ==
Euro 2000: The Official Album
| No. | Title | Writer(s) | Length |
|---|---|---|---|
| 1. | "Campione 2000" | E-Type | 3:32 |
| 2. | "Carnaval 2000 (Rapino Brothers mix)" | Dario G | 3:43 |
| 3. | "Formula Football" | Perfecto FC | 5:10 |
| 4. | "Jerusalem (Pet Shop Boys mix)" | Fat Les 2000 | 3:56 |
| 5. | "Olé Olé Olé Olé (Metaphonic mix)" | Eurostars | 2:55 |
| 6. | "Party Time" | DJ Jean | 3:13 |
| 7. | "Aïda 2000" | DJ Jurgen | 3:22 |
| 8. | "U" | Westbam | 2:59 |
| 9. | "Out There and Back" | Paul van Dyk | 4:26 |
| 10. | "Football Football" | Hampenberg | 3:38 |
| 11. | "Push It to the Limit (DJ Jurgen radio mix)" | Nagano All Stars | 3:34 |
| 12. | "Euro Chant 2K" | Shaft | 3:10 |
| 13. | "F.O.O.T.B.A.L.L." | T-Spoon | 2:56 |
| 14. | "Great Escape 2000 (Dirty Rotten Scoundrels mix)" | England Supporters Band | 3:37 |
| 15. | "Agustito (Euro 2000 mix)" | Ketama | 3:33 |
| 16. | "Ready to Go (Album version)" | Republica | 4:59 |
| 17. | "La Gente Vuole II Gol (Rapino Brothers mix)" | Elio e le Storie Tese | 3:15 |
| 18. | "Number One (Euro 2000 mix)" | Di-Mico | 2:56 |
| 19. | "Football Is The Game" | U96 | 3:30 |
| 20. | "Jerusalem" | Fat Les 2000 | 2:27 |
| 21. | "Campione 2000 (MCM mix)" | CF Fonotron | 2:49 |
| 22. | "In Ancient Times (hidden track)" | Necunoscut | Unknown |

=== Charts ===
| Chart (2000) | Peak position |
|---|---|
| German Albums (Offizielle Top 100) | 63 |
