= Vive O 2004! =

Compilation album by Various artists
- Released: June 14, 2004
- Genres: Rock, pop
- Label: Universal Music

The Vive O 2004! is an album with various artists, released on June 14, 2004 as the official music album for UEFA Euro 2004 in Portugal.

== Track listing ==
1. "All Together Now" – The Farm
2. "Beautiful Day" – U2
3. "You're So Pretty" – Charlatans
4. "That's Entertainment" – The Jam
5. "Supersonic" – Oasis
6. "Riverboat Song" – Ocean Colour Scene
7. "Welcome To The Cheap Seats" – The Wonderstuff
8. "Staying Out For The Summer" – Dodgy
9. "Love Spreads" – The Stone Roses
10. "England's Irie" – Black Grape
11. "Born In England" – Twisted X
12. "Hate to Say I Told You So" – The Hives
13. "You Get What You Give" – New Radicals
14. "Going For Gold" – Shed Seven
15. "Eat My Goal" – Collapsed Lung
16. "Força" – Nelly Furtado
17. "My Favourite Game" – The Cardigans
18. "You and Me Song – The Wannadies
19. "Walk Away" – Cast

=== Charts ===
Chart (2004)	Peak position
German Compilation Albums (Offizielle Top 100)	26
