= Sony Magazine =

- Editor: Tim Southwell
- Categories: Gadgets, Technology, and lifestyle
- Frequency: Quarterly
- First issue: 2008
- Company: Haymarket Network
- Country: United Kingdom
- Language: English
- Website: www.sonymagazine.co.uk

Sony Magazine is a quarterly magazine published by Haymarket Network on behalf of Sony Corporation UK, with articles on film, music, games, television, sound, vision, gadgets, and adventure. It was founded in 2007 by Tim Southwell, the former co-founder of Loaded.
