= Campione 2000 =

2000 song by E-Type

Single by E-Type

from the album Euro IV Ever
- Released: 19 June 2000
- Length: 3:34
- Label: Stockholm
- Songwriters: E-Type, Rick Blaskey, Kent Brainerd
- Producers: Kent Brainerd, E-Type, Johan Amatiello

E-Type singles chronology
"Es Ist Nie Vorbei" (2000)	"Campione 2000" (2000)	"Life" (2001)

"Campione 2000" is the official song of the UEFA Euro 2000 held in the Netherlands and Belgium. It was performed by Swedish musician E-Type and written by E-Type, Rick Blaskey and Kent Brainerd. It gained a huge popularity during the tournament and has since been heard in football games around Europe, both in national and international games. It translates as "Champion" in English.

The chorus of the song resembles the chorus of a Dutch popular song "Oranje Boven", which insist the link between Netherlands with the Royal Dutch Family and a national chant honoring the red-white-blue tricolor Dutch national flag.

The song was included on E-Type's album Euro IV Ever (2001), and on the Sport Edition of Loud Pipes Save Lives (2004). It was also included on The Official Euro 2000 Album.

== Track listing ==
CD maxi – Europe (2000)

1. "Campione 2000" (radio version) – 3:34
2. "Campione 2000" (The Only Earthbound remix) – 6:39
3. "Campione 2000" (Pinocchio remix) – 4:53
4. "Campione 2000" (CF Fonotron mix) – 2:50

== Charts ==
=== Weekly charts ===
Weekly chart performance for "Campione 2000"
Chart (2000)	Peak position
Belgium (Ultratop 50 Flanders)	40
Belgium (Ultratip Bubbling Under Wallonia)	10
France (SNEP)	66
Germany (GfK)	91
Netherlands (Dutch Top 40)	4
Netherlands (Single Top 100)	3
Norway (VG-lista)	9
Scotland Singles (OCC)	59
Sweden (Sverigetopplistan)	2
Switzerland (Schweizer Hitparade)	61
UK Singles (OCC)	58

=== Year-end charts ===
Annual chart rankings for "Campione 2000"
Chart (2000)	Position
European Airplay (Border Breakers)	90
Netherlands (Dutch Top 40)	111
Netherlands (Single Top 100)	73
Sweden (Hitlistan)	16

== Certifications ==
Certifications and sales for "Campione 2000"
Region	Certification	Certified units/sales
Sweden (GLF)	Platinum	30,000^{^}
^{^} Shipments figures based on certification alone.
