= Downloading Nancy =

- Promotional film poster
- Directed by: Johan Renck
- Written by: Pamela Cuming; Lee Ross
- Produced by: Jason Essex; Cole Payne; Igor Kovacevich; David Moore
- Starring: Maria Bello; Jason Patric; Rufus Sewell; Amy Brenneman
- Cinematography: Christopher Doyle
- Edited by: Johan Söderberg
- Music by: Krister Linder
- Release date: January 21, 2008 (Sundance Film Festival)
- Running time: 102 minutes
- Country: United States
- Language: English
- Box office: $20,000

Downloading Nancy is a 2008 drama film directed by Johan Renck, starring Maria Bello and Jason Patric. It is loosely based on the death of Sharon Lopatka, who sought out someone who would torture her to death. The film premiered at the 2008 Sundance Film Festival, where it was nominated for a Grand Jury Prize.

== Plot ==
From the press release:

Dead to everything except painful pleasure, an unhappily married woman, Nancy, leaves her silent husband behind to meet a fellow broken soul in search of a final release. Louis is a quiet dispenser of pleasure, Nancy is the mechanism set to self-destruct. Beyond therapy, beyond medication, beyond feeling, Nancy is left with the only coping mechanism she ever knew, violence. Together, they journey through the darkest recesses of the human mind before finding solace in each other's arms. For Nancy, solace can only come from death, for Louis, it can only come from Nancy. Nancy's husband Albert is left with an empty house, filled with only the memory of his wife's unbearable loneliness and a final, endless understanding of how bleak life could be. The relationship between Louis and Nancy straddles the thin line between pleasure and pain, crossing over into a film that is as emotional as it is unnerving.

== Cast ==
- Maria Bello as Nancy Stockwell
- Jason Patric as Louis Farley
- Rufus Sewell as Albert Stockwell, Nancy's husband
- Michael Nyqvist as Stan
- Amy Brenneman as Carol, Nancy's psychotherapist

== Reception ==
The film received mostly negative reviews, evident from a score of 18% on Rotten Tomatoes, based on 33 reviews with an average rating of 3.8/10. Its critics consensus reads: "Unseemly, unsettling, and unremittingly bleak, Downloading Nancy is slickly made but mostly unpleasant." On Metacritic, the film has a rank of 19 out of a 100 based on 11 critics, indicating "overwhelming dislike".

Variety called the film a "forbidding and morbid piece of psycho-sadomasochism" with a "swimming-in-the-deep-end performance by Maria Bello that is the definition of fearless". It also notes:

Performances are cranked up to red-line neurotic levels, while production values intently contribute to creating an artificially bleak world where it's understandable scarcely anyone would want to spend time, even for the duration of this movie.

Salon.com, in a report about the films at the 2008 Sundance Film Festival, wrote:

One film that will not be acquired by anybody at Sundance – I'll just crawl out on a limb with this one – is Downloading Nancy ... Bello's skin-peeling, ultra-depresso performance is wrenching and brave, calling for both emotional and physical nakedness. Can a film with those attributes also be insulting garbage? It's a difficult aesthetic-philosophical conundrum, but having sat through this damn thing I now have an answer.

"I just had the experience of being there at the screening at Sundance and watching the door flap open and closed," said Rufus Sewell, who plays Nancy's husband Albert in the film. "I didn't expect so many people to walk out at Sundance." Despite the controversy, Sewell continues to staunchly support the film. "I was delighted. ...[I]t's a film I'm very proud of, whether you consider that it fails or succeeds, whether you like it or don't like it. I'm proud to be in it."

Kirk Honeycutt of The Hollywood Reporter called it the "ugliest film ever shot by that remarkable cameraman Christopher Doyle".

According to Manohla Dargis of The New York Times, the film is "A nasty exploitation flick tarted up with art-house actors and psychobabble".
