= Set the World on Fire (E-Type song) =

Single by E-Type

from the album Made in Sweden
- Released: 1994
- Studio: Cheiron (Stockholm, Sweden)
- Genre: Eurodance
- Length: 3:28
- Label: Sotckholm
- Songwriters: E-Type; Mud
- Producer: Denniz Pop

E-Type singles chronology
"I'm Falling" (1993)	"Set the World on Fire" (1994)	"This Is the Way" (1994)

Music video
- "Set the World on Fire" on YouTube

"Set the World on Fire" is a song recorded by Swedish musician known as E-Type. It features vocals by singer Nana Hedin and was released by Stockholm Records as the first single from E-Type's debut album, Made in Sweden (1994). The song was co-written by him with Mud and produced by Denniz Pop. It was released in 1994 and also appeared twice on Made in Sweden: as the original studio version and as an acoustic version.

"Set the World on Fire" became a hit in several countries, particularly in Sweden, where it reached number two on the Topplistan chart for two weeks, ending up as the 22nd-most-sold single in Sweden in 1994 and receiving a gold certification. In 1996, "Set the World on Fire" charted in the United States, peaking at number 22 on the Billboard Dance Club Play chart and remaining on the chart for 11 weeks. Two different music videos were produced to promote the single and both feature Hedin. It was A-listed on Dutch music television channel TMF in August 1995. Robbert Tilli from Music & Media described "Set the World on Fire" as "vintage Euro dance, with a slightly harder edge to it." It was nominated in the category for Best Swedish Dance Track 1994 at the 1995 Swedish Dance Music Awards.

== Track listings ==
- CD maxi 1
1. "Set the World on Fire (7-inch version) — 3:43
2. "Set the World on Fire (Amadin Boeing remix) — 7:47
3. "Set the World on Fire (extended version) — 8:03
4. "Set the World on Fire (E-Type's Tyroler mix) — 3:47
- CD maxi 2
1. "Set the World on Fire" (single version) — 3:28
2. "Set the World on Fire" (extended pop) — 6:12
3. "Set the World on Fire" (Yetin and Max mix) — 5:37
4. "Set the World on Fire" (Amadin Boeing remix) — 7:47

== Charts ==
=== Weekly charts ===
Chart (1994–1996)	Peak position
Europe (Eurochart Hot 100)	50
Finland (Suomen virallinen lista)	17
France (SNEP)	13
Israel (Israeli Singles Chart)	6
Netherlands (Dutch Top 40 Tipparade)	2
Netherlands (Single Top 100)	48
Sweden (Sverigetopplistan)	2
US Dance Club Play (Billboard)	22

=== Year-end charts ===
Chart (1994)	Position
Sweden (Topplistan)	22

== Certifications ==
Region	Certification	Certified units/sales
Sweden (GLF)	Gold	25,000^{^}
^{^} Shipments figures based on certification alone.
