= Eurotopia =

Studio album by E-Type
- Released: 31 October 2007
- Genre: Eurodance, pop
- Label: Lulubelle Records/Universal Music
- Producer: Max Martin

E-Type chronology
Loud Pipes Save Lives (2004)	Eurotopia (2007)

Eurotopia is the sixth and currently last studio album by Swedish singer-songwriter E-Type, which was released on 31 October 2007. It contains the hit songs "True Believer" and "Eurofighter".

The album is dominated by the vocals of Sanne Karlsson, the newest addition to the band. Album reached 10th peak place in Swedish albums charts, but soon fell off the charts becoming E-Type's least successful album. In Finland it flopped, despite the lead-off single "True Believer" smashing Finnish singles Chart reaching # 3. It was a # 1 hit in Sweden.

== Track listing ==
No.	Title	Writer(s)	Note(s)	Length
1.	"True Believer"	E-type, Savan Kotecha	chorus vocals by Sanne Karlsson	3:40
2.	"The Tide"	E-type	chorus vocals by Sanne Karlsson	3:57
3.	"Eurofighter"	E-type, Anna Nordell	chorus vocals by Sanne Karlsson	3:47
4.	"Make Us High"	E-type, Anna Nordell	chorus vocals by Sanne Karlsson	4:09
5.	"Like a Child"	E-type	chorus vocals by Sanne Karlsson	4:17
6.	"Last Day Alive"	E-type, Anna Nordell	chorus vocals by Sanne Karlsson	4:01
7.	"To the Lions"	E-type, Anna Nordell	chorus vocals by Sanne Karlsson	3:42
8.	"Ding Ding Song"	E-type, Anna Nordell	chorus vocals by Anna Nordell	3:34
9.	"Inside"	E-type, Sarah Dawn Finer	chorus vocals by Sarah Dawn Finer	4:52

== Chart positions ==
Chart (2007)	Peak position
Swedish Albums (Sverigetopplistan)	10
