= True Believer (song) =

Single by E-Type

from the album Eurotopia
- Language: Swedish
- Released: 2007
- Label: Universal Music
- Songwriter(s): E-Type, Savan Kotecha
- Producer(s): Max Martin, Jonas Månsson, Robin Söderman

"True Believer" is a song written by E-Type and Savan Kotecha, and recorded by E-Type on the album Eurotopia. It was originally played over radio on 11 May 2007 at the RIX Morronzoo programme. As a newcomer it directly entered 5th position at Trackslistan at Sveriges Radio P3. On 24 May 2007 it entered the first position at the Swedish singles chart, a position it held for one week. In Finland, it peaked at No. 3 in the Finnish singles chart

On 10 June 2007, it received a Svensktoppen test, but failed to enter chart.

In August 2007, it was certified gold in Sweden.

== Chart positions ==
Chart (2007)	Peak position
Finland (Finland)	3
Sweden (Sverigetopplistan)	1
