= Tim Southwell =

British magazine publisher

Tim Southwell is a writer, broadcaster and author. He was co-founder of loaded magazine, launched in April 1994.

== Biography ==
Along with James Brown and Mick Bunnage, Southwell helped create the men's magazine phenomenon of the 1990s. Previously to loaded, Southwell founded Zine Magazine (along with ex NME writer Iestyn George), a forerunner to loaded in terms of its empathetic style and homage to gonzo journalism. He then worked for Record Mirror, Smash Hits, iD and NME before teaming up with Brown to create loaded.

In 2003, Southwell set up his own publishing company, Keep Yourself Nice Ltd, launching Golf Punk, 'The Golf Mag For The Rest Of Us' in 2004. Tim was named Editor Of The Year at the 2006 BSME (British Society Of Magazine Editors) for Golf Punk, and also IPA (Independent Publishers Association) Editor Of The Year that same year.

In 2007 he set up Mind How You Go Media Ltd, producing Sony Magazine (sub-contracted by Haymarket Network) for the electronics giant, and launched www.showmethegolf.com. Show Me The Golf TV was launched on Setanta's Golf Channel as a half hour weekly studio show in January 2009.

In July 2011, Mind How You Go Media Ltd started supplying premium content to GolfPunk's publishers in China, Singapore, Germany and Czech Republic. Later the same year the company attained the IP for GolfPunk in the UK.

In 2012 the company was commissioned by renowned UK publishing giants D C Thompson to help relaunch The Beano as it celebrated its 75th year.

August 2012 saw the relaunch of GolfPunk as a digital only magazine. The magazine has quickly re-established itself, and now features a host of rich media to complement the traditional magazine content. A unique readership of 43,000 was recorded for issue one and the magazine was shortlisted for Launch and Sports Magazine of The Year at the 2012 Digital Magazine Awards, despite only one issue being eligible for consideration.
