= I Just Wanna Be with You =

1997 single by E-Type

Single by E-Type

from the album The Explorer
- Released: 1997
- Length: 3:52
- Label: Stockholm
- Songwriters: E-Type; Mud
- Producers: E-Type; Kristian Lundin

E-Type singles chronology
"Back in the Loop" (1997)	"I Just Wanna Be with You" (1997)	"You Will Always Be a Part of Me" (1997)

Music video
- "I Just Wanna Be with You" on YouTube

"I Just Wanna Be with You" is a song by Swedish musician Bo Martin Erik Erikson, known under the pseudonym of E-Type featuring backing vocals by Swedish singer Jessica Folcker, who doesn't appear in the accompanying music video. Produced by him with Kristian Lundin, the song was released in 1997 by Stockholm Records as the fourth single from the musician's second album, The Explorer (1996). "I Just Wanna Be with You" was a hit in several countries, peaking at number two in Estonia, number 10 in Sweden and number 15 in Finland. It ended up as number 69 on the Swedish year-end chart.

== Critical reception ==
In Music & Media's review of the album, The Explorer, "I Just Wanna Be with You" was described as a "single candidate […] with Ace of Base-beats".

== Track listings ==
- 12-inch single, Europe
1. "I Just Wanna Be with You" (Andre's Boogie Buster Long Mix) — 5:25
2. "I Just Wanna Be with You" (Andre's Summer Mix) — 5:36
3. "I Just Wanna Be with You" (Rico & Bear Xplorer Club Mix) — 6:24
4. "I Just Wanna Be with You" (Single Version) — 3:50
- CD single, Sweden
1. "I Just Wanna Be with You" (Single Version) — 3:52
2. "I Just Wanna Be with You" (Andre's Boogie Buster Short Mix) — 5:26
- CD maxi, Europe
1. "I Just Wanna Be with You" (Single Version) — 3:52
2. "I Just Wanna Be with You" (Andre's Boogie Buster Long Mix) — 5:26
3. "I Just Wanna Be with You" (Andre's Summer Mix) — 5:37
4. "I Just Wanna Be with You" (Rico & Bear Xplorer Club Mix) — 6:25

== Charts ==
=== Weekly charts ===
Chart (1997)	Peak position
Estonia (Eesti Top 20)	2
Finland (Suomen virallinen lista)	15
Latvia (Latvijas Top 50)	16
Sweden (Sverigetopplistan)	10

=== Year-end charts ===
Chart (1997)	Position
Latvia (Latvijas Top 50)	187
Romania (Romanian Top 100)	18
Sweden (Topplistan)	69
