= Johan Renck =

Swedish director (born 1966)

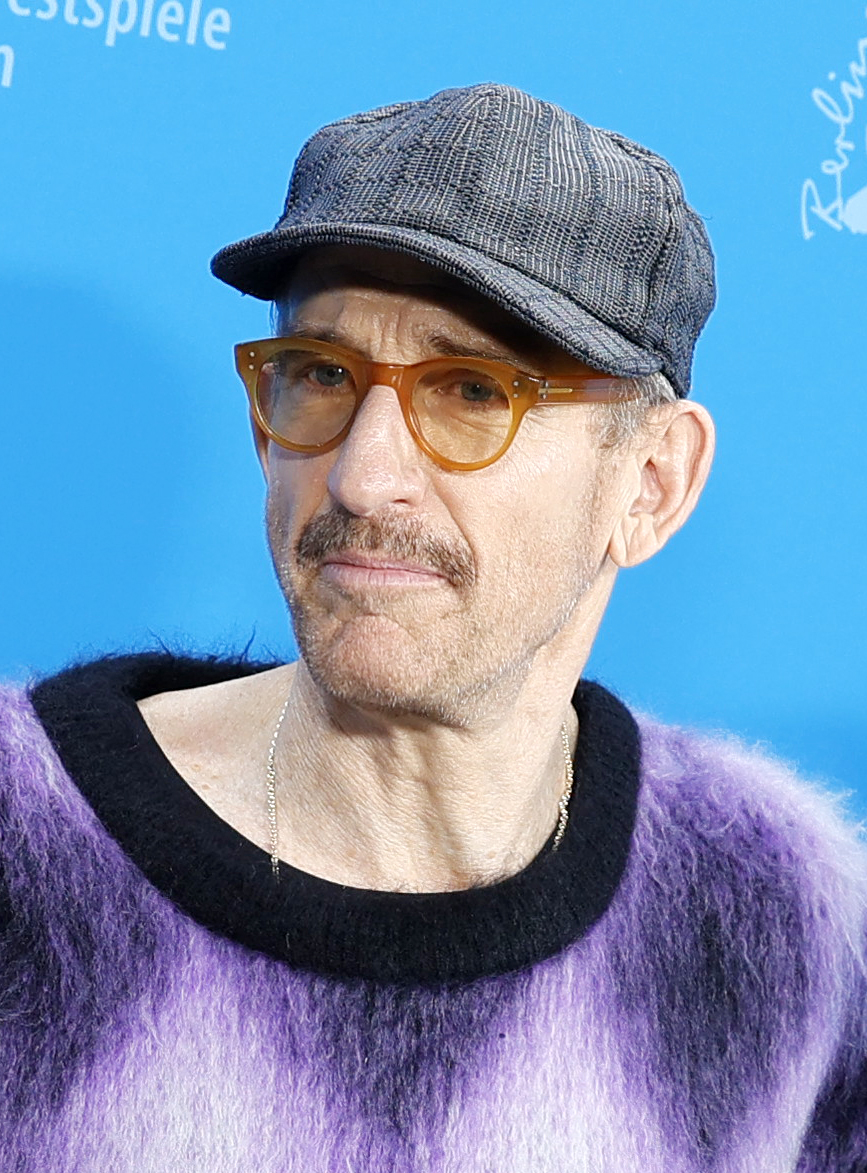
- Renck in 2024
- Born: 5 December 1966 (age 59); Uppsala, Sweden
- Other name: Stakka Bo
- Education: Stockholm School of Economics
- Occupations: Film director, music video director, former singer-songwriter
- Years active: 1991–present
- Spouse: Elin Renck (m. 2013)

Signature
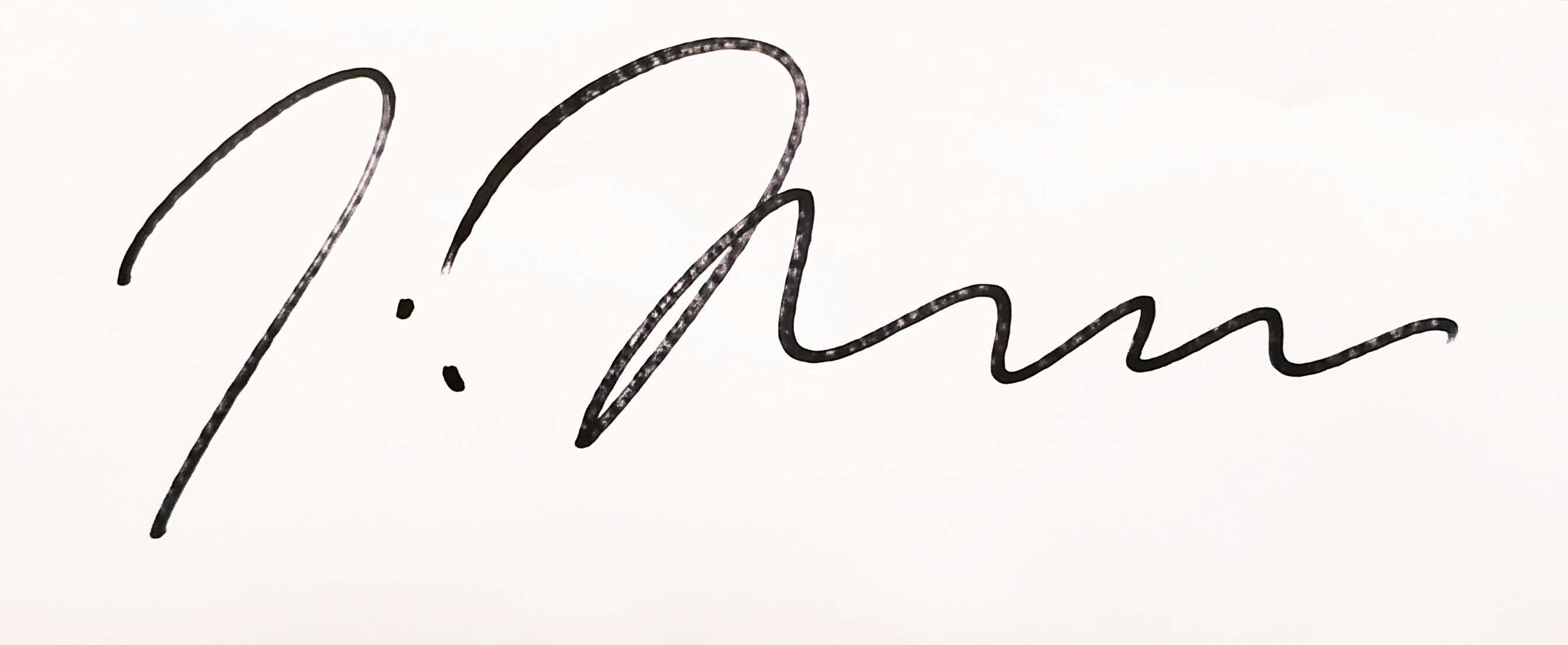

Bo Johan Renck (born 5 December 1966) is a Swedish director of music videos, TV and film. He was originally a singer-songwriter from 1991 to 2001, using the moniker Stakka Bo, and had an international hit with his single "Here We Go" in 1993. Renck later became a music-video and television director, winning an Emmy Award in 2019 for his work on the mini-series Chernobyl.

== Early life ==
Renck was born on 5 December 1966 in Uppsala, Sweden, the son of medical doctor and professor Hans Renck and nurse Marina Kylberg. Hans taught at several universities around the world, so the Renck family moved around and lived in Miami, Uppsala, Malmö, Tromsø and Kuwait. He graduated from Stockholm School of Economics with a degree in business.

== Career ==
=== Music ===
While at university, he dated singer and ex-model Camilla Henemark of Army of Lovers, who introduced him to the Swedish music business. He started out as one half of Eurodance duo E-Type + Stakka B, but went solo after two singles, continuing to release music as Stakka Bo.

Stakka Bo had a hit single in 1993 with the song "Here We Go", which peaked at No. 13 in the UK Singles Chart. Heavily influenced by the Stereo MCs, who were popular at the time, "Here We Go" appeared in an episode of the animated television series Beavis and Butt-Head and sitcom Derry Girls, in the films Prêt-à-porter, Never Been Kissed and Alien Autopsy and in the video game UEFA Euro 2004.

Due to a very tight budget, he ended up directing the first video for his solo project, and continued making his own videos, eventually directing videos of other Swedish artists such as Titiyo and The Cardigans.

=== Music videos ===
He has directed music videos for a number of artists including Madonna's "Nothing Really Matters" and "Hung Up", Kylie Minogue's "Love at First Sight", All Saints' "Black Coffee", Robyn's "Handle Me", Robbie Williams's "Tripping" and "She's Madonna", The Libertines' "What Became of the Likely Lads", Suede's "She's in Fashion", New Order's "Crystal" and "Krafty", Beyoncé's "Me, Myself and I", Chris Cornell's "Can't Change Me", The Knife's "Pass This On", Fever Ray's "Seven" and Bat for Lashes' "Daniel". In 2012 he directed the music video "Blue Velvet" for Lana Del Rey which was also used for the commercial campaign by H&M, as well as the music video for "Wild" by Beach House. In 2015 he directed the ten-minute video for David Bowie's "Blackstar", and "Lazarus" that appeared in January 2016. In 2005, he and his brother Martin directed two videos from Swedish band The Cardigans: "I Need Some Fine Wine and You, You Need to Be Nicer" and "Don't Blame Your Daughter (Diamonds)". He has been associated with Swedish artists like Karin Dreijer and Kent.

=== Film and television ===
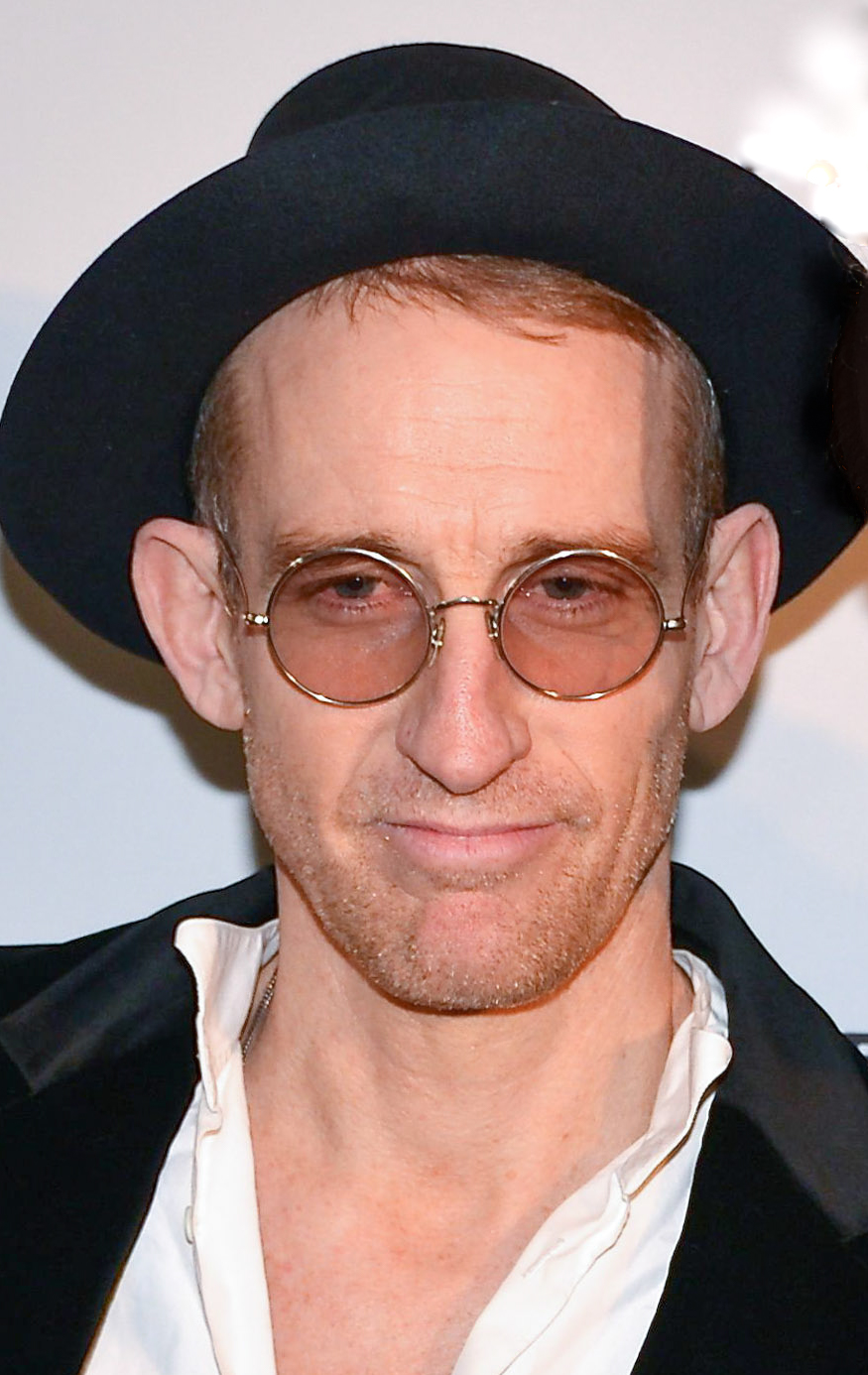
Renck in 2013

Renck's first film, Downloading Nancy, 2008 premiered at the Sundance Film Festival on 21 January 2008 in Park City, Utah. While the movie didn't receive very strong reviews, it generated a call from Breaking Bad creator Vince Gilligan. He directed three episodes of AMC television drama Breaking Bad, and moved on to work on one episode of The Walking Dead, Halt and Catch Fire, and Bates Motel.

In addition, Renck directed a fashion art film called Decadent Control for Imagine Fashion that premiered in March 2011. It starred Roberto Cavalli, Eva Herzigová, Kirsty Hume and Brad Kroenig and used fashion from Agent Provocateur and H&M.

He told Swedish magazine Cafe in 2017 that for a while he preferred to direct pilots (Vikings, Bloodline), but now rather works on mini-series, where one can direct all episodes, such as with The Last Panthers. He says he turned down Better Call Saul, Game of Thrones and Homeland. He told the magazine: "And as the director of a TV-episode, you only have around 25 percent of input. There are two kinds of TV projects that I still agree to do, one is television series where each episode is a separate "entity", like Black Mirror, and the other is miniseries where you can do all the episodes, as I did with The Last Panthers. But of course I am very happy that Breaking Bad happened, it was very educational and exciting and fresh. Plus, it is hugely prestigious – people still call me because of it."

In 2019, Renck directed the mini-series Chernobyl, a dramatization of the 1986 Chernobyl disaster, for SKY and HBO, featuring among others Stellan Skarsgård, Jared Harris and Emily Watson. Renck won the Primetime Emmy Award for Outstanding Directing for a Limited Series, Movie, or Dramatic Special in 2019 for his work on Chernobyl. In January 2020, Renck won the Directors Guild of America Award for Movies for Television and Limited Series.

In the fall of 2019, it was announced that he was attached to the feature film Spaceman of Bohemia an adaptation to the book by U.S. based, Czech born writer Jaroslav Kalfař, with a screenplay written by Colby Day. The film is set up under Channing Tatum's company, Free Association.

In May 2020, Variety reported he was in negotiations to direct and executive produce the limited series Girl A for producer Elizabeth Gabler (former president of Fox 2000) and Sony Pictures Entertainment. The series is adapted from the novel by debut author Abigail Dean.

In June 2020, Renck was revealed as executive producer and director of the pilot episode of HBO's television adaptation of The Last of Us with Chernobyl collaborator Craig Mazin; in January 2021, he was forced to drop out of the project due to scheduling conflicts, replaced as the pilot's director by Kantemir Balagov.

In January 2021, he was announced to be directing the science fiction series The Sparrow, based on the novel of the same name by Mary Doria Russell and written by Scott Frank.

In September 2022, he and his producing partner Michael Parets founder their own production company, Sinestra, and signed a 2-year first look deal with Freemantle. Under this deal he will direct an adaptation of the novel Mouth to Mouth.

Renck was set to direct the pilot episode to Dune: Prophecy. But on 28 February 2023, it was announced that he left the project due to a creative overhaul.

In March 2023, he signed to direct a film adaptation of The Prisoner in His Palace, a novel based on the 12 soldiers who guarded Saddam Hussein in the months previous to his execution. He also signed to direct a TV adaptation of the novel The Day of the Triffids for Amazon Studios.

In April 2024. he was announced to be directing the TV series Caledonian Road, written by Will Smith based on the novel of the same name by Andrew O'Hagan.

In February 2025, Renck was announced to be directing A Ladder To The Sky, based on the novel of the same name by John Boyne and written by Andres Heinz, Mickey Down and Konrad Kay.

In December 2025, Renck was announced to be directing the upcoming Netflix live-action adaptation of the Assassin's Creed video game series.

== Personal life ==
He is married to Elin Renck and has four children.

== Videography ==
- "Here We Go" – Stakka Bo
- "Nothing Really Matters" – Madonna
- "Hung Up" – Madonna
- "Love at First Sight" – Kylie Minogue
- "Black Coffee" – All Saints
- "Handle Me" – Robyn
- "Tripping" – Robbie Williams
- "She's Madonna" – Robbie Williams
- "What Became of the Likely Lads" – The Libertines
- "She's in Fashion" – Suede
- "Crystal" – New Order
- "Krafty" – New Order
- "Me, Myself and I" – Beyoncé
- "Can't Change Me" – Chris Cornell
- "Pass This On" – The Knife
- "Seven" – Fever Ray
- "Daniel" – Bat for Lashes
- "Blue Velvet" – Lana Del Rey
- "Wild" – Beach House
- "Blackstar" – David Bowie
- "Lazarus" – David Bowie
- "I Need Some Fine Wine and You, You Need to Be Nicer" (with Martin Renck) – The Cardigans
- "Don't Blame Your Daughter (Diamonds)" (with Martin Renck) – The Cardigans

== Discography ==
=== Studio albums ===
Title	Album details	Peak chart positions			
Title	Album details	SWE	FIN	SWI	UK
Supermarket	Released: 1993; Label: Stockholm (521089); Formats: LP, CS, CD	9	35	29	—
The Great Blondino	Released: 1995; Label: Stockholm (529336); Formats: LP, CS, CD	19	—	—	192
Jr.	Released: 2001; Label: Stockholm (014162); Formats: CS, CD	23	—	—	—
"—" denotes items that did not chart or were not released in that territory.

=== Singles ===
Year	Title	Peak chart positions										Album
Year	Title	SWE	AUT	DEN	EUR	FIN	GER	NED	NOR	SWI	UK	Album
1991	"We Got the Atmosphere" (with E-Type)	—	—	—	—	—	—	—	—	—	—	Non-album singles
1992	"Numania 1" (with E-Type)	—	—	—	—	—	—	—	—	—	—	Non-album singles
1993	"Here We Go"	4	6	10	17	—	15	23	10	7	13	Supermarket
1993	"Down the Drain"	24	27	—	83	10	—	—	—	22	64	Supermarket
1993	"Living It Up"	38	—	—	—	—	—	—	—	—	—	Supermarket
1994	"On Your Knees"	—	—	—	—	—	—	—	—	—	—	Supermarket
1994	"We"	—	—	—	—	—	—	—	—	—	—	Supermarket
1995	"Great Blondino"	15	—	—	—	—	—	—	—	—	—	The Great Blondino
1996	"Softroom"	54	—	—	—	—	—	—	—	—	—	The Great Blondino
1996	"We Vie" (with Titiyo, Fleshquartet & Nåid)	10	—	—	—	—	—	—	—	—	—	Jr.
2001	"Mute"	20	—	—	—	—	—	—	—	—	—	Jr.
2001	"Killer"	34	—	—	—	—	—	—	—	—	—	Jr.
2001	"Love of a Woman"	—	—	—	—	—	—	—	—	—	—	Jr.
"—" denotes items that did not chart or were not released in that territory.

== Filmography ==
=== Film ===
Year	Title	Director	Executive Producer
2008	Downloading Nancy	Yes	No
2024	Spaceman	Yes	Yes

=== Television ===
TV series

Year	Title	Episode(s)
2009–2011	Breaking Bad	"Breakage"
2009–2011	Breaking Bad	"Más"
2009–2011	Breaking Bad	"Hermanos"
2010	The Walking Dead	"Vatos"
2013	Vikings	"Rites of Passage"
2013	Vikings	"Wrath of the Northmen"
2013	Vikings	"Dispossessed"
2013	Bates Motel	"Trust Me"
2014	Halt and Catch Fire	"Close to the Metal"
2015	Bloodline	"Part 1"
2015	Bloodline	"Part 2"
2016	Shut Eye	"Death"
TBA	Assassin's Creed	

Miniseries

Year	Title	Director	Executive Producer
2014	Ettor & nollor	Yes	No
2015	The Last Panthers	Yes	Yes
2019	Chernobyl	Yes	Yes

== Awards and nominations ==
Year	Award	Category	Title	Result
1999	MTV Video Music Awards	Best Special Effects in a Video	Nothing Really Matters	Nominated
2008	Stockholm International Film Festival	Bronze Horse Award	Downloading Nancy	Nominated
2008	Sundance Film Festival	Grand Jury Prize: Dramatic	Downloading Nancy	Nominated
2011	Online Film & Television Association	Best Direction in a Drama Series	The Walking Dead	Nominated
2016	British Academy Television Awards	Best Drama Series	The Last Panthers	Nominated
2016	Camerimage	Best Music Video	Blackstar	Nominated
2016	MTV Video Music Awards	Best Direction	Lazarus	Nominated
2019	Primetime Emmy Award	Outstanding Directing for a Limited Series	Chernobyl	Won
2020	British Academy Television Craft Awards	Best Director: Fiction	Chernobyl	Won
2020	CinEuphoria Awards	Merit - Honorary Award	Chernobyl	Won
2020	Producers Guild of America Award	Best Limited Series Television	Chernobyl	Won
2020	Directors Guild of America Award	Outstanding Directing – Miniseries or TV Film	Chernobyl	Won
