= Collapsed Lung (band) =

English Britpop group

- Origin: Harlow, Essex, England, United Kingdom
- Genres: Britpop, rap rock, hip-hop, grebo, alternative hip-hop, alternative rock, alternative dance
- Years active: 1992–1996; 2010; 2014–present
- Label: Deceptive
- Members: Anthony Chapman; Steve Harcourt; Jonny Dawe; Jim Burke; Dave Walsh
- Past members: Nihal Arthanayake; Chris Gutch; Jerry Hawkins

Collapsed Lung are an English, Harlow-based Britpop and rap rock group, best known for the song "Eat My Goal". They formed in February 1992.

== History ==
Collapsed Lung was originally formed as a bedroom studio collaboration between Anthony Chapman and Steve Harcourt. The pair had met at Harlow music venue The Square, and despite coming from contrasting musical backgrounds (Harcourt had previously played guitar in metal band Bomberz, whereas Chapman had previously played bass in pseudo-C86 outfit Pregnant Neck) found they had a shared love of funk and the Amiga tracker software Med/Octamed. Eventually, the duo decided to perform a live show, using an Amiga computer on stage as well as live guitar from Harcourt.

After their debut performance, they were invited to play an all-day music festival in Harlow at which Harcourt first met Nihal Arthanayake, a school friend of Chapman. Nihal was a rapper of Sri Lankan descent who was studying law in Twickenham, Middlesex. He was consequently invited to record some of his raps over the duo's existing tracks. Chapman later took up co-rapping duties alongside Arthanayake, with the line-up completed by bass player Johnny Dawe (previously of Hull band Death By Milkfloat). However, Arthanayake left the band in 1994 after signing a deal for his own group Muddie Funksters with Go! Discs.

Collapsed Lung replaced him with rapper Jim Burke and drummer Chris Gutch. Chapman also bolstered his reputation with DJ work at a variety of London venues. He was keen to reinstate Collapsed Lung's rap credentials, stating "at the end of the day, it's just hip-hop", while promoting the release of 1995's Jackpot Goalie. In late 1995, drummer Chris Gutch left the group to join a band called Rehab. Gutch was replaced by Jerry Hawkins, previously of Atom Seed and the Fuzz.

In 1996, they released their second album Cooler (written as C**ler – the type on the album artwork reflecting the use of stars to denote the refrigeration level of a domestic freezer). In June 1996, a double A-side "London Tonight" / "Eat My Goal" was released which reached number 31 on the UK Singles Chart. "Eat My Goal" was used as the soundtrack to Coca-Cola's "Eat Football, Sleep Football, Drink Coca-Cola" advertising campaign that tied in with the Euro 96 football championships in England.

Despite their success, Collapsed Lung broke up in 1997.

"Eat My Goal" was re-released in May 1998 and reached number 18 on the same chart, and was subsequently used on many TV programmes, most notably SMTV Live in which the song was used for a segment of the same name. It also featured in the video game LMA Manager 2001.

They reformed again in 2014 to support Senser on 26 June at the Dome in London, and have since been playing shows around the UK, including gigs with Jesus Jones.

"Eat My Goal" continues to be used extensively on TV and radio, including as the theme music for Mark Steel's BBC Radio 4 series Mark Steel's in Town since 2009.

== Discography ==
=== Albums ===
Cat No.	Title	Format	Released (dd/mm/yyyy)
BLUFF015	Jackpot Goalie	LP/CD/C	3 April 1995
BLUFF031	Cooler	LP/CD/C	1 July 1996
DEREKS002	Zero Hours Band	LP/DD	28 September 2018
DEREKS003	Collapsed Lung Weekend Television	LP/DD	7 July 2023

=== EPs ===
Cat No.	Title	Format	Released (dd/mm/yyyy)
BLUFF001	"Thundersley Invacar" (EP)	10"/CD	5 July 1993
BLUFF002	"Chainsaw Wedgie" (EP)	12"/CD	20 September 1993

=== Singles ===
Cat No.	Title	Format	Released
BLUFF005	"Down with the Plaid Fad"	12"/CD	3 May 1994
BLUFF009	"DIS Mix"	7"/12"/CD	26 September 1994
BLUFF016	"Interactive"	12"/CD	5 June 1995
BLUFF018	"Connection"	7"	4 December 1995
BLUFF029	"London Tonight" / "Eat My Goal"	12"/CD/C	10 June 1996
BLUFF034	"Board Game"	12"/CD	16 September 1996
BLUFF040	"Ballad Night"	12"	1996
BLUFF060	"Eat My Goal"	CD/C	18 May 1998
DEREKS001	"New Song, Old Band" / "Let's Get Jobs"	7"/DD	28 November 2016

=== Compilations ===
Album Title	Song Title	Released
The Beautiful Game (The Official Album of Euro 96)	"Beat My Goal" (Black Cats Mix)^{1}	1996

== Notes ==
1.A remix of "Eat My Goal", with the word "eat" changed to "beat".
