= David Wilczewski =

American jazz musician

David Wilczewski (June 9, 1952, in Boston – August 22, 2009, in Stockholm) was an American jazz saxophonist.

Wilczewski took up clarinet as a child before switching to saxophone as a teenager. He attended Berklee College of Music from 1968 to 1970 and then the New England Conservatory of Music from 1970 to 1975, and toured and recorded with musicians such as Al Kooper, Harvey Mason, Tavares, and Marvin Gaye. He moved to Los Angeles in 1976 and split his time between there and Boston, playing with Mike Stern, Tim Landers, Dean Brown, and Steve Smith, who together would form the group Vital Information in 1981. He relocated to Stockholm in 1982, playing there with Don Cherry, Vinnie Colaiuta, Bobo Stenson, Herbie Hancock, Nils Landgren, Peter Erskine, the Swedish Radio Jazz Group, Lars Danielsson, Alex Acuña, Eje Thelin, Anders Jormin, Bosse Broberg, Goran Klinghagen, Steve Dobrogosz, and Rolf Jardemark.
