= This Is the Way (E-Type song) =

1994 single by E-Type

Single by E-Type

from the album Made in Sweden
- B-side: "Me No Want Miseria (Take Me to the End)"
- Released: 1994
- Genre: Eurodance
- Length: 3:54
- Label: Stockholm
- Songwriters: E-Type; Mud
- Producers: Denniz Pop; Max Martin

E-Type singles chronology
"Set the World on Fire" (1996)	"This Is the Way" (1994)	"Do You Always (Have To Be Alone)?" (1996)

Music video
- "This Is the Way" on YouTube

"This Is the Way" is a song by Swedish musician Bo Martin Erik Erikson, known under the pseudonym of E-Type. It features vocals by Swedish singer Nana Hedin and was released in 1994 by Stockholm Records as the second single from his debut album, Made in Sweden (1994). The song was co-written by E-Type and produced by Denniz Pop and Max Martin. It reached number-one in Sweden, and also peaked at numbers four and 18 in Denmark and Finland, respectively. In France, it reached number 14 and remained for twenty weeks inside the top 50. On the Eurochart Hot 100, the song peaked at number 40. Outside Europe, it reached number seven in Israel and number 15 on the US Billboard Hot Dance Club Play chart. It earned E-Type the prize for Best Swedish Dance Track 1994 at the 1995 Swedish Dance Music Awards. The accompanying music video, directed by Matt Broadley, also received a nomination in the category for Best Swedish Dance Video 1994 at the same awards.

== Track listings ==
- CD single
1. "This Is the Way" (radio edit) – 3:54
2. "This Is the Way" (waterdreamix) – 6:50
- CD maxi
1. "This Is the Way" (radio edit) – 3:54
2. "This Is the Way" (waterdreamix) – 6:50
3. "This Is the Way" (extended) – 6:44
4. "Me No Want Miseria (Take Me to the End)" – 4:49

== Charts ==
=== Weekly charts ===
Weekly charts for "This Is the Way"
Chart (1994–1996)	Peak position
Denmark (IFPI)	4
Europe (Eurochart Hot 100)	40
Finland (Suomen virallinen lista)	18
France (SNEP)	14
Israel (Israeli Singles Chart)	7
Netherlands (Dutch Top 40)	34
Netherlands (Single Top 100)	26
Scotland (OCC)	56
Sweden (Sverigetopplistan)	1
UK Singles (OCC)	53
UK Dance (OCC)	8
US Hot Dance Club Play (Billboard)	15

=== Year-end charts ===
1994 year-end charts
Chart (1994)	Position
Sweden (Topplistan)	14

1995 year-end charts
Chart (1995)	Position
France (SNEP)	54

== Certifications ==
Region	Certification	Certified units/sales
Sweden (GLF)	Gold	25,000^{^}
^{^} Shipments figures based on certification alone.

== Release history ==
Region	Date	Format(s)	Label(s)	Ref.
Europe	1994	CD	Stockholm	
United Kingdom	11 September 1995	12-inch vinyl; CD; cassette	Ffrreedom	
