= E-Type (musician) =

Swedish musician, songwriter, and producer (born 1965)

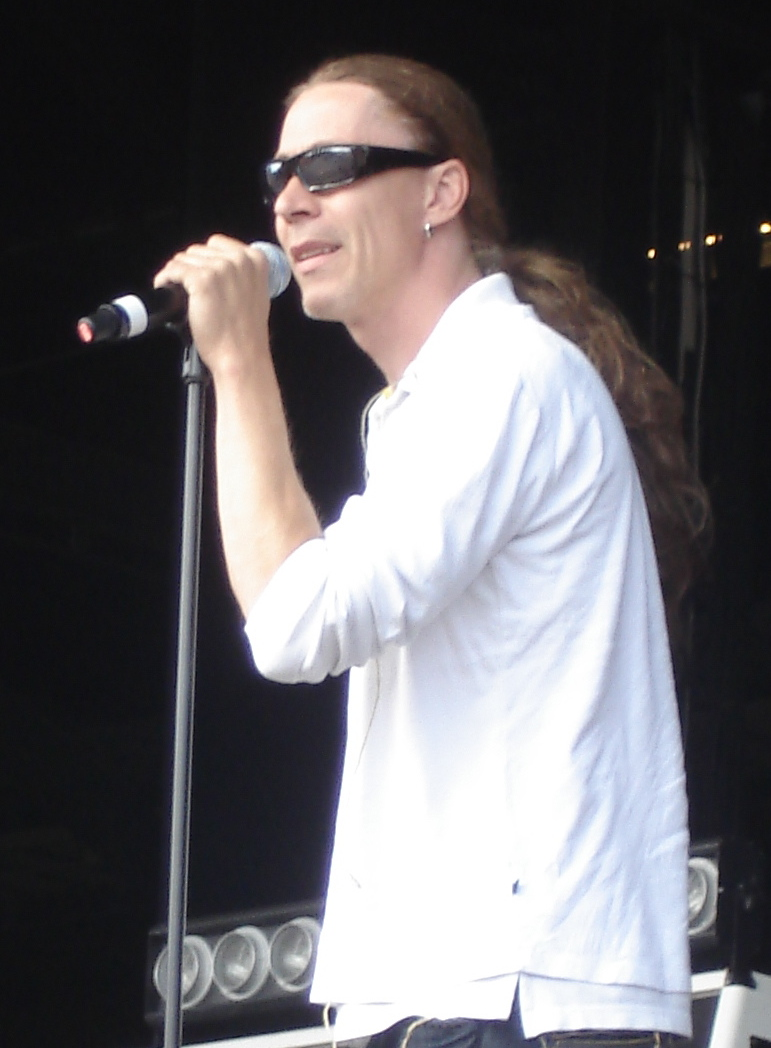
- E-Type on stage during soundcheck at Liseberg in Gothenburg in 2008.

Background information
- Born: Bo Martin Erik Erikson; 27 August 1965 (age 60); Uppsala, Sweden
- Genres: Eurodance; Heavy metal (Dampf)
- Years active: 1991–present
- Label: Stockholm Records
- Partner: Melinda Jacobs (2022–present)
- Website: Facebook page

Bo Martin Erik Erikson (born 27 August 1965), better known by his stage name E-Type, is a Swedish Eurodance musician, songwriter, record producer and former heavy metal drummer. His professional name is based on the Jaguar E-Type sports car.

== Biography ==
=== Early years ===
Erikson was born in Uppsala. His father is Bo ("Bosse") G. Erikson (b. 1933), known as the host of the science TV-show Vetenskapens värld (World of Science) on SVT. His mother's name was Elisabeth and he has one sibling, a sister Erika. His mother died of cancer in 1987.

In his teens, E-Type and his family moved to Bromma, a borough in the western part of Stockholm, and he is currently living in the heart of Stockholm. He started his musical career in the 1980s as a drummer in the speed metal bands Maninnya Blade and Hexenhaus. In 1991, he met up with Stakka Bo with two singles as a result of the partnership: "We Got the Atmosphere" in 1991 and "Numania 1" in 1992. This earned E-Type a job as a VJ on ZTV. His first solo single, "I'm Falling" was released in mid-1993, but did poorly commercially.

=== Success ===
E-Type's breakthrough came in 1994, with the collaboration with the producers from Cheiron (Denniz PoP, Max Martin, and Amadin) on his debut album Made in Sweden. A single from this album, "Set the World on Fire", reached gold status in Sweden, #1 on the Swedish dance chart, #2 on the Swedish sale chart, and #4 in Israel. Eventually four other singles were released from the album: the ballad "Do You Always (Have To Be Alone)?", "This Is the Way" and "Russian Lullaby" (co-written by Jonas Berggren from Ace of Base). "This Is the Way" reached #15 on the Billboard Club Chart in the United States and #6 on the UK Club Chart. Most of the tracks feature the female vocalist Nana Hedin, who is featured on nearly all of E-Type's albums. The album itself was released on 31 October 1994 and reached #2 on the album-chart. Over 100,000 copies were sold in Sweden and the album was listed for 26 weeks.

During 1996, E-Type and the producer-team spent their time working on a second album The Explorer, which was released in Sweden on 23 October. The album sold more than 20,000 copies. His third album, Last Man Standing, was released on 27 November 1998 and went to #1 in Finland and Sweden, going double platinum and platinum respectively. The album remains E-Type's best-selling album with sales of 3 million copies worldwide and includes hit singles like "Angels Crying", "Here I Go Again" and "Princess of Egypt".

E-Type recorded the official song, "Campione 2000" for the 2000 European football championship. In 2001, he released his new single "Life" on 12 November. The forthcoming album release, entitled Euro IV Ever, was postponed until the end of 2001 and finally released on 21 November. An album release party was held on 25 November.

Max Martin, Rami and E-Type produced the album Loud Pipes Save Lives in 2004, and released it on 25 March. It's so far the last E-Type album to feature Nana Hedin on vocals. At the beginning of April, "Paradise" reached #11 in Finland and entered the Finnish Dance chart at position #28. On 14 May 2007 E-Type released a new single called "True Believer". There was also a new album in 2007, Eurotopia, released on 31 October. The album mainly features E-Type's new female vocalist, Sanne Karlsson.

In the spring of 2008, E-Type appeared in Melodifestivalen 2008 and performed the song "Line of Fire" together with the rock band The Poodles. They advanced to a second chance heat, which was held in Kiruna on 8 March, when they lost to Sibel.

The UK record label All Around the World released "True Believer" to the UK market in late 2008, and in mid-2009, "Rain" from Loud Pipes Save Lives was unexpectedly released as a single and music video. In August 2009, a promo single and a new music video for "Life" was released, with newly shot scenes of Nana Hedin intermixed with the original 2001 video.

E-Type released the single "Back 2 Life" in January 2011. "Back 2 Life" was written by E-Type & Johan "Shellback" Schuster and Savan Kotecha (Usher, Celine Dion, Leona Lewis and more) who wrote the lyrics. The producers are Max Martin & Shellback, Şerban Ghenea (Eminem, Kesha, Justin Timberlake and more) who mixed the track.

For gym-goers, E-Type's music has become synonymous with Les Mills International's group fitness class BodyPump. The structure, lyrical content and soaring crescendos suit well the "back track" of the class. E-Type tracks used in this context include "Africa", "Set the World on Fire", "Eurofighter", "True Believer" and "The Tide".

=== Dampf ===
In 2022, Martin changed his genre and founded heavy metal band "Dampf", in which he is the primary songwriter and vocalist. Their first album "The Arrival" was released the same year.

== Vocalists ==
The music of E-Type follows the typical Eurodance formula of synthesizer music built up to a dance floor crescendo, accompanied by his own vocals, and a chorus sung by Nana Hedin (who appeared in the music videos for "Set the World on Fire", "Paradise" and the 2009 re-release of "Life"). Hedin provided vocals for more than half of all E-Type's songs. She made her last appearance on record with E-Type on his 2004 album Loud Pipes Save Lives. In 2009 she was told by doctors that she has cancer in her tongue and she is therefore currently not performing. E-Type's 2007 album, Eurotopia, featured his new vocalist, Sanne Karlsson.

During E-Type's success in the 1990s, dancer Dilnarin "Dee" Demirbag performed in concerts and music videos by lip-syncing to Hedin's vocals. She is featured in several of E-Type's music videos such as "This is the Way", "Calling Your Name", "Angels Crying", "Here I Go Again" and "Life", and appeared on TV shows and concerts. "Dee" left the band in 2001 to pursue a solo career. However, she got back together with E-Type in December 2006 for a concert in Russia, and is still touring with the band occasionally. She also appeared in the 2007 music video for "True Believer".

== Awards ==
E-Type participated in the Swedish Dance Music Awards in March 1995. He won three awards: Best Song, Best Artist and Newcomer. In 1999, E-Type was nominated for a Swedish Grammy in the category 'Modern Dance', along with Dr. Bombay, Richi M and Black Moses.

== Personal life ==
As of spring 2022, E-Type is in a relationship with Melinda Jacobs, known as the foster mother of the late Lilla hjärtat. On August 21, 2022, the couple announced that they were expecting their first child together, and their daughter was born in January 2023. This was E-Type's firstborn since he had not had any children of his own, while this was Jacobs' fourth biological child along with all of her foster children, which she has taken on over the years.

== Discography ==
=== Studio albums ===
Year	Album details	Peak chart positions			Certifications
Year	Album details	SWE	FIN	NOR	Certifications
1994	Made in Sweden: Released: 31 October 1994; Label: Stockholm Records; Formats: LP, CD, Cassette	2	—	—	SWE: Platinum
1996	The Explorer: Release: 23 October 1996; Label: Stockholm Records; Formats: LP, CD, Cassette	5	—	—	SWE: Platinum
1998	Last Man Standing: Release: 27 November 1998; Label: Stockholm Records; Formats: LP, CD, Cassette	1	1	2	SWE: 2× Platinum; FIN Platinum; NOR: Platinum
2001	Euro IV Ever: Release: 21 November 2001; Label: Stockholm Records; Formats: CD, Cassette	2	3	7	SWE: Gold; FIN: Gold
2004	Loud Pipes Save Lives: Release: 25 March 2004; Label: Stockholm Records; Formats: CD, Cassette	2	13	17	SWE: Gold
2007	Eurotopia: Release: 31 October 2007; Label: Lulubelle Records; Formats: CD	10	—	—	
"—" denotes releases that did not chart or were not released.

=== Compilation albums ===
Year	Album details	Peak chart positions			Certifications
Year	Album details	SWE	FIN	NOR	Certifications
1999	Greatest Hits: Released: October 1999; Label: Stockholm Records; Formats: CD, Cassette	12	25	6	SWE: Gold; NOR: Gold
2006	Euro IV Ever in America: Released: 2006; Label: Airus Entertainment LLC/Stockholm Records; Formats: CD	—	—	—	
2006	14 Hits With E-Type: Released: 2006; Label: Universal Music AB; Formats: CD	—	—	—	

=== Singles ===
Year	Single	Peak chart positions						Certifications	Album
Year	Single	SWE	FIN	FRA	NDL	NOR	UK	Certifications	Album
1991	"We Got the Atmosphere" (featuring Stakka Bo)	—	—	—	—	—	—		Non-album tracks
1992	"Numania 1" (featuring Stakka Bo)	—	—	—	—	—	—		Non-album tracks
1993	"I'm Falling"	—	—	—	—	—	—		Non-album tracks
1994	"Set the World on Fire"	2	—	13	48	—	—	SWE: Gold	Made in Sweden
1994	"This Is the Way"	1	18	14	34	—	53	SWE: Gold	Made in Sweden
1995	"Do You Always (Have to Be Alone)?"	13	—	—	—	—	—		Made in Sweden
1995	"So Dem a Com" (France only)	—	—	—	—	—	—		Made in Sweden
1995	"Russian Lullaby"	45	—	35	—	—	—		Made in Sweden
1996	"Megamix"	—	—	15	—	—	—		Non-album track
1996	"Free Like a Flying Demon"	1	—	—	—	—	—	SWE: Gold	The Explorer
1996	"Calling Your Name"	4	—	—	—	—	—	SWE: Gold	The Explorer
1997	"Back in the Loop"	10	20	—	—	—	—		The Explorer
1997	"I Just Wanna Be with You"	10	15	—	—	—	—		The Explorer
1997	"You Will Always Be a Part of Me"	30	—	—	—	—	—		The Explorer
1998	"Angels Crying"	2	2	—	45	2	—	SWE: Platinum; NOR: Platinum	Last Man Standing
1998	"Here I Go Again"	1	1	25	72	3	—	SWE: Platinum; NOR: Platinum	Last Man Standing
1999	"Princess of Egypt"	9	—	—	—	—	—		Last Man Standing
1999	"Hold Your Horses"	26	—	—	—	—	—		Last Man Standing
2000	"Es Ist Nie Vorbei" (featuring Blümchen)	28	—	—	—	—	—		Für Immer und Ewig
2000	"Campione 2000"	2	—	66	4	9	58	SWE: Platinum	Euro IV Ever
2001	"Life" (featuring Na Na)	1	16	—	—	3	—	SWE: Platinum; NOR: Gold	Euro IV Ever
2002	"Africa" (featuring Na Na)	5	13	—	—	—	—		Euro IV Ever
2002	"Banca Banca"	32	—	—	—	—	—		Euro IV Ever
2004	"Paradise"	2	11	—	—	11	—	SWE: Gold	Loud Pipes Save Lives
2004	"Olympia"	4	—	—	—	—	—		Loud Pipes Save Lives
2005	"The Predator / Far Up in the Air"	43	—	—	—	—	—		Loud Pipes Save Lives
2007	"True Believer"	1	3	—	—	—	—	SWE: Gold	Eurotopia
2007	"Eurofighter"	17	—	—	—	—	—		Eurotopia
2008	"Ding Ding Song" (Asia only)	—	—	—	—	—	—		Eurotopia
2008	"Rain" (UK only)	—	—	—	—	—	—		Eurotopia
2008	"Line of Fire" (featuring The Poodles)	3	—	—	—	—	—		Non-album tracks
2011	"Back 2 Life"	53	—	—	—	—	—		Non-album tracks
2011	"Det Löser Sig"	—	—	—	—	—	—		Så mycket bättre - Timbuktus dag (Säsong 2)
2012	"Campione 2012"	—	—	—	—	—	—		Non-album tracks
2019	"Ride the Lightning"	—	—	—	—	—	—		Non-album tracks
2025	"Techno Town"(Little Sis Nora featuring E-Type)	—	—	—	—	—	—		Eurotrash
"—" denotes releases that did not chart or were not released.

=== Notable albums ===
- Dampf - The Arrival (2022)

== See also ==
- List of Eurodance artists
- Swedish singers
- Music of Sweden
