= Nana Hedin =

- Also known as: NaNa
- Born: Nana Hedin Pranschke; 24 May 1968 (age 58); Eskilstuna, Södermanland, Sweden
- Genres: pop eurodance club music
- Occupations: artist, featuring artist, session vocalist
- Instrument: Vocalist
- Years active: 1986–2009
- Website: nanahedin.com

Nana Hedin Pranschke (born 24 May 1968 in Eskilstuna, Södermanland, Sweden), known as Nana Hedin, is a Swedish singer.

== Career ==
NaNa Hedin started her career in the late 1980s, and worked primarily at the Cheiron Studios in Stockholm along with the Cheiron producers Denniz Pop, Max Martin, Kristian Lundin, etc. She recorded backup vocals for many artists such as Celine Dion, Britney Spears, Gary Barlow, Ace of Base, Aqua, and many others.

Hedin also recorded lead vocals for other Swedish artists such as Dr. Alban ("Look Who's Talking"), Stakka Bo ("Here We Go" and the whole Supermarket album released in 1993), Amadin ("Alrabaiye") or Flexx ("Wake Up").

In 2000, Hedin released her own single "Fame 2000" as NaNa D'Aquini under the Danish label Merlin / Playground Scandinavia. It was a cover and remix of the 1980s hit "Fame" by Irene Cara. A music video was shot in Las Vegas and the song was remixed by several DJs worldwide.

In 2005, she entered Melodifestivalen 2005 with the song "Wherever You Go".

Hedin also performed as a 'Primadonna' in theaters and tours between 1993 and 2003 with Swedish stand-up comedian/author Jonas Gardell.

== With E-Type ==
Hedin is mostly known for singing the chorus on most of E-Type's albums between 1994 and 2004, including the hits Set the World on Fire (1994), This Is the Way (1994), Angels Crying (1998), Here I Go Again (1998), and many more. Their last collaboration was for the song Paradise in 2004, which was used to enter Melodifestivalen 2004.

Most of the time, Dilnarin "Dee" Demirbag was on stage and in music videos with E-Type, lip-synching to Hedin's voice. Hedin can be seen in the music videos of "Set the World on Fire" (both versions), "Life" and "Paradise".

== Notable TV appearances ==
Besides the Melodifestivalen appearances in 2004 and 2005, Hedin opened the Swedish Sport Awards in 2007 by singing Pink Floyd's The Great Gig in the Sky, in front of the Swedish King Carl XVI Gustaf of Sweden. It was aired live on SVT from the Globen Arena.

In September 2007, Hedin participated in the musical game show Doobidoo on SVT, and paired up with Janne Carlsson against Ingela "Pling" Forsman & Jan Johansen. She performed Jimi Hendrix's Little Wing, with Carlsson on the drums.

On 2 May 2008 Hedin participated in the music program Så ska det låta. She paired up with Fred Johansson against Sarah Dawn Finer and Patrik Isaksson.

== Awards ==
On 6 June 2018 Hedin received the MVP (Most Valuable Person) Award at the Denniz PoP Awards by a jury consisting of major producers and artists such as Carly Rae Jepsen, Tove Lo, Rami Yacoub and Max Martin. Fans from all over the world voted for her, and she was picked for her behind-the-scenes contribution, helping to form the classic Cheiron sound. Producer and jury member Jacob Schulze says "Without Nana, the Cheiron sound wouldn't have sounded like it did. She's been an invaluable part of the Cheiron story and deserves this prize more than anyone else."

== Cancer ==
In August 2009, Hedin was diagnosed with tongue cancer after being wrongly diagnosed by several specialists in 2008. The tumor was in stage 4 when correctly diagnosed and Hedin finally got treatment. The tumor was life-threatening at that time, and due to the massive radiotherapy treatment necessary she has not performed since. In 2014, she started suffering from osteoradionecrosis due to the radiotherapy. Swedish surgeons said that they would have to reconstruct the complete mandible and that she would never be able to sing again. Hedin started a worldwide search for second opinions to try and find a better surgery to save her voice. In 2022 a Swedish non-profit organization called M.A.S. started a GoFundMe named "Save NaNa's Voice 2022" in order to finance Hedin's journey to India for reconstructive jaw surgery.

== Discography ==
Singles & EP's

- FAME 2000
- It's Raining Men (2004)
- Wherever You Go (2005)

== Featurings ==
- Five
  - Slam Dunk Da Funk
  - Five 1998
- A*Teens
  - Half Way Around the World 2001
- Ace of Base
  - Flowers (album) 1998
  - Life is a Flower
- Amadin
  - Take Me Up (Alrabaiye) 1993
- Ardis Fagerholm
  - Love Addict (album) 1994
- Aqua
  - Aquarius (album) 2000
  - Cartoon Heroes 2000
  - Around The World 2000
  - We Belong to the Sea 2000
  - Back From Mars
  - Freaky Friday
  - Good Guys
  - Goodbye to the Circus
  - Halloween
- Britney Spears
  - Baby One More Time
  - Oops!...I Did It Again
  - (You Drive Me) Crazy
  - Born to Make You Happy
  - Stronger
  - Bombastic Love
  - Don't Go Knockin' On My Door
  - Baby One More Time (album) 1999
  - Oops!...I Did It Again (album) 2000
  - Britney (album) 2001
- Céline Dion
  - That's The Way It Is
  - I'm Alive
  - New Day Has Come (album) 2002
  - One Heart (album) 2003
  - On ne change pas 2005
  - The Greatest Reward
  - Coulda Woulda Shoulda
  - Tous Les Secrets
- Dana Dragomir
  - PanDana (album) 1995
- DJ Bobo
  - World in Motion (album) 1996
  - For Now And Forever
- Dr. Alban
  - Look Who's Talking 1994
  - Away From Home 1994
  - Gimme Dat Lovin 1994
  - Let The Beat Go On 1994
- E-Type
  - Made in Sweden (album) 1994
    - Do You Always
    - Me No Want Miseria
    - Set the World on Fire
    - This is the Way
    - Fight It Back
    - Until the End
    - Will I See You Again
  - The Explorer (album) 1996
    - Calling Your Name
    - Back in the Loop
    - I Just Wanna Be With You
    - Free Like a Flying Demon
    - Forever Wild
    - I'm Not Alone
  - Last Man Standing (album) 1998
    - Angels Crying
    - Here I Go Again
    - Hold Your Horses
    - I'm Flying
    - Morning Light
    - I'll Find A Way
    - So Far Away
  - Euro IV Ever (album) 2001
    - Life
    - Africa
    - Arabian Star
    - When I Close My Eyes
    - Time
    - No More Tears
  - Loud Pipes Save Lives (album) 2004
    - Paradise
    - Far Up in the Air
    - Forever More
- Elephant & Castle
  - DJ Keep This Feeling
- Flexx
  - Wake Up 1993
- Garou
  - Piece of my soul ( album ) 2008
  - Back for more
- Gary Barlow
  - SuperHero
  - For All That You Want
  - Twelve Months Eleven Days (album)
- Herbie
  - I Believe 1995
- Papa Dee
  - First Cut is The Deepest
  - Just Let the Music
  - The Journey (album) 1995
  - The Tide is High
- Luciano Pavarotti & Friends
  - Pavarotti & Friends for Cambodia & Tibet
- Safe
  - Love is All We Need 1995
- Stakka Bo
  - Down the Drain 1993
  - Here We Go 1993
  - Living it Up
  - Supermarket (album) 1993
