= A-Teens discography =

- Studio albums: 3
- Extended plays: 2
- Compilation albums: 2
- Remix albums: 1
- Singles: 14
- Promotional singles: 4
- Music videos: 16

The discography of Swedish pop group A-Teens consists of 3 studio albums, 1 reissue album, 2 compilation albums, 1 remix album, 2 extended plays (EPs), 14 singles, 4 promotional singles and 16 music videos.

== Albums ==
=== Studio albums ===
List of albums, with selected chart positions and certifications.
Title	Details	Peak chart positions										Certifications
Title	Details	SWE	AUT	BEL	FIN	GER	NLD	NOR	SWI	UK	US	Certifications
The ABBA Generation	Released: 25 August 1999; Label: Universal; Formats: CD, cassette	1	2	14	2	2	2	2	12	85	71	GLF: 2× Platinum; BVMI: Gold; IFPI AUT: Gold; IFPI NOR: Platinum; IFPI SWI: Gold; NVPI: Platinum; RIAA: Gold
Teen Spirit	Released: 26 February 2001; Label: Universal; Formats: CD, cassette	2	18	—	33	5	42	37	13	—	50	GLF: Gold; RIAA: Gold
Pop 'til You Drop!	Released: 18 June 2002; Label: MCA; Formats: CD	—	—	—	—	—	—	—	—	—	45	
"—" denotes a recording that did not chart or was not released in that territory.

=== Reissues ===
Title	Details	Peak chart positions		
Title	Details	SWE	GER	NLD
New Arrival	Released: 27 January 2003; Label: Universal; Formats: CD	4	95	91

=== Compilation albums ===
Title	Details	Peak chart positions
Title	Details	SWE
Greatest Hits	Released: 12 May 2004; Label: Universal; Formats: CD, vinyl, digital download	16
14 Hits	Released: 2004; Label: Stockholm, Universal; Formats: CD, vinyl, digital download	—
"—" denotes a recording that did not chart or was not released in that territory.

=== Remix albums ===
Title	Details
The ABBA Generation Remix	Released: 21 February 2001 (Japan only); Label: MCA; Formats: CD, vinyl

== Extended plays ==
Title	Details
Extr-A-Teens	Released: 2000; Label: MCA; Formats: CD
...To the Music	Released: 16 October 2001; Label: MCA; Formats: CD

== Singles ==
List of singles, with selected chart positions and certifications, showing year released and originating album.
Title	Year	Peak chart positions										Certifications	Album
Title	Year	SWE	AUT	GER	NLD	NOR	SPA	SCO	SWI	UK	US	Certifications	Album
"Mamma Mia"	1999	1	14	10	7	3	6	17	9	12	—	GLF: 4× Platinum	The ABBA Generation
"Super Trouper"	1999	2	11	4	11	15	—	19	18	21	—	GLF: Platinum; BVMI: Gold	The ABBA Generation
"Gimme! Gimme! Gimme! (A Man After Midnight)"	1999	10	—	33	24	—	20	–	51	—	—	GLF: Gold	The ABBA Generation
"Happy New Year"	1999	4	—	—	—	—	—	—	—	—	—	GLF: Gold	Non-album single
"Dancing Queen"	2000	—	—	64	88	—	–	—	—	—	95		The ABBA Generation
"Upside Down"	2000	2	34	10	28	—	15	5	7	10	93	GLF: 2× Platinum	Teen Spirit
"Halfway Around the World"	2001	7	—	51	—	—	—	22	73	30	—	GLF: Gold	Teen Spirit
"Sugar Rush"	2001	15	—	72	—	—	—	55	—	—	—		Teen Spirit
"Heartbreak Lullaby"	2001	6	—	77	—	—	—	—	97	—	—		The Princess Diaries - Soundtrack
"Can't Help Falling in Love"	2002	12	—	—	50	—	—	—	—	—	—		Lilo & Stitch - Soundtrack and Pop 'til You Drop
"Floorfiller"	2002	4	46	33	—	—	—	—	—	—	—	GLF: Gold	Pop 'til You Drop and New Arrival
"A Perfect Match"	2003	2	—	77	—	—	—	—	—	—	—		New Arrival
"I Promised Myself"	2004	2	—	—	—	—	—	—	—	—	—		Greatest Hits
"Iconic"	2026	1	—	—	—	—	—	—	—	— (Note: "Iconic" did not enter the UK Singles Chart but debuted at number 28 on the UK Singles Downloads Chart.)	—	GLF: Gold	Non-album singles
"You Got the Look"	2026	—	—	—	—	—	—	—	—	—	—		Non-album singles
"—" denotes a recording that did not chart or was not released in that territory.

=== Promotional singles ===
Title	Year	Album
"The Name of the Game"	2000	The ABBA Generation
"Take a Chance on Me"	2000	The ABBA Generation
"Let Your Heart Do All The Talking"	2003	New Arrival
"Bounce with Me"	2003	Non-album single

== Other appearances ==
Title	Year	Album
"Under the Sea"	2002	Disneymania
"I Wish It Could Be Christmas Everyday"	2002	Radio Disney Holiday Jams, Vol. 2

== Videography ==
=== Music videos ===
Title	Year	Director
"Mamma Mia"	1999	Henrik Sylvén
"Super Trouper"	1999	Sebastian Reed
"Gimme! Gimme! Gimme! (A Man After Midnight)"	1999	Sebastian Reed
"Happy New Year"	1999	
"Dancing Queen"	2000	Patrick Kiely
"The Name of the Game" (Sweden only)	2000	
"Take a Chance on Me" (Sweden only)	2000	
"Upside Down"	2000	Patrick Kiely
"Halfway Around the World"	2001	Mikadelica
"Sugar Rush"	2001	Patrick Kiely
"Heartbreak Lullaby"	2001	
"Can't Help Falling in Love"	2002	Gregory Dark
"Can't Help Falling in Love" (Lilo & Stitch version)	2002	Gregory Dark
"Floorfiller"	2002	Sanaa Hamri
"A Perfect Match"	2003	A-Teens
"I Promised Myself"	2004	Gustav Johnson

=== Video albums ===
Title	Year	Details	Notes	Ref.
Bouncing Off The Ceiling (Upside Down) / Mamma Mia	2001	Released: 15 May 2001; Label: MCA; Format: DVD single	Includes: "Upside Down" and "Mamma Mia" videos.	
The DVD Collection	2001	Released: 13 November 2001; Label: MCA; Format: DVD	Includes: "Sugar Rush" (video), "Halfway Around The World" (video), "Upside Down (Bouncing Off The Ceiling)" (video), "Dancing Queen" (video), "Gimme! Gimme! Gimme!" (video), "Super Trouper" (video), "Mamma Mia" (video); Unreleased tracks (audio): "Give It Up", "Can't Stop The Pop", "Don't Even Know Your Name"; Band interviews; photo gallery and web links.	
Floorfiller	2002	Released: 29 October 2002; Label: MCA; Format: DVD	Includes: "Floorfiller" (video), "Sugar Rush" (video).	

== See also ==
- List of songs recorded by A-Teens
