= List of songs recorded by A-Teens =

The A-Teens logo

The following is a list of released songs recorded and performed by A-Teens.

Song	Artist(s)	Writer(s)	Album(s)	Year	Ref.
A Perfect Match	A-Teens	Marcus Sepehrmanesh; Mats Jansson; Robert Habolin; Håkan Fredriksson	New Arrival	2003	
All My Love	A-Teens	Leif Sundin	Teen Spirit	2001	
Around the Corner of Your Eye	A-Teens	Fredrik Thomander	Teen Spirit	2001	
Back for More	A-Teens	Fredrik Thomander	Teen Spirit	2001	
Can't Help Falling in Love	A-Teens	Luigi Creatore; Hugo Peretti; George David Weiss	Pop 'til You Drop! New Arrival	2002	
Closer to Perfection	A-Teens	Alexandra	Pop 'til You Drop! New Arrival	2002; 2003	
Cross My Heart	A-Teens	Grizzly	Pop 'til You Drop! New Arrival	2002	
Dancing Queen	A-Teens	Stig Anderson; Benny Andersson; Björn Ulvaeus	The ABBA Generation	1999	
Firefly	A-Teens	Fredrik Thomander	Teen Spirit	2001	
Floorfiller	A-Teens	Grizzly	Pop 'til You Drop! New Arrival	2002	
For All That I Am	A-Teens	(Andreas Claeson, John Hjalmarsson, Johan Folke Norberg)	Teen Spirit	2001	
Gimme! Gimme! Gimme! (A Man After Midnight)	A-Teens	Benny Andersson; Björn Ulvaeus	The ABBA Generation	1999	
Halfway Around the World	A-Teens	Jonsson, Sepehrmanesh, Tysper	Teen Spirit	2001	
Have a Little Faith in Me	A-Teens		New Arrival	2003	
Heartbreak Lullaby (Ballad Version)	A-Teens	Cathy Dennis	New Arrival	2003	
Hi and Goodbye	A-Teens	Leah Andreone; Marti Frederiksen; Billy Steinberg	Pop 'til You Drop!	2002	
I Promised Myself	A-Teens	Nick Kamen	Greatest Hits	2004	
In the Blink of an Eye	A-Teens	The Tremolo Beer Gut	Pop 'til You Drop! New Arrival	2002	
Lay All Your Love on Me	A-Teens	Benny Andersson; Björn Ulvaeus	The ABBA Generation	1999	
Let Your Heart Do All the Talking	A-Teens	Grizzly	Pop 'til You Drop! New Arrival	2002; 2003	
Mamma Mia	A-Teens	Stig Anderson; Benny Andersson; Björn Ulvaeus	The ABBA Generation	1999	
Morning Light	A-Teens	E-Type; Kristian Lundin	Teen Spirit	2001	
Oh, Oh...Yeah	A-Teens	David Eriksen; Tom Nichols	Pop 'til You Drop!	2002	
One Night in Bangkok	A-Teens	Benny Andersson; Tim Rice; Björn Ulvaeus	New Arrival	2003	
One of Us	A-Teens	Benny Andersson; Björn Ulvaeus	The ABBA Generation	1999	
Our Last Summer	A-Teens	Benny Andersson; Björn Ulvaeus	The ABBA Generation	1999	
Rockin'	A-Teens	Sigurd Rosnes	Teen Spirit	2001	
S.O.S.	A-Teens	Stig Anderson; Benny Andersson; Björn Ulvaeus	The ABBA Generation	1999	
School's Out	A-Teens feat. Alice Cooper	Michael Bruce; Glen Buxton; Alice Cooper; Dennis Dunaway; Neal Smith	Pop 'til You Drop! New Arrival	2002	
Shame Shame Shame	A-Teens	Sylvia Robinson	New Arrival	2003	
Shangri-La	A-Teens	The Tremolo Beer Gut	New Arrival	2003	
Singled Out	A-Teens	Red One	Pop 'til You Drop!	2002	
Slam	A-Teens	Red One	Pop 'til You Drop!	2002	
Slammin' Kinda Love	A-Teens	Jan Kask; Peter Mansson	Teen Spirit	2001	
Sugar Rush	A-Teens	Fredrik Thomander	Teen Spirit	2001	
Super Trouper	A-Teens	Benny Andersson; Björn Ulvaeus	The ABBA Generation	1999	
Take a Chance on Me	A-Teens	Benny Andersson; Björn Ulvaeus	The ABBA Generation	1999	
That's What (It's All About)	A-Teens	Stefan Nee, Tysper	Teen Spirit	2001	
The Letter	A-Teens	Wayne Carson Thompson	New Arrival	2003	
The Name of the Game	A-Teens	Stig Anderson; Benny Andersson; Björn Ulvaeus	The ABBA Generation	1999	
This Year	A-Teens	Fredrik Thomander	Pop 'til You Drop!	2002	
...to the Music	A-Teens	J Boogie; Red One	Teen Spirit	2001	
Under the Sea	A-Teens	Alan Menken, Howard Ashman	Disneymania	2002	
Upside Down	A-Teens	Gustav Jonsson, Markus Reza Sepehrmanesh, Tommy Tysper	Teen Spirit	2001	
Voulez-Vous	A-Teens	Benny Andersson; Björn Ulvaeus	The ABBA Generation	1999	
The Final Cut	A-Teens		Greatest Hits	2004	
With or Without You	A-Teens		Greatest Hits	2004	
