= Greatest Hits (A-Teens album) =

Greatest hits album by A-Teens
- Released: 5 May 2004
- Recorded: 1999–2004
- Genres: Pop, europop, teen pop, bubblegum pop
- Length: 55:33
- Label: Universal Music Group
- Producers: Grizzly, Tysper, Mark Hammond, Ole Evenrude, Thomas Johansson, Ronald Malberg, Stefan Árberg, Red One, Tobias Lindell, Peter Björklund, Jan Kask, Peter Mansso, Nick Jarl, David Stenmarck

A-Teens chronology
New Arrival (2003)	Greatest Hits (2004)	14 Hits (2004)

Singles from Greatest Hits
- 1. "I Promised Myself" Released: 4 April 2004

Professional ratings
Review scores
Source	Rating
Allmusic	link

Greatest Hits is A-Teens' latest album. It is a compilation including their biggest worldwide hits, such as "Mamma Mia", "Upside Down", "Halfway Around the World", "Floorfiller", and many others. Every track included on the album (except for the new tracks) reached the Top 20 in at least one country.

The album was planned to be released in early 2004, but due to problems with Stockholm Records/Universal Music, A-Teens released the album on May 5, 2004.

For the release of this album, the A-Teens called all their fans through their website asking for pictures, and they included the pictures on the booklet of the album. The tracks "The Final Cut" and "With or Without You" were written by the members of the band, giving messages of "goodbye" and "thanks" to their fans.

This album was not released worldwide. Instead, it was released in selected territories where Universal thought it would do well. These included Mexico, Argentina, Germany, and some other European and Asian countries.

The album went on to sell over 10,000 copies in Argentina and another 3,000 in Brazil; overall, the album sold relatively well in Latin America and some parts of Europe, where "I Promised Myself" was a huge hit.

An American edition was planned for this album, and it was going to be released through Interscope Records in late 2004. However despite their success in North America, the A-Teens were already finishing their Greatest Hits Tour in Sweden and they didn't want to promote in America as Dhani was about to release his first solo single there, so Interscope cancelled the release. The album was eventually made available digitally worldwide on September 10, 2020, along with the rest of A-Teens album discography.

== Track listing ==
No.	Title	Writer(s)	Length
1.	"Mamma Mia"	Benny Andersson, Björn Ulvaeus, Stig Anderson	3:43
2.	"Upside Down"	Gustav Jonsson, Markus Reza Sepehrmanesh, Tommy Tysper	3:13
3.	"Gimme! Gimme! Gimme! (A Man After Midnight)"	Andersson, Ulvaeus	3:54
4.	"Floorfiller"	Jonsson, Sepehrmanesh, Tysper	3:12
5.	"Dancing Queen"	Andersson, Ulvaeus, Anderson	3:48
6.	"A Perfect Match" (Single Mix)	Robert Habolin, Mats Jansson, Sepehrmanesh	3:00
7.	"...to the Music"	Flame, Rebecca Hortlund, J. Boogie, RedOne	3:20
8.	"Halfway Around the World"	Jonsson, Sepehrmanesh, Tysper	3:38
9.	"Sugar Rush"	Fredrik Thomander, Anders Wikström	3:02
10.	"Super Trouper"	Andersson, Ulvaeus	3:50
11.	"Heartbreak Lullaby" (ballad version)	Jan Kask, Peter Mansson, Cathy Dennis	4:08
12.	"Can't Help Falling in Love"	George David Weiss, Hugo Peretti, Luigi Creatore	3:04
13.	"Let Your Heart Do All the Talking"	Johnson, Sepehrmanesh, Tysper	3:24
14.	"The Final Cut"	David Stenmarck, Niklas Jarl, Dhani Lennevald, Marie Serneholt	3:20
15.	"With or Without You"	Stenmarck, Jarl, Sara Lumholdt, Amit Paul	3:03
16.	"I Promised Myself"	Nick Kamen	3:31

== Weekly charts ==
Chart (2004)	Peak position
Swedish Albums (Sverigetopplistan)	16
