= Floorfiller =

2002 single by A-Teens

Single by A-Teens

from the album Pop 'til You Drop! and New Arrival
- Released: 5 July 2002
- Genre: Europop; nu-disco; dance-pop
- Length: 3:13
- Label: Stockholm; MCA
- Songwriters: Grizzly; Tysper; Mack
- Producers: Grizzly; Tysper

A-Teens singles chronology
"Can't Help Falling in Love" (2002)	"Floorfiller" (2002)	"A Perfect Match" (2003)

Music video
- "Floorfiller" on YouTube

"Floorfiller" is a song by Swedish pop group A-Teens. It was released on 5 July 2002 in the United States as the second single from their third studio album, Pop 'til You Drop!. It was later released on 14 October 2002 in Europe as the first single from the group's fourth studio album, New Arrival. The track was written by Grizzly, Tysper and Mack, who had previously worked with the group on several songs on their second studio album, Teen Spirit, including "Upside Down" and "Halfway Around the World".

== Music video ==
The Sanaa Hamri directed video was filmed at the Loft, a club in Los Angeles. The A-Teens participated in the creation of the concept for the video. The video was choreographed by Charles Klapow, who would later be the choreographer for the 2006 Disney Channel Original Movie High School Musical.

== Track listing ==
European CD single
No.	Title	Length
1.	"Floorfiller" (Radio Version)	3:13
2.	"Floorfiller" (Extended Version)	4:04

European maxi CD single
No.	Title	Length
1.	"Floorfiller" (Radio Version)	3:13
2.	"Floorfiller" (Extended Version)	4:04
3.	"Floorfiller" (My Short Version)	3:03
4.	"Floorfiller" (My Long Version)	4:34

US DVD single
No.	Title	Length
1.	"Floorfiller" (Music Video)	3:00
2.	"Sugar Rush" (Music Video)	3:22

== Charts ==
=== Weekly charts ===
Chart (2002–03)	Peak position
Austria (Ö3 Austria Top 40)	36
Germany (GfK)	33
Sweden (Sverigetopplistan)	4

=== Year-end charts ===
Chart (2002)	Position
Sweden (Sverigetopplistan)	31
Chart (2003)	Position
Sweden (Sverigetopplistan)	45

== Certifications ==
Region	Certification	Certified units/sales
Sweden (GLF)	Gold	15,000^{^}
^{^} Shipments figures based on certification alone.
