= Organized Crime (disambiguation) =

Organized crime is a group or operation run by criminals, most commonly for the purpose of generating a monetary profit.

Organized Crime may also refer to:

- Organized Crime (Mambo Kurt album), 2005
- Organized Crime (Treat album), 1989
- Law & Order: Organized Crime, an American crime-drama television series
