= Dream Hunter =

Dream Hunter or Dream Hunters may refer to:

- Dreamhunter (album), 1987, by Swedish hard rock band Treat
- Dream Hunter Fandora a Japanese OVA series released from 1985 to 1986
- Dream Hunter Rem a Japanese OVA series released from 1985 to 1992
- The Sandman: The Dream Hunters a novella by Neil Gaiman
- Dreamhunter, the first book of the Dreamhunter Duet by Elizabeth Knox
