= The ABBA Generation Remix =

Remix album by A-Teens
- Released: 21 February 2001
- Recorded: 1999; Sweden
- Genre: Pop, dance, Europop
- Label: MCA Japan

A-Teens chronology
The ABBA Generation (1999)	The ABBA Generation Remix (2001)	Teen Spirit (2001)

The ABBA Generation Remix is an A-Teens album, a compilation of the best remixes of their singles from their first album, The ABBA Generation.

Released in Japan only, including 12 re-mixed tracks and exclusive artwork. This album was released after the success of the first album in the Asian country.

== Track listing ==
No.	Title	Writer(s)	Remixed by	Length
1.	"Dancing Queen" (Pierre J's Main Radio Mix)	Benny Andersson; Björn Ulvaeus; Stig Anderson	Pierre J	3:27
2.	"Mamma Mia" (The Bold & the Beautiful Glamour Mix Edit)	Andersson; Ulvaeus; Anderson	The Bold & the Beautiful	3:46
3.	"Super Trouper" (W.I.P.)	Andersson; Ulvaeus	Work in Progress	6:10
4.	"Mamma Mia" (Giuseppe Remix)	Andersson; Ulvaeus; Anderson	Giuseppe	5:35
5.	"Super Trouper" (The Bold & the Beautiful Glamour Mix)	Andersson; Ulvaeus	The Bold & the Beautiful	6:50
6.	"Dancing Queen" (BTS Gold Edition Mix)	Andersson; Ulvaeus; Anderson	BTS	5:13
7.	"Super Trouper" (Super Super Remix)	Andersson; Ulvaeus	Pierre J	8:58
8.	"Gimme! Gimme! Gimme! (A Man After Midnight)" (Earthbound Late Show Remix)	Andersson; Ulvaeus	Earthbound	5:04
9.	"Super Trouper" (Pinocchio Remix)	Andersson; Ulvaeus	Pinocchio	5:08
10.	"Mamma Mia" (Trouser Enthusiasts' Undying Dub)	Andersson; Ulvaeus; Anderson	Trouser Enthusiasts	9:20
11.	"Happy New Year" (Extended Version)	Andersson; Ulvaeus	BTS	6:52
12.	"A-Teens Medley" (Pierre J's Full Length Mix)	Andersson; Ulvaeus; Anderson	Pierre J	8:19
