= Sara Love =

Sara Love may refer to:

- Sara Lumholdt (born 1984), also known as Sara Love, Swedish pop singer
- Sara N. Love (born 1967), member of the Maryland House of Delegates
