= Pop 'til You Drop! =

Studio album by A-Teens
- Released: 18 June 2002
- Recorded: 2001–2002 in Sweden
- Genre: Pop; Euro-pop
- Length: 40:32
- Label: Stockholm; MCA
- Producer: Grizzly; Tysper; Mark Hammond; Chris Nelson; Tobias Lindell; Peter Böstrom; RedOne; David Eriksen; Peter Björklund

A-Teens chronology
Teen Spirit (2001)	Pop 'til You Drop! (2002)	New Arrival (2003)

Singles from Pop 'til You Drop!
- 1. "Can't Help Falling in Love" Released: 13 May 2002; 2. "Floorfiller" Released: 5 July 2002

Professional ratings
Review scores
Source	Rating
Allmusic	2/5 stars
Plugged In (publication)	(favorable)

Pop 'til You Drop! is the third studio album by Swedish pop group A-Teens, released in 2002 exclusively in North America and Argentina. Recorded between 2001 and 2002 in Stockholm, Sweden, the album saw the group having more involvement in the composition of the album, with the members having co-writing credits on several of the tracks. The first single from the album was a cover of Elvis Presley's "Can't Help Falling in Love", which was part of Lilo & Stitch's soundtrack. The second and final single from the album was "Floorfiller". The song "This Year" later appeared on the Kim Possible soundtrack.

The album peaked at #45 on the Billboard charts. The album was supported with their first headlining tour in the United States. Six months after the release of Pop 'til You Drop!, it was reissued for the European market as New Arrival.

== Track listing ==
No.	Title	Writer(s)	Length
1.	"Floorfiller"	Gustav Jonsson, Markus Sepehrmanesh, Tommy Tysper	3:13
2.	"Can't Help Falling in Love"	George David Weiss, Hugo Peretti, Luigi Creatore	3:04
3.	"Let Your Heart Do All the Talking"	Johnson, Sepehrmanesh, Tysper	3:24
4.	"Closer to Perfection"	Alexandra Talomaa	3:11
5.	"Hi and Goodbye"	Anders Wikström, Fredrik Thomander	4:13
6.	"This Year"	Billy Steinberg, Leah Andreone, Marti Frederiksen	2:52
7.	"Slam"	AJ Junior, Dhani Lennevald, RedOne, Sara Lumholdt, Savan Kotecha, ShawnDark	3:04
8.	"Cross My Heart"	Johnson, Sepehrmanesh, Tysper, Marie Serneholt	3:35
9.	"Singled Out"	AJ Junior, Lennevald, RedOne, Kotecha, ShawnDark	4:13
10.	"Oh, Oh...Yeah"	David Eriksen, Tom Nichols	3:04
11.	"In the Blink of an Eye"	Tremolo, Serneholt	3:30
12.	"School's Out" (featuring Alice Cooper)	Alice Cooper, Dennis Dunaway, Glen Buxton, Michael Bruce, Neal Smith	3:02

== Credits ==
A*Teens

- Marie Serneholt - vocals
- Sara Lumholdt - vocals
- Dhani Lennevald - vocals
- Amit Paul - vocals

Guest/session musicians

- Mats Berntoft - guitar
- Peter Björklund - backing vocals
- Melody Chambers - backing vocals
- Alice Cooper - guest vocals (12)
- David Eriksen - keyboards
- Uno Forsberg - trumpet
- Johan Håkansson - saxophone (alto, baritone)
- Mats Johansson - guitar
- Kristina Johnsson - backing vocals
- Thomas Lindberg - bass
- Tobias Lindell - beats
- Esbjörn Öhrwall - guitar
- Jeanette Olsson - backing vocals
- Børge Petersen-Øverlier - guitar
- Andrew Ramsey - guitar (acoustic, electric)
- RedOne - guitar, multi-instruments, backing vocals
- Anna Sahlin - backing vocals
- Markus Sigvardsson - bass
- Tomas Sjögren - trumpet
- Magnus Strömberg - piano
- Odile Tuniche - percussion
- Tysper - backing vocals

Crew

- Stefan Åberg - mixing
- Leah Andreone - composer
- Peter Björklund - arranger, mixing, producer
- Peter Boström - engineer, mixing, producer
- Michael Bruce - composer (12)
- Glen Buxton - composer (12)
- Melody Chambers - vocal arrangement
- Alice Cooper - composer (12)
- Becky Corcoran - vocal arrangement
- Luigi Creatore - composer
- Dave Dillbeck - (digital) editing
- Dennis Dunaway - composer (12)
- Bjorn Engelmann - mastering
- David Eriksen - arranger, composer, engineer, producer, programming
- Marti Frederiksen - composer
- Grizzly - composer
- Mark Hammond - arranger, producer, programming, vocal arrangement
- Patrik Henzel - mixing
- Bill Importico - mixing
- Anders Johansson & Nuthouse - A&R
- Raz Kennedy - vocal producer, vocal production assistance
- Tobias Lindell - arranger, mixing, producer
- Tomas Ljung - vocal engineer
- Christer Mellstrom - production coordination
- Chris Nelson - engineer, mixing, producer
- Tom Nichols - composer (10)
- Bridgett Evans O'Lannerghty - production coordination
- Mats Oscarsson - photography
- Hugo Peretti - composer
- RedOne - composer, engineer, producer
- Rob 'n' Raz - engineer
- Dan Shike - assistant
- F. Reid Shippen - mixing
- Neal Smith - composer (12)
- Billy Steinberg - composer (5)
- Magnus Strömberg - string arrangements
- Fredrik Thomander - composer
- The Tremolo Beer Gut - composer
- Tysper - arranger, engineer, horn arrangements, mixing, multi-instruments, producer
- George David Weiss - composer

== Weekly charts ==
Chart (2002)	Peak position
US Billboard 200	45
