= Sara Lumholdt =

Swedish pop singer, pole dancer (b. 1984)

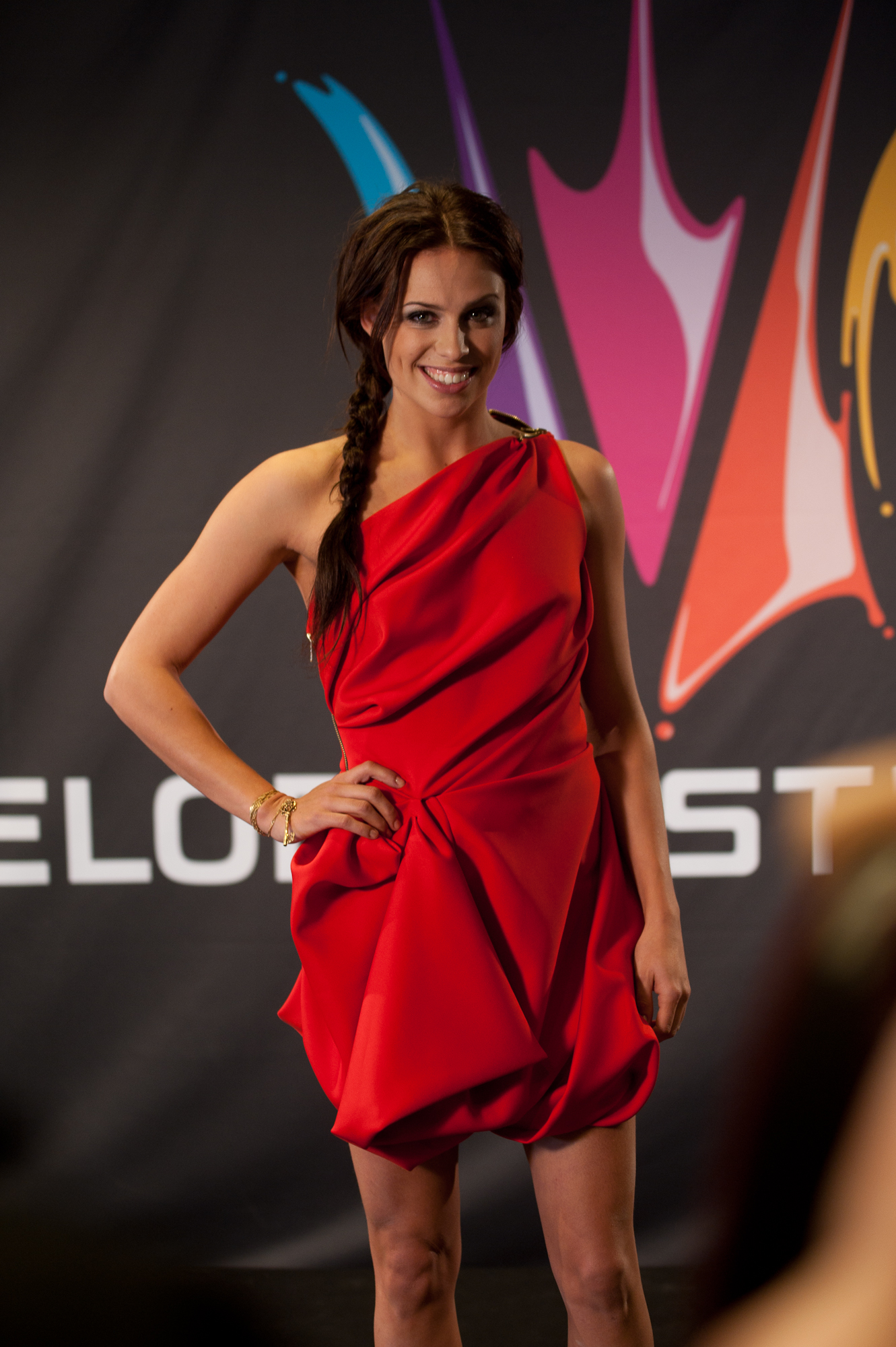
- Lumholdt at a press conference for the 2011 Melodifestivalen

Background information
- Also known as: Sara Lumholdt; Sara Love
- Born: Sara Helena Lumholdt; 25 October 1984 (age 42); Stockholm, Sweden
- Genres: Pop; rock
- Occupation: Singer
- Instrument: Vocals
- Years active: 1998–present
- Member of: A-Teens

Sara Helena Lumholdt (born 25 October 1984) is a Swedish pop singer and champion pole dancer. She was a member of the Swedish quartet A-Teens, and briefly pursued a solo recording career after the band dissolved.

== Career ==
=== A-Teens (1998–2004) ===
In 1998, at the age of 14, Lumholdt signed a record deal with Stockholm Records (part of Universal Music Group) along with her then bandmates Marie, Dhani and Amit. Together they performed as the A-Teens. In 1999, they released their first single, a cover of ABBA's Mamma Mia. The single topped the charts in Sweden for 8 consecutive weeks, and the success was similar around the world.

By 2000, the A-Teens' first album, The ABBA Generation had sold 4 million copies, and they became one of the most internationally successful Swedish pop bands.

After six years together and more than 5 million albums sold, the A-Teens disbanded following a Greatest Hits album and a final tour in Sweden.

=== Solo career ===
Despite worldwide success, the A-Teens disbanded in 2004 and Lumholdt took a short break from the limelight.

In September 2005, Lumholdt landed a voice-over part in the Swedish release of Electronic Arts racing game, Burnout: Revenge. She also booked a couple of gigs in local sports club, Ballbreaker, singing the Swedish national anthem for the World Cup Championship in 2006. Since late 2005, Lumholdt has been working with local Swedish producers and songwriters, as well as producers in New York City and Los Angeles on her solo debut tracks. On 14 March 2007, using the stage name "Sara Love", she released a cover of Olivia Newton-John's hit, "Physical" for a promotional CD for clothing company WeSC, on their album Let's Get Physical with WeSC.

In early 2008, she released several new tracks, including "Glamour Bitch" featuring Milano Money. The song was first released on her MySpace profile, and was quickly picked up by NRJ radio and became the Smash Hit of the Week. The single debuted at No. 57 on the Swedish Single Charts for the week of 13 September 2007. In 2011 she participated in Melodifestivalen 2011, singing the song "Enemy", finished 7th in the third semi-final on 19 February.

In 2012 she was the host of Xtra Factor on TV11, the aftershow of the X Factor.

Lately Lumholdt has been working as a pole dancing instructor and is one of the founders of FLOW, a pole dance studio based in Sweden. In 2014, Sara won Swedish Championships in pole dance.

== Recording ==
Lumholdt spent February to May 2008 in Los Angeles, writing and recording songs with Josh Skinner, with the help of Grammy award-winning producer Ted Perlman. In June she released a pop song titled "First". Lumholdt said about the song that "it's about putting yourself first, it's about self-esteem". The team also wrote songs titled "Where Does the Love Go?", and "Kiss Me Goodbye".

== Personal life ==
Lumholdt announced she was engaged to Chris Noble in March 2017; the couple married in August 2018. On 17 August 2020, their son Oscar Peter was born. A second child is currently on the way, and they live in the UK.

Lumholdt currently works at an office as a financing and operations manager.

== Discography ==
=== Albums ===
- Summer 2010 "Back to You"

=== Singles ===
- "Let's Get Physical"
- "Glamour Bitch"
- "First"
- "Enemy"
