= Organized Crime (Treat album) =

Studio album by Treat
- Released: 1989
- Recorded: Frankfurt, Germany
- Studio: Hotline Studios
- Genre: Hard rock
- Label: Vertigo Records
- Producer: Peter Hauke

Treat chronology
Dreamhunter (1987)	Organized Crime (1989)	Treat (1992)

Professional ratings
Review scores
Source	Rating
Rock Hard	6/10

Organized Crime, released in 1989, is the fourth album released by the Swedish rock band Treat.

== Critical reception ==
Upon the release Ian McCann of New Musical Express described the music of the album as "ten unmemorable songs featuring that neglected metal instrument, the organ."

== Track listing ==
Vertigo Records – 838 929-1 Side 1
No.	Title	Length
1.	"Ready for the Taking"	5:22
2.	"Party All Over"	3:33
3.	"Keep Your Hands to Yourself"	5:26
4.	"Stay Away"	4:38
5.	"Conspiracy"	4:28

Side 2
No.	Title	Length
1.	"Mr. Heartache"	4:39
2.	"Gimme One More Night"	4:27
3.	"Get You on the Run"	4:10
4.	"Home Is Where Your Heart Is"	4:12
5.	"Fatal Smile"	4:06

Vertigo Records – 838 929-2 CD bonus track
No.	Title	Length
1.	"Hunger"	4:50

== Personnel ==
Treat:

- Robert Ernlund – vocals
- Anders "Gary" Wikström – guitar, backing vocals
- Patrick "Green" Appelgren – keyboards, backing vocals
- Joakim "Joe" Larsson – bass, backing vocals
- Jamie Borger – drums, backing vocals
