= Amit Sebastian Paul =

Amit Paul
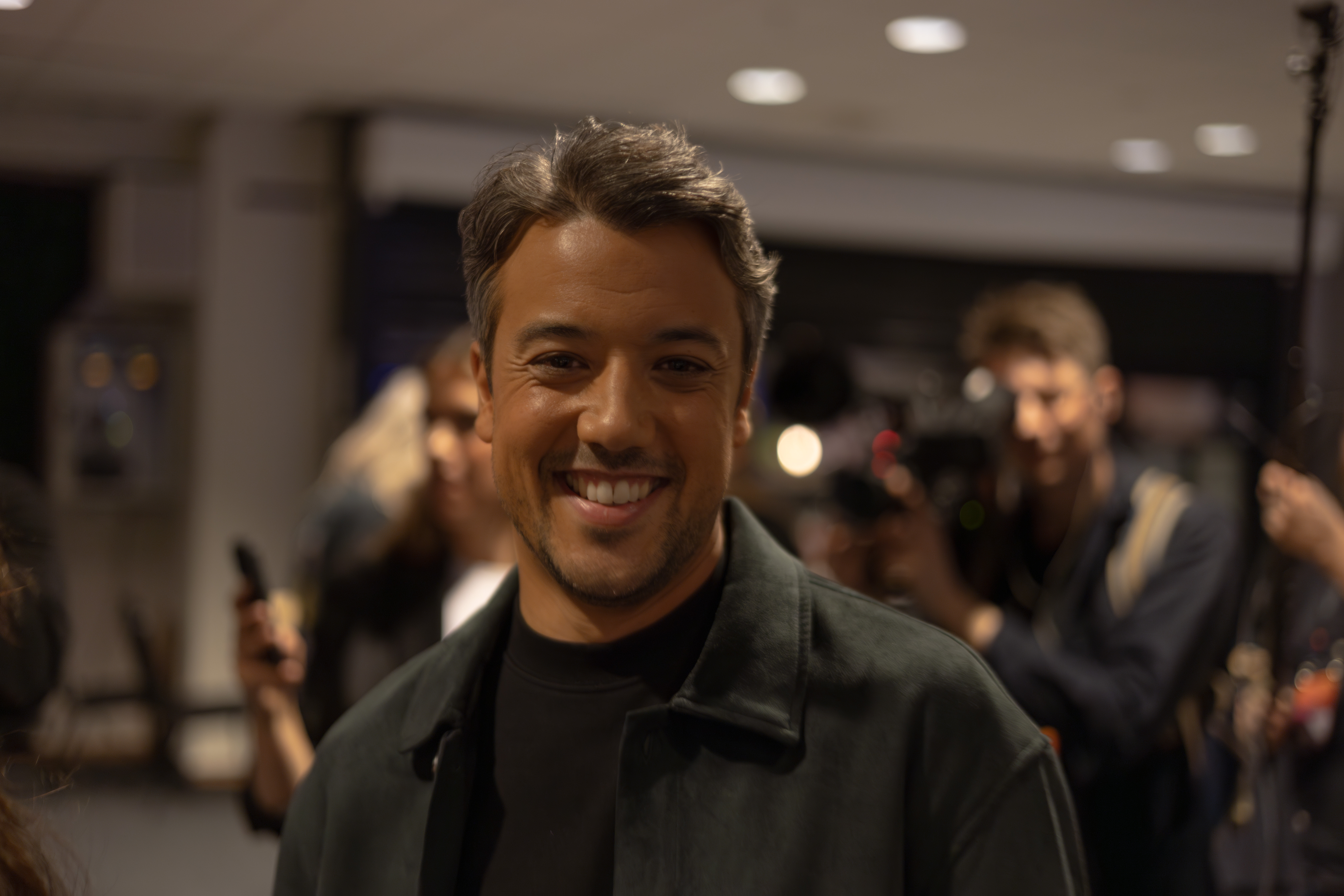
- Amit Paul in 2024

Background information
- Born: Amit Sebastian Paul; 29 October 1983 (age 42); Boden, Sweden
- Genres: Euro-pop; pop
- Occupations: Singer; businessman
- Instrument: Vocals
- Years active: 1998–2009, since 2024
- Member of: A-Teens
- Spouse: Unnur Ýrr Helgadóttir (m. 2012)
- Website: Amitpaul.com

Amit Sebastian Paul (Bengali: অমিত সেবাস্তিয়ান পল; born 29 October 1983) is a Swedish businessman and singer. He is a member of the Swedish pop band A-Teens, who performed together from 1998 to 2004. He briefly pursued a solo recording career after A-Teens disbanded in May 2004. The band reunited again in 2024 to perform as an interval act in Melodifestivalen 2024 and compete in Melodifestivalen 2026, Sweden's Eurovision Song Contest preselection.

== Early life, family and education ==
Paul was born in Boden, Sweden. His father is a Bengali Hindu who moved to Sweden from India 10 years before Amit's birth, while his mother was originally from Värmland.

He earned his Master of Business degree from the Stockholm School of Economics in 2009.

== Music career ==
=== A-Teens (1998–2004) ===
In 1998, Paul signed a record deal with Stockholm Records (part of Universal Music Group), with his then-bandmates Marie, Dhani and Sara. Together they performed as the A-Teens. In 1999, they released their first single, a cover of ABBA's "Mamma mia". The single topped the charts in Sweden for eight consecutive weeks, and the success was similar worldwide.

By 2000, the A-Teens' début album, The ABBA Generation, had sold 4 million copies, making them one of the most successful Swedish pop bands internationally.

After six years together and over 5 million albums sold, the A-Teens disbanded following a Greatest Hits album and a final tour in Sweden.

=== Solo ===
In April 2008, Amit released his first solo album Songs in a Key of Mine, which features 12 songs; his first single "Judge You" was released shortly afterward.

=== A-Teens reunion (2024–present) ===
A-Teens reunited as a group in February 2024 and qualified to the final of Melodifestivalen 2026 with their song "Iconic," written by Dino Medanhodžić, Jimmy Jansson, Lina Hansson, Moa "Cazzi Opeia" Carlebecker, and Thomas G:son. They advanced to the final, where they placed seventh.

== Business career ==
Amit earned his Masters of Business degree at the Stockholm School of Economics in 2009 and completed an internship at the management consultancy Bain & Company. In 2010, he joined his family business, Paxymer AB which specialises in flame retardants and product development within polymer chemistry. He is currently serving as Managing Director.

== Personal life ==
Paul married Unnur Ýrr Helgadóttir, an Icelandic graphic designer in 2012. On 31 December 2015, she gave birth to their first child. The couple have two daughters, Lóa and Jari. They live in Iceland.
