= Scratch and Bite =

Studio album by Treat
- Released: 24 February 1985
- Recorded: Polar Studios, Stockholm, Sweden 1983–1984
- Genre: Hard rock
- Length: 43:49
- Label: Mercury
- Producer: Erik Olhester

Treat chronology
Scratch and Bite (1985)	The Pleasure Principle (1986)

Singles from Scratch & Bite
- 1. "Too Wild" Released: 1984; 2. "You Got Me" Released: 1984

Professional ratings
Review scores
Source	Rating
Kerrang!	3.5/5 stars
Martin Popoff	3/10 stars

Scratch and Bite is the Debut studio album by the Swedish rock band Treat. It was released on 24 February 1985

== Track listing ==
1. "Changes" – 3:41
2. "Scratch and Bite" – 4:13
3. "Get You on the Run" – 5:26
4. "Hidin'" – 4:49
5. "Too Wild" – 3:31
6. "We Are One" – 6:32
7. "No Room for Strangers" – 4:35
8. "You Got Me" – 4:46
9. "Run With the Fire" – 3:45

== Personnel ==
- Robert Ernlund – vocals
- Anders Wikstrom – guitars, keyboards, background vocals
- Leif "Lillen" Liljegren – guitars, background vocals
- Ken "Siwan" Siewertson – bass
- Mats "Dalton" Dahlberg – drums
