= New Arrival =

Studio album (reissue) by A-Teens
- Released: 27 January 2003
- Recorded: 2001–2002 in Sweden
- Genres: Pop; teen pop; Euro-pop
- Length: 46:10
- Label: Stockholm
- Producers: Grizzly; Tysper; Marcus Black; Habolin; Jansson; Anders Hansson; Chris Nelson; Tobias Lindell; Peter Björklund; Jones; J. Boogie; Mark Hammond; Jan Kask; Peter Mansson

A-Teens chronology
Pop 'til You Drop! (2002)	New Arrival (2003)	Greatest Hits (2004)

Singles from New Arrival
- 1. "Floorfiller" Released: 14 October 2002; 2. "A Perfect Match" Released: 17 March 2003

Professional ratings
Review scores
Source	Rating
laut.de	link (German)

New Arrival is the reissue of the third studio album by the A-Teens, Pop 'til You Drop! (2002). It was released in January 2003, six months after the release of its parent album. As Pop 'til You Drop! was only released in North America and Argentina, the album was marketed as the group's third album outside of these territories.

The album consists of seven songs previously released on Pop 'til You Drop! along with six new previously unreleased songs. The album also includes the group's 2001 single Heartbreak Lullaby. The album title is a reference and dedication to ABBA's 1976 fourth studio album, Arrival.

== Background ==
Marie said, "We wanted to present a totally new album for the European market, because some of our hard core fans already imported Pop 'til You Drop!, so we wanted to give them something new". The album includes the bonus tracks "Can't Help Falling in Love" (also included in Pop 'til You Drop! and on the soundtrack of Lilo & Stitch) and the ballad version of "Heartbreak Lullaby". The Japanese edition of the album includes the Pop 'til You Drop! song "Hi and Goodbye".

The album features a number of cover songs. Notably, Murray Head's "One Night in Bangkok" was recorded, originally composed by ABBA members Benny Andersson and Björn Ulvaeus along with Tim Rice. Other covers featured on the album are Shirley & Company's "Shame, Shame, Shame" and The Box Tops' "The Letter".

The A-Teens were involved in the writing of this album and participated in designing the artwork. The first single "Floorfiller" was released in October 2002 in Europe. In Sweden, the album reached number four on the albums chart. The album was released in the summer of 2003 in Germany with minimal success.

== Track listing ==
No.	Title	Writer(s)	Length
1.	"Floorfiller"	Gustav Jonsson; Markus Sepehrmanesh; Tommy Tysper	3:13
2.	"Have a Little Faith in Me"	Marcus Sjöberg; Johan Becker; Leif Larson	3:03
3.	"Shame Shame Shame"	Sylvia Robinson	2:52
4.	"Let Your Heart Do All the Talking"	Jonsson; Sepehrmanesh; Tysper	3:24
5.	"A Perfect Match"	Robert Habolin; Mats Jansson; Sepehrmanesh	3:00
6.	"The Letter"	Wayne Thompson	2:55
7.	"Cross My Heart"	Jonsson; Sepehrmanesh; Tysper; Marie Serneholt	3:35
8.	"In the Blink of an Eye"	Peter Björklund; Tobias Lindell; Serneholt	3:30
9.	"School's Out" (feat. Alice Cooper)	Vincent Furnier; Dennis Dunaway; Michael Bruce; Neal Smith	3:02
10.	"Closer to Perfection"	Alexandra Talomaa	3:10
11.	"Shangri-La"	Björklund; Lindell; Amit Paul	3:14
12.	"One Night in Bangkok"	Benny Andersson; Björn Ulvaeus; Tim Rice	3:31
13.	"Can't Help Falling in Love"	George David Weiss; Hugo Peretti; Luigi Creatore	3:05
14.	"Heartbreak Lullaby" (ballad version)	Jan Kask; Peter Mansson; Cathy Dennis	4:08

Japan edition bonus track
No.	Title	Writer(s)	Length
15.	"Hi and Goodbye"	Fredrik Thomander; Anders Wikström	4:13

- Tracks 1, 4, 7–10, 13, 15 previously released on Pop 'Til You Drop! (2002).
- Track 14 previously released on Heartbreak Lullaby (Maxi Single) (2001).
- Track 9 has an alternative ending from the previous release on Pop 'Til You Drop! (2002).

== Weekly charts ==
Chart (2003)	Peak position
German Albums (Offizielle Top 100)	95
Swedish Albums (Sverigetopplistan)	4
Swiss Albums (Schweizer Hitparade)	91
