= Iconic (A-Teens song) =

Single by A-Teens
- Released: 30 January 2026
- Length: 2:58
- Label: Universal Music Sweden
- Songwriters: Dino Medanhodzic; Thomas G:son; Jimmy Jansson; Moa Carlebecker; Lina Hansson
- Producers: Thomas G:son; Jimmy Jansson

A-Teens singles chronology
"I Promised Myself" (2004)	"Iconic" (2026)	"You Got the Look" (2026)

Lyric video
- "Iconic" on YouTube

"Iconic" is a song by the Swedish pop group A-Teens, released as a single on 30 January 2026. The song was performed in Melodifestivalen 2026. It qualified for the final. It debuted at number one in Sweden. "Iconic" is the group's first single in over twenty years.

== Charts ==
Chart performance
Chart (2026)	Peak position
Sweden (Sverigetopplistan)	1
UK Singles Sales (OCC)	33
UK Singles Downloads (OCC)	28

== Certifications ==
Certifications for "Iconic"
Region	Certification	Certified units/sales
Sweden (GLF)	Gold	6,000,000^{†}
^{‡} Sales+streaming figures based on certification alone.^{†} Streaming-only figures based on certification alone.

== Release history ==
Release history
Date	Format(s)	Label	Ref.
30 January 2026	Digital download; streaming	Universal Music Sweden	
