= Teen Spirit (album) =

Studio album by A-Teens
- Released: 26 February 2001
- Recorded: August–December 2000
- Genre: Pop
- Length: 43:29
- Label: Stockholm
- Producers: Grizzly; Tysper; RedOne; J. Boogie; Flame; Fredrick Thomander; Anders Wikström; Tobias Lindell; Peter Björklund; Thomas & Hugo; Thomas Jansson; Jan Kask; Peter Manson; Sir Martin; Huma; D. Papalexis; Taysir

A-Teens chronology
The ABBA Generation Remix (2001)	Teen Spirit (2001)	Pop 'til You Drop! (2002)

Alternative covers
- US edition

- Thailand edition

Singles from Teen Spirit
- 1. "Upside Down" Released: 20 November 2000; 2. "Halfway Around the World" Released: 12 March 2001; 3. "Sugar Rush" Released: 18 June 2001

Teen Spirit is the second studio album by the Swedish pop group A-Teens. It was released on 26 February 2001 by Stockholm Records. It was the group's first album of original material.

Three singles were released from the album, "Upside Down", "Halfway Around the World" and "Sugar Rush". A new version of the album including bonus tracks was released on 21 January 2002 in Scandinavia, Germany and Mexico. While not repeating the same level of success as their first album, the album went on to sell over 1.5 million copies, despite receiving poor reviews from critics.

== Reception ==
=== Critical reception ===
Professional ratings
Review scores
Source	Rating
AllMusic	2/5 stars
Billboard	(Mixed)
Laut	2/5 stars
Robert Christgau	(dud)
Rolling Stone	(Negative)
Sonicnet	2.5/5 stars
Wall of Sound	(40/100)

In a mixed review of the album, Billboard said that the album's tracks "range in quality from guilty pleasures to already-dated clunkers". The review was positive towards the tracks "Bouncing Off the Ceiling (Upside Down)" and "…To the Music" but overall described the album "a collection of more misses than hits". Writing for AllMusic, Jon Azpiri gave the album two out of five stars, and wrote: "instead of blatantly ripping off ABBA, they choose to imitate the trademark sound of ubiquitous Swedish pop super-producer Max Martin". Laut gave the album two out of five stars, criticizing the music’s similarities to recent hits by 'NSync, the Backstreet Boys and Britney Spears, but said, "At least the happy mood is still reminiscent of ABBA."

In a negative review, J.R. Griffin of Rolling Stone said that "without the nostalgic ABBA tunes on their side, the A-Teens have demoted themselves to the level of S Club 7, a younger Ace of Base and god-forbid, Aqua." He wrote that the music would only appeal to very young listeners. Writing for Sonicnet, Paul Gaita gave the album two and a half out of five stars, and said that if the group "intend to make good on the threat of their final track and come "Back for More," they'll need to work twice as hard to dispel both the ghosts of ABBA and this new straight-outta-IKEA personality as well." Writing for Wall of Sound, Gary Graff also criticized the similarities between the album's production and recent Max Martin produced efforts and gave the album a score of 40 out of 100. He praised group members Amit and Dhani for taking a more prominent role on the album.

=== Commercial performance ===
The album peaked at No. 2 in Sweden on the Sverigetopplistan Albums Top 60 chart, No. 18 in Austria on the Ö3 Austria Top 40 Top Albums chart, No. 33 in Finland on the Official Finnish Charts Top 50 Albums chart, No. 5 in Germany on the GfK Entertainment Top 100 Albums chart, No. 5 in the Netherlands on the Dutch Top 40, No. 37 in Norway on the VG-lista Top 40 Albums chart, No. 13 in Switzerland on the Swiss Hitparade Top 100 Albums chart, and No. 50 in the United States on the Billboard 200.

The album was certified Gold in Sweden and the United States.

== Track listing ==
No.	Title	Writer(s)	Length
1.	"Upside Down"	Gustav Jonsson, Markus Reza Sepehrmanesh, Tommy Tysper	3:14
2.	"...To the Music"	Flame (David Clewett), Rebecca Hortlund, J. Boogie (Calanit Ledani), Nadir Khayat	3:22
3.	"Halfway Around the World"	Jonsson, Sepehrmanesh, Tysper	3:41
4.	"Firefly"	Fredrik Thomander, Anders Wikström	3:07
5.	"Sugar Rush"	Thomander, Wikström	3:03
6.	"Rockin'"	Sigurd Rosnes	3:27
7.	"Around the Corner of Your Eye"	Thomander, Wikström	4:12
8.	"Slammin' Kinda Love"	Jan Kask, Peter Mansson	3:04
9.	"All My Love"	Leif Sundin, Thomas Jansson	3:17
10.	"For All That I Am"	Andreas Claeson, John Hjalmarsson, Johan Folke Norberg	3:19
11.	"That's What (It's All About)"	Stefan Nee, Tysper	3:17
12.	"Morning Light"	Martin Eriksson, Kristian Lundin, Johan Ekdahl	3:10
13.	"Back for More"	Thomander, Wikström	3:13

Europe and UK edition bonus tracks
No.	Title	Writer(s)	Length
14.	"Mamma Mia"	Benny Andersson, Björn Ulvaeus	3:47
15.	"Super Trouper"	Andersson, Ulvaeus, Stig Anderson	3:52

Japan edition bonus track
No.	Title	Writer(s)	Length
14.	"Can't Stop the Pop"	LaMuerte, Sepehrmanesh, Degiorgio	3:00

North America Target and Walmart edition bonus track
No.	Title	Writer(s)	Length
14.	"Don't Even Know Your Name"	Thomander, Wikström	3:46

Thailand edition bonus tracks
No.	Title	Writer(s)	Length
14.	"Upside Down" (Grzzly/Tysper Radio Remix)	Jonsson, Sepehrmanesh, Tysper	3:50
15.	"Halfway Around the World" (M12 Massive Club Mix)	Jonsson, Sepehrmanesh, Tysper	6:56
16.	"Sugar Rush" (M12 Remix)	Thomander, Wikström	6:25
17.	"Give It Up"	RedOne, Nanna	3:42

Teen Spirit - New Version bonus tracks
No.	Title	Writer(s)	Length
14.	"Heartbreak Lullaby" (Ray Hedges 7" Mix)	Jan Kask, Peter Mansson, Cathy Dennis	4:06
15.	"Don't Even Know Your Name"	Thomander, Wikström	3:46
16.	"Can't Stop the Pop"	LaMuerte, Sepehrmanesh, Degiorgio	3:00
17.	"Give It Up"	RedOne, Nanna	3:42

- The track "Upside Down" was renamed "Bouncing Off the Ceiling (Upside Down)" on North American pressings of the album.
- The track "Morning Light" is a cover of a song by E-Type from the album Last Man Standing.

== Charts ==
=== Weekly charts ===
Chart (2001)	Peak position
Austrian Albums (Ö3 Austria)	18
Danish Albums (Hitlisten)	30
Dutch Albums (Album Top 100)	42
European Top 100 Albums	13
Finnish Albums (Suomen virallinen lista)	33
German Albums (Offizielle Top 100)	5
Norwegian Albums (VG-lista)	37
Swedish Albums (Sverigetopplistan)	2
Swiss Albums (Schweizer Hitparade)	13
US Billboard 200	50

=== Year-end charts ===
Chart (2001)	Position
Swedish Albums (Sverigetopplistan)	68

=== Swedish vinyl charts ===
Chart (2026)	Position
Swedish Vinyl Albums (Sverigetopplistan)	1

=== Swedish album charts ===
Chart (2026)	Position
Swedish Albums (Sverigetopplistan)	4

== Certifications and sales ==
Region	Certification	Certified units/sales
Argentina (CAPIF)	Gold	20,000^{^}
Chile	Gold	15,000
Sweden (GLF)	Gold	40,000^{^}
United States (RIAA)	Gold	500,000^{^}
^{^} Shipments figures based on certification alone.

== Release history ==
Date	Region	Format	Label	Ref.
21 February 2001	Japan	CD	Stockholm	
26 February 2001	Sweden	CD	Stockholm	
27 February 2001	North America	CD; cassette	Stockholm; MCA	
29 October 2001	United Kingdom	CD; cassette	Stockholm	
