= Heartbreak Lullaby =

2001 single by A-Teens

Single by A-Teens

from the album The Princess Diaries
- B-side: "I Wish It Could Be Christmas Everyday"
- Released: 3 December 2001
- Length: 4:07 (Ray Hedges 7-inch mix/radio edit); 4:08 (ballad version/album version); 4:06 (single mix)
- Label: Universal Music Group
- Songwriters: Cathy Dennis; Jan Kask; Peter Mansson
- Producers: Jan Kask; Peter Mansson

A-Teens singles chronology
"Sugar Rush" (2001)	"Heartbreak Lullaby" (2001)	"Can't Help Falling in Love" (2002)

Audio video
- "Heartbreak Lullaby" on YouTube

Heartbreak Lullaby is a single by the Swedish pop group A-Teens for the Princess Diaries movie soundtrack in Europe and Asia. The song was written by Jan Kask, Peter Mansson and Cathy Dennis. The song reached number six in Sweden and number 77 in Germany.

The version included on the soundtrack and used in the music video for the song is the "Ray Hedges 7-inch Mix". In 2002, the song was included on a reissue of the group's second album, Teen Spirit. The "ballad version" of the song was later included on their album New Arrival (2003). The single also contains a cover version of "I Wish It Could Be Christmas Everyday" by the English glam rock band Wizzard.

== Music video ==
The video was filmed in Germany and features scenes from the movie The Princess Diaries.

== Releases ==
European 2-track CD single
No.	Title	Writer(s)	Length
1.	"Heartbreak Lullaby" (Ray Hedges 7-inch remix)	Cathy Dennis, Jan Kask, Peter Mansson	4:07
2.	"I Wish It Could Be Christmas Everyday" (Wizzard cover)	Roy Wood	3:19

All tracks are written by Cathy Dennis, Jan Kask and Peter Mansson, except where noted.

European and South-African CD Maxi
No.	Title	Writer(s)	Length
1.	"Heartbreak Lullaby" (Ray Hedges 7-inch remix)		4:07
2.	"Heartbreak Lullaby" (ballad/album version)		4:08
3.	"Heartbreak Lullaby" (Europop remix)		3:35
4.	"Heartbreak Lullaby" (Techno Earthbound mix)		4:14
5.	"I Wish It Could Be Christmas Everyday" (Wizzard cover)	Roy Wood	3:19

== Charts ==
=== Weekly charts ===
Chart (2002)	Peak position
Germany (GfK)	77
Sweden (Sverigetopplistan)	6
Switzerland (Schweizer Hitparade)	97

=== Year-end charts ===
Chart (2002)	Position
Sweden (Hitlistan)	55

== Release history ==
Region	Date	Format	Label	Ref.
Europe	3 December 2001	CD	Stockholm	
