= Dreamhunter (album) =

Studio album by Treat
- Released: 1987
- Recorded: Wisseloord Studios, Hilversum, Holland
- Genre: Hard rock
- Length: 45:01
- Label: Mercury
- Producer: Albert Boekholt

Treat chronology
The Pleasure Principle (1986)	Dreamhunter (1987)	Organized Crime (1989)

Singles from Dreamhunter
- 1. "Best of Me" Released: 1987; 2. "You're the One I Want" Released: 1987; 3. "World of Promises" Released: 1988

Dreamhunter is the third studio album by the Swedish hard rock band Treat, released in 1987.

The band had only minor success with the album, but nevertheless managed to join the Monsters of Rock Tour 1988 in support of it. During the recording, drummer Leif Sundin left the band and was replaced by Jamie Borger, who would go on to be featured on every subsequent album.

== Track listing ==
1. "Sole Survivor" (Anders Wikström, Robert Ernlund) - 5:05
2. "You're the One I Want" (Wikström, Ernlund) - 4:08
3. "Take Me on Your Wings" (Wikström, Ernlund) - 4:06
4. "Best of Me" (Wikström, Ernlund) - 5:26
5. "Dancing on the Edge" (Wikström, Ernlund) - 4:33
6. "Outlaw" (Wikström, Ernlund) - 4:52
7. "World of Promises" (Wikström, Ernlund) - 4:00
8. "One Way to Glory" (Wikström, Ernlund, Jamie Borger) - 4:36
9. "Save Yourself" (Wikström, Ernlund) - 4:36
10. "The Winner" (Wikström, Ernlund) - 3:39

== Personnel ==
Band members

- Anders Wikström – guitars, keyboards
- Jamie Borger – drums, percussion
- Lillen Liljegren – guitars
- Robert Ernlund – lead vocals
- Ken Siewertson – bass

Production

- Albert Boekholt – producer, engineer, mixing
- Albert Hartwig – assistant engineer
- Atti Bauw – fairlight programing
- Walter Hirsch – photography
