= Upside Down (A-Teens song) =

2000 single by A-Teens

Single by A-Teens

from the album Teen Spirit
- B-side: "Super Trouper"
- Released: 20 November 2000
- Recorded: August 2000
- Length: 3:36 (album version); 3:14 (radio edit/single mix)
- Label: Stockholm
- Songwriters: Gustav Jonsson; Markus Sepehrmanesh; Tommy Tysper
- Producers: Grizzly; Tommy Tysper

A-Teens singles chronology
"Dancing Queen" (2000)	"Upside Down" (2000)	"Halfway Around the World" (2001)

Music video
- "Upside Down" on YouTube

"Upside Down" (titled "Bouncing off the Ceiling (Upside Down)" in the United States and Canada) is a song by Swedish pop music group A-Teens, released as the first single from their second album, Teen Spirit (2001). A DVD single of the song was released in the United States to coincide with both the single's release and Teen Spirit's release, and contains the music videos for both the title track and Mamma Mia from The ABBA Generation.

== Production and release ==
After the intense promotion in the United States in August 2000, the band went back to the studio to start working on their second album. The song was first announced at the Viva Music Awards in September 2000. The song was the first time the band released an original song instead of a cover, and the song was produced by the hit makers Grizzly and Tysper.

== Commercial reception ==
The single reached platinum during its third week of release in their homeland, and by early 2001, "Upside Down" had peaked at number two and sold over 120,000 copies in Sweden, earning a double-platinum certification. The song became the band's biggest hit in the United Kingdom, selling 3,711 copies during its first day and peaking at number 10 by the end of the week. The song received 8/10 Stars on UK Yahoo Music Reviews. "Upside Down" had a name change in the United States and Canada to "Bouncing Off the Ceiling (Upside Down)". The song reached number 93 on the US Billboard Hot 100.

== Music video ==
The music video shows the band in an alternative world where everything is "upside down," and tells the story of one student who is in love with another student so much that they can't focus on their school studies; thus turning their lives "upside down." The dancing routine was choreographed by Wade Robson. The video reached number-one on several countdowns around the world. It was 2001's 25th most played video of MTV Mexico.

== Track listings ==
Swedish and European CD single

1. "Upside Down" (radio version) – 3:14
2. "Upside Down" (sing-along version) – 3:14

European maxi-CD single

1. "Upside Down" – 3:14
2. "Upside Down" (Grizzly/Tysper radio remix) – 3:50
3. "Upside Down" (Grizzly/Tysper extended remix) – 4:46
4. "Upside Down" (JS16 Remix) – 6:34

UK CD single

1. "Upside Down" (radio version) – 3:14
2. "Upside Down" (Almighty 7-inch edit) – 4:18
3. "Upside Down" (JS16 Remix) – 6:34
4. "Upside Down" (karaoke version) – 3:14
5. "Upside Down" (CD-ROM video)

UK cassette single

1. "Upside Down" – 3:14
2. "Mamma Mia" (radio version) – 3:14

US CD single

1. "Bouncing Off the Ceiling (Upside Down)" – 3:14
2. "Super Trouper" – 3:50
3. "Bouncing Off the Ceiling (Upside Down)" (video)

US DVD single

1. "Bouncing Off the Ceiling" (video)
2. "Mamma Mia" (video)

== Charts ==
=== Weekly charts ===
Chart (2000–2001)	Peak position
Austria (Ö3 Austria Top 40)	34
Belgium (Ultratop 50 Wallonia)	28
Europe (Eurochart Hot 100)	25
Germany (GfK)	10
Hungary (Mahasz)	18
Ireland (IRMA)	40
Netherlands (Dutch Top 40 Tipparade)	1
Netherlands (Single Top 100)	28
Portugal (AFP)	7
Scottish Singles Sales (Official Charts)	6
Spain (Promusicae)	15
Sweden (Sverigetopplistan)	2
Switzerland (Schweizer Hitparade)	7
UK Singles (Official Charts)	10
US Billboard Hot 100	93
US Maxi-Singles Sales (Billboard) with "To the Music"	6

=== Year-end charts ===
Chart (2000)	Position
Sweden (Hitlistan)	19

Chart (2001)	Position
Europe (Eurochart Hot 100)	94
Germany (Media Control)	81
Sweden (Hitlistan)	39
Switzerland (Schweizer Hitparade)	80

== Certifications and sales ==
Region	Certification	Certified units/sales
Sweden (GLF)	2× Platinum	60,000^{^}
^{^} Shipments figures based on certification alone.

== Release history ==
Region	Date	Format(s)	Label(s)	Ref.
Europe	20 November 2000	CD; cassette	Stockholm	
United States	12 December 2000	CD	MCA	
Japan	21 February 2001	CD	Stockholm	
United States	19 March 2001	Contemporary hit radio	MCA	
United Kingdom	14 May 2001	CD; cassette	Stockholm	
