= I Promised Myself =

1990 song by Nick Kamen

- 1990 CD maxi single

Single by Nick Kamen

from the album Move Until We Fly
- Released: 1990
- Recorded: 1990
- Genre: Synth-pop; pop rock
- Length: 3:55
- Label: Atlantic
- Songwriter: Nick Kamen
- Producers: Mike Paxman; Paul Muggleton

Nick Kamen singles chronology
"Don't Hold Out" (1989)	"I Promised Myself" (1990)	"Oh How Happy" (1990)

Nick Kamen singles chronology
"We'll Never Lose What We Have Found" (1992)	"I Promised Myself 2004" (2004)

Music video
- "I Promised Myself" on YouTube

Alternative cover
- 2004 version

"I Promised Myself" is a song written and originally performed by British English singer Nick Kamen. Originally released on his album Move Until We Fly (1990), it was released as a single in the same year and, as a remix in 2004. The original version achieved success in numerous countries, including Austria and Sweden where it topped the charts, although did not reach the top 40 in his native country. It has been covered multiple times by artists such as Dead or Alive, A-Teens and Basshunter.

== Track listings ==
CD maxi single
No.	Title	Length
1.	"I Promised Myself"
2.	"You Are"
3.	"Don't Hold Out"
4.	"Tell Me"

7-inch single (1990)
No.	Title	Length
1.	"I Promised Myself"	3:55
2.	"You Are"	3:58
Total length:		7:53

12-inch maxi single (1990)
No.	Title	Length
1.	"I Promised Myself (Extended Version)"	5:40
2.	"I Promised Myself (Single Version)"	3:55
3.	"You Are"	3:58
Total length:		13:33

I Promised Myself 2004 CD single version (2004)
No.	Title	Artist	Length
1.	"I Promised Myself 2004 (Radio Edit)"	Nick Kamen	3:54
2.	"I Promised Myself 2004 (Extended Mix)"	Nick Kamen	7:05
3.	"On a Wave"	Wilde & Janssens	6:32
Total length:			17:31

== Charts ==
=== Weekly charts ===
Weekly chart performance for "I Promised Myself"
Chart (1990–1991)	Peak position
Austria (Ö3 Austria Top 40)	1
Belgium (Ultratop 50 Flanders)	5
Denmark (Hitlisten)	7
Europe (Eurochart Hot 100 Singles)	3
Finland (Suomen virallinen lista)	9
France (SNEP)	11
Italy (Musica e dischi)	8
Italy Airplay (Music & Media)	3
Netherlands (Dutch Top 40)	6
Netherlands (Single Top 100)	4
Spain (AFYVE)	2
Sweden (Sverigetopplistan)	1
Switzerland (Schweizer Hitparade)	3
UK Singles (Official Charts)	50
West Germany (GfK)	5

Weekly chart performance for "I Promised Myself 2004"
Chart (2004)	Peak position
Belgium (Ultratop 50 Flanders)	6
Belgium (Ultratip Bubbling Under Wallonia)	9
Netherlands (Dutch Top 40)	35
Netherlands (Single Top 100)	42

=== Year-end charts ===
Year-end chart performance for "I Promised Myself"
Chart (1990)	Position
Austria (Ö3 Austria Top 40)	3
Belgium (Ultratop 50 Flanders)	2
Europe (Eurochart Hot 100 Singles)	15
Europe (European Airplay Top 50)	5
Europe (European Hit Radio)	4
Germany (Media Control)	7
Netherlands (Dutch Top 40)	26
Netherlands (Single Top 100)	20
Switzerland (Schweizer Hitparade)	3
Sweden (Topplistan)	6

Year-end chart performance for "I Promised Myself 2004"
Chart (2004)	Position
Belgium (Ultratop 50 Flanders)	34

=== Decade-end charts ===
Chart (1990–1999)	Rank
Austria (Ö3 Austria Top 40)	71

== Certifications ==
Certifications for "I Promised Myself"
Region	Certification	Certified units/sales
Austria (IFPI Austria)	Gold	25,000^{*}
Germany (BVMI)	Gold	250,000^{^}
Sweden (GLF)	Gold	25,000^{^}
^{*} Sales figures based on certification alone.^{^} Shipments figures based on certification alone.

== A-Teens version ==
"I Promised Myself"

Single by A-Teens

from the album Greatest Hits
- Released: 4 April 2024
- Recorded: 2004
- Genre: Pop; Europop; dance
- Length: 3:32
- Label: Universal Music Group
- Songwriter: Nick Kamen
- Producers: Grizzly; Tysper

A-Teens singles chronology
"A Perfect Match" (2003)	"I Promised Myself" (2024)	"Iconic" (2026)

Music video
- "I Promised Myself" on YouTube

"I Promised Myself" was covered by Swedish pop group A-Teens and released on 28 April 2004 as the group's final single until 2026. It was one of three new songs to be included on their 2004 compilation album, Greatest Hits. It was produced by Grizzly and Tysper.

=== Music video ===
The video was directed by Gustav Johnson and was filmed in Sweden and shows the band's members images inserted in scenes from past videos, so that they appear to be interacting with the teenagers they were before.

=== Track listings ===
European 2-track CD single (2004)
No.	Title	Length
1.	"I Promised Myself (Radio Version)"	3:32
2.	"I Promised Myself (Extended Version)"	4:43
Total length:		8:15

European CD maxi single (2004)
No.	Title	Length
1.	"I Promised Myself (Radio Version)"	3:32
2.	"I Promised Myself (Extended Version)"	4:43
3.	"I Promised Myself (The Attic Radio Version)"	3:28
4.	"I Promised Myself (The Attic Remix)"	5:55
Total length:		17:38

=== Weekly charts ===
Weekly chart performance for "I Promised Myself"
Chart (2004)	Peak position
Sweden (Sverigetopplistan)	2

=== Year-end charts ===
Year-end chart performance for "I Promised Myself"
Chart (2004)	Position
Sweden (Hitlistan)	40

== Basshunter version ==
"I Promised Myself"

Single by Basshunter

from the album Bass Generation
- Released: 30 November 2009
- Recorded: 2009
- Genre: Eurodance
- Length: 2:38 (Radio Edit)
- Label: Warner Music Sweden; Hard2Beat Records; Ministry of Sound; Ultra Records
- Songwriter: Nick Kamen
- Producers: Basshunter, Scott Simons

Basshunter singles chronology
"Every Morning" (2009)	"I Promised Myself" (2009)	"Saturday" (2010)

Music video
- "I Promised Myself" on YouTube

Professional ratings
Review scores
Source	Rating
BBC	3/5 stars

Swedish musician Basshunter covered the song on his fifth studio album, Bass Generation. The single was released on 30 November 2009. It was produced by Basshunter. (Note: According to the Bass Generation booklet, the song was produced by Basshunter and Scott Simons.) "I Promised Myself" is two minutes and 38 seconds long and has a tempo of 150 beats per minute. Basshunter describing his cover of "I Promised Myself" said that it has similar setup to "Now You're Gone" with improved bass drums and bassline and it is more rhythmic. Grant Black from BBC describing the song said that it has no sign of a verse, and it sounds like previous Basshunter songs. In his opinion song with this sentiment should not have a sniff of a dance backing but he also understood that Basshunter can't make songs without bass. He appreciated that Basshunter really does try to sing, and he kind of pulls it off.

=== Music video ===
Music video for "I Promised Myself" was directed in Málaga by Alex Herron. Music video was released by Hard2Beat Records on 15 October 2009. Anders Anderson was assistant director and Maz Makhani was camera operator. On 19 November, the Pete Hammond Remix was released.

In the music video, Basshunter goes through all the trouble of finding Aylar Lie after receiving a voicemail from a friend telling him that he needs to get to the hospital. Whilst in the taxi to the hospital he looks out the window and then down at his phone in his hands that shows pictures of Aylar Lie and then recalls memories of them together. The taxi then gets stuck in traffic so Basshunter starts walking to the hospital. He then arrives at the hospital and asks where he can find Aylar and goes in search for her whilst remembering the last night he saw her. He finds the room, opens the door but then finds her with her ex-boyfriend, Lucas, from previous music videos.

=== Track listings ===
Digital download (30 November 2009)
No.	Title	Length
1.	"I Promised Myself (Radio Edit)"	2:38
2.	"I Promised Myself (Pete Hammond Edit)"	3:11
Total length:		5:49

Digital download (30 November 2009)
No.	Title	Length
1.	"I Promised Myself (Radio Edit)"	2:38
2.	"I Promised Myself (Pete Hammond Remix)"	6:55
3.	"I Promised Myself (Hixxy Mix)"	5:34
4.	"I Promised Myself (Bad Behaviour Remix)"	5:09
5.	"I Promised Myself (7th Heaven Remix)"	6:04
6.	"I Promised Myself (Extended Mix)"	4:04
7.	"I Promised Myself (Pete Hammond Edit)"	3:11
8.	"I Promised Myself (7th Heaven Edit)"	2:55
Total length:		36:30

=== Charts ===
Chart performance for "I Promised Myself"
Chart (2009–2010)	Peak position
ERROR in "CIS": Invalid position: 208. Expected number 1–200 or dash (–).
Germany (Deutsche-DJ-Playlist)	89
UK Singles (Official Charts)	94
UK Dance (Official Charts)	9
UK Indie (Official Charts)	8

== Other versions ==
- In 1999, it was covered and released as a single by Lars A. Fredriksen.
- In 2000, it was covered and released as a single by John Davies, reaching number 46 in Germany and number 49 in Switzerland. It was also released on the album Fragile, by Dead or Alive.
- In 2007, it was covered and released as a single by José Galisteo.
- In 2009, it was covered and released as a single by DJ Antoine, reaching number 40 in Switzerland.
- In 2014, a German Schlager version was released titled "Pommes mit Senf (I Promised Myself)" by Robert Haag and Markus Becker.
- In 2020, it was covered and released as a single by Alfredo Nini, Italian DJ and producer.
