= Dancing Queen =

1976 single by ABBA

- Artwork for Scandinavian releases, also used for other releases in different layouts

Single by ABBA

from the album Arrival
- B-side: "That's Me"
- Released: 16 August 1976 (Sweden)
- Recorded: August–December 1975
- Studio: Glen; Metronome; KMH
- Genre: Eurodisco; Europop
- Length: 3:50
- Label: Polar; Epic; Atlantic
- Songwriters: Benny Andersson; Björn Ulvaeus; Stig Anderson
- Producers: Benny Andersson; Björn Ulvaeus

ABBA singles chronology
"Fernando" (1976)	"Dancing Queen" (1976)	"Money, Money, Money" (1976)

Music video
- "Dancing Queen" on YouTube

"Dancing Queen" is a song by Swedish pop group ABBA, released as the lead single from their fourth studio album, Arrival (1976). It was written by Benny Andersson, Björn Ulvaeus and Stig Anderson. Andersson and Ulvaeus also produced the song. "Dancing Queen" was released as a single in Sweden in August 1976, followed by a UK release and the rest of Europe. It was a worldwide hit, and is widely considered to be the band's signature song. It became ABBA's only number-one hit in the United States and topped the charts of 15 other countries, entering the top five in various others. In 2015, the song was inducted into the Grammy Hall of Fame.

Musically, "Dancing Queen" is a Europop version of American disco music. As disco music dominated the US charts, the group decided to follow the trend, replicating Phil Spector's Wall of Sound arrangements. Andersson and Ulvaeus have cited George McCrae's "Rock Your Baby" as a source of inspiration for the style of the song. The song alternates between "languid yet seductive verses" and a "dramatic chorus that ascends to heart-tugging high notes". It features keyboard lines by Andersson, which accentuate the melody's sophistication and classical complexity, while Ulvaeus and Andersson interlace many instrumental hooks in and out of the mix. Agnetha Fältskog and Anni-Frid Lyngstad's layered vocals have been noted for their dynamism, "[negotiating] the melody's many turns flawlessly." Lyrically, the song concerns a visit to the discothèque, but approaches the subject from the joy of dancing itself.

== Background and release ==
The backing track for "Dancing Queen" was recorded on 4 and 5 August 1975 at Glen Studio in the Stockholm suburb of Stocksund. The song had the working title "Boogaloo" and as the sessions progressed, Andersson and Ulvaeus found inspiration in the dance rhythm of George McCrae's "Rock Your Baby", as well as the drumming on Dr. John's 1972 album, Dr. John's Gumbo. The opening melody echoes "Sing My Way Home" by Delaney & Bonnie (from Motel Shot, 1971). Fältskog and Lyngstad recorded the vocals at Metronome Studio in Stockholm on 10 September, and a string overdub arranged by Sven-Olof Walldoff followed two days later. On 3 December, drummer Roger Palm added a hi-hat overdub at KMH Studio.

During the sessions, Benny Andersson brought a tape home with the backing track on it and played it to Anni-Frid Lyngstad, who apparently started crying when listening. Lyngstad said, "I found the song so beautiful. It's one of those songs that goes straight to your heart". Agnetha Fältskog later said: "It's often difficult to know what will be a hit. The exception was 'Dancing Queen.' We all knew it was going to be massive."

While working on the lyrics, the first half of the second verse was scrapped: "Baby, baby, you're out of sight/hey, you're looking all right tonight/when you come to the party/listen to the guys/they've got the look in their eyes..." It survives in footage from a recording session.

The band (especially Andersson) wanted to release "Dancing Queen" as the follow-up single to "Mamma Mia" but their manager, Stig Anderson, insisted that the more sedate and folksy "Fernando" should be first, as he felt it would appeal to a broader audience and so was more likely to be a hit. Therefore, whilst "Dancing Queen" premiered on both German and Japanese television during the spring of 1976, the song did not appear on vinyl until later that summer, having had its first live and domestic performance on 18 June 1976 during an all-star gala staged by Kjerstin Dellert at the Royal Swedish Opera (and shown on Swedish TV) in honour of King Carl XVI Gustaf and his bride-to-be, Silvia Sommerlath, who were married the next day. For their 1980 Spanish-language compilation-album Gracias Por La Música, ABBA recorded a Spanish version of "Dancing Queen", renamed "Reina Danzante", with Spanish lyrics provided by Buddy and Mary McCluskey. The track was retitled "La Reina Del Baile" when included on the compilation album ABBA Oro: Grandes Éxitos in the 1990s.

In 1993, in honour of Swedish Queen Silvia's 50th birthday, Anni-Frid Lyngstad was asked to perform "Dancing Queen" on stage, repeating ABBA's 1976 performance of the song at the pre-wedding gala for King Carl XVI Gustaf and Queen Silvia. Frida contacted the Real Group and together they did an a cappella version of the song on stage at the Royal Opera House in Stockholm, in front of the king and queen. The Swedish prime minister at the time, Ingvar Carlsson, was also in the audience that night and said it was an ingenious idea to perform "Dancing Queen" a cappella. The performance was recorded by Sveriges Television (SVT) and is included in the biographical documentary Frida – The DVD and the Real Group's 1994 compilation album Varför får man inte bara vara som man är. When King Carl Gustaf and Queen Silvia attended the Tramp nightclub in London, the King requested that the DJ would play "Dancing Queen" owing to its use shortly before their wedding as previously mentioned.

For the soundtrack of the 1994 Australian film Muriel's Wedding, songwriters Ulvaeus and Andersson allowed the use of "Dancing Queen" and other ABBA hits. "Dancing Queen" was among the ABBA songs included in Mamma Mia!, the jukebox musical first produced in 1999 and adapted into film in 2008, as well as the sequel, Mamma Mia! Here We Go Again (2018).

The first International Standard Musical Work Code was assigned in 1995 to "Dancing Queen"; the code is T-000.000.001-0.

== Critical reception ==
"Dancing Queen" received widespread critical acclaim upon release. According to Donald A. Guarisco of AllMusic, the track's "sincerity and sheer musicality have allowed it to outlast the disco boom and become a standard of dance-pop." The song's release also cemented ABBA as an international act and signified the beginning of the group's 'classic period', which would span the following four years. It has become a standard for dance divas like Carol Douglas and Kylie Minogue, and it has been covered numerous times by acts including Ireland's U2. The song has been adopted by the LGBT community and, according to Mojo magazine, remains one of the most ubiquitous "gay anthems". Billboard magazine found the theme of a person's greatest experience coming at a disco age 17 to be more substantive than most ABBA songs, and compared the vocal harmonies to The Mamas and the Papas. Cash Box said that the song is "backed by a strong upbeat, in keeping with the title" and "the hooks brought by lush vocal harmonies, as well as the reverb-soaked wall of sound that distinguishes this group, are present." Record World wrote that "the disco-styled treatment should make it a favorite [in the United States]."

== Chart performance ==
"Dancing Queen" was a worldwide No. 1 hit, topping the charts in more than a dozen countries including ABBA's native Sweden (where it spent 14 weeks at the top), Australia, Belgium, Brazil, Canada, West Germany, the United Kingdom, Ireland, Mexico, the Netherlands, New Zealand, Norway (where it charted for 32 weeks (VG-lista Top 10), making it the 11th best-performing single in that country), South Africa and Rhodesia. "Dancing Queen" also topped the charts in the United States, ABBA's only No. 1 on the Billboard Hot 100, and was a Top 5 hit in Austria, Finland, France and Switzerland. The song sold over three million copies. The track was the fourth biggest single of 1976 in the UK.

In the UK singles chart, "Dancing Queen" was the last of three consecutive chart-toppers for ABBA in 1976, following "Mamma Mia" and "Fernando" earlier in the year. The song was re-released in the UK in 1992, taking advantage of an ABBA revival sparked by the success of Erasure's Abba-esque EP. The re-issued "Dancing Queen" reached No. 16 in the UK in September 1992.

As of September 2021, it is ABBA's biggest song in the UK, being their only million-seller with 1.65 million chart sales, including 93 million streams since 2014. In 2023, it was listed as the 102nd best-selling single of all time in the UK.

The song re-entered the Swedish Sverigetopplistan in 2021 and 2024. In 2022 it was reported to be the fifth most profitable song in Sweden in 2021, and to have more than 19 million weekly streams on Spotify.

== Music video ==
The song was accompanied by a music video filmed in 1976 in Alexandra's discotheque in central Stockholm, Sweden directed by the Swedish film director Lasse Hallström. It features all four members of ABBA singing and performing to dancing club patrons. On 29 June 2025 at 19:24 UTC the music video on YouTube reached 1 billion views. The video was remastered in ultra-high definition in August 2021 to celebrate the 500 million view milestone.

== Legacy ==
In 2000, "Dancing Queen" came fourth in a Channel 4 television poll of "The 100 Greatest Number One Singles". It was chosen as No. 148 on the Recording Industry Association of America's Songs of the Century list. It was ranked No. 171 on Rolling Stone's 2004 list of "The 500 Greatest Songs of All Time", the only ABBA song on the list. That same year, it made VH1's "100 Greatest Dance Songs in Rock & Roll" at No. 97. Also in 2000, editors of Rolling Stone with MTV compiled a list of the best 100 pop songs; "Dancing Queen" placed 12th among songs of the 1970s. Billboard and Rolling Stone both ranked the song number one on their lists of the greatest ABBA songs. In 2023, it was ranked No. 2 on Billboard's list of "The 500 Best Pop Songs". On 9 November 2002, the results of a poll, "Top 50 Favourite UK #1's", was broadcast on Radio 2, celebrating the 50th anniversary of The Official UK Charts Company. 188,357 listeners voted and "Dancing Queen" came out at No. 8. On 5 December 2010, Britain's ITV broadcast the results of a poll to determine "The Nation's Favourite ABBA Song" in which "Dancing Queen" placed at No. 2. In 2009, the British performing rights group Phonographic Performance Limited celebrated its 75th anniversary by listing the 75 songs that have played most in Great Britain on the radio, in clubs and on jukeboxes. "Dancing Queen" was number eight on the list.

Former US presidential candidate John McCain named "Dancing Queen" as his favourite song in a top-10 list submitted to Blender magazine in August 2008. In August 2012, listeners to the 1970s-themed UK radio station "Smooth 70s" voted "Dancing Queen" as their favourite hit of the decade. In October 2014, the musical instrument insurer Musicguard carried out a survey determining "Dancing Queen" to be the United Kingdom's favourite "floorfiller". Unlike its closest competitors, "Billie Jean" by Michael Jackson (No. 2) and "Twist and Shout" by the Beatles (No. 3), it turned out to be very popular throughout the nation whereas the other two were strong regional favourites. In June 2015, "Dancing Queen" was inducted into the Recording Academy's Grammy Hall of Fame. Online music magazine Pitchfork positioned "Dancing Queen" at number 80 in its 2016 ranking of the 200 best songs of the 1970s. Reviewer Cameron Cook wrote it is "a song so confident in its structure that its starts from the middle of its chorus", adding that it "bottles the out-of-body euphoria that accompanies dancing for dancing's sake, with no agenda or motive other than pure joy." Eschewing the "disco" label sometimes attached to the track by latter-day critics, Cook called it "a pitch-perfect portrait of the hedonistic disco scene they were mimicking via their own, more down-to-Earth Europop".

In September 2016, The Guardian ran an article by Tim Jonze entitled "Why Abba's Dancing Queen is the best pop song ever". Jonze writes: "Dancing Queen is beautifully produced: catchy and euphoric, the perfect backdrop for a song that encapsulates the carefree bliss of youth". Several artists are cited as being influenced by the song, including Elvis Costello ("Oliver's Army"), MGMT ("Time to Pretend") and Chris Stein of Blondie ("Dreaming"). In 1993, Hong Kong singer Angela Pang covered this song in the Cantonese language. The British online music industry magazine NME placed "Dancing Queen" at number 27 in its 2018 listing of the top 100 songs of the 70s, reviewer Rebecca Schiller calling it "one of the greatest pop songs ever." In 2022, "Dancing Queen" received a BMI Million-Air award, having been played 6 million times on radio in the United States. Two years later, it was inducted into the Library of Congress's National Recording Registry along with all the other songs in Arrival. In October 2024, during the "Heavenly Harmony in Concert", singer Julie Anne San Jose held a concert featuring this song and other secular songs at the altar of the Nuestra Señora del Pilar Shrine and Parish in Mamburao, Occidental Mindoro. She, Parish Priest Fr. Carlito Meim Dimaano, and Sparkle GMA Artist Center then issued an apology. In 2025, Billboard ranked "Dancing Queen" number 76 in their list of "The 100 Greatest LGBTQ+ Anthems of All Time". In 2026, Collider ranked "Dancing Queen" number four on its list of the greatest number-one songs in the history of the Billboard Hot 100.

== Track listings ==
- 7" Vinyl
1. "Dancing Queen" – 3:52
2. "That's Me" – 3:15
- 1992 7" European re-issue
1. "Dancing Queen" – 3:52
2. "Lay All Your Love on Me" – 4:35
- 1992 12"/CD European re-issue
1. "Dancing Queen" – 3:52
2. "Lay All Your Love on Me" – 4:35
3. "The Day Before You Came" – 5:50
4. "Eagle" – 5:49
- 1992 12" US re-issue
1. "Dancing Queen" – 3:52
2. "Take a Chance on Me" – 4:04

== Personnel ==
ABBA

- Agnetha Fältskog – lead vocals and backing vocals
- Anni-Frid Lyngstad – lead vocals and backing vocals
- Björn Ulvaeus – electric guitar, backing vocals
- Benny Andersson – piano and synthesizer, backing vocals

Additional personnel

- Rutger Gunnarsson – bass guitar
- Roger Palm – drums, hi-hat
- Malando Gassama – tambourine, shaker
- Sven-Olof Walldoff – string arrangements
- Krzysztof Zdrzalka, Harry Teike, Sixten Strömvall, Lars Stegenberg, Bertil Orsin, Claes Nilsson, Gunnar Michols, Anders Dahl, Martin Bylund – violins
- Lars Brolin, Håkan Roos, Åke Arvinder – violas
- Hans-Göran Eketorp, Åke Olofsson – cellos

== Charts ==
=== Weekly charts ===
Weekly chart performance for "Dancing Queen"
Chart (1976–1977)	Peak position
Australia (Kent Music Report)	1
Austria (Ö3 Austria Top 40)	4
Belgium (Ultratop)	1
Canada (Steede Report)	2
Canada Top Singles (RPM)	1
Canada Adult Contemporary (RPM)	3
Czechoslovakia (Czechoslovakia Radio)	1
Denmark (Danmarks Radio)	1
Finland (Suomen virallinen lista)	9
France (SNEP)	4
Ireland (IRMA)	1
Italy (Musica e dischi)	11
Netherlands (Dutch Top 40)	1
Netherlands (Single Top 100)	1
New Zealand (RIANZ)	1
Norway (VG-lista)	1
Portugal (Portuguese Singles Chart)	1
South Africa (Springbok Radio)	1
Soviet Union (Soviet Singles Chart)	1
Sweden (Sverigetopplistan)	1
Switzerland (Schweizer Hitparade)	3
UK Singles (OCC)	1
US Billboard Hot 100	1
US Adult Contemporary (Billboard)	6
US Cash Box Top 100	1
West Germany (GfK)	1

1992 weekly chart performance for "Dancing Queen"
Chart (1992)	Peak position
Australia (ARIA)	28
Belgium (Ultratop)	16
Germany (Media Control)	22
Netherlands (Single Top 100)	24
New Zealand (RIANZ)	14
Norway (VG-lista)	5
Sweden (Sverigetopplistan)	15
Switzerland (Schweizer Hitparade)	6
UK Singles (OCC)	16
UK Airplay (Music Week)	22

2007 weekly chart performance for "Dancing Queen"
Chart (2007)	Peak position
CIS Airplay (TopHit)	108
Russia Airplay (TopHit)	104

2008 weekly chart performance for "Dancing Queen"
Chart (2008)	Peak position
Australia (ARIA)	58
UK Singles (OCC)	82

2014 weekly chart performance for "Dancing Queen"
Chart (2014)	Peak position
Japan Hot 100 (Billboard)	79

2021–2026 weekly chart performance for "Dancing Queen"
Chart (2021–2026)	Peak position
Canada Digital Song Sales (Billboard)	19
Global 200 (Billboard)	152
Japan Hot Overseas (Billboard Japan)	19
Netherlands (Single Top 100)	89
Sweden (Sverigetopplistan)	30
Switzerland (Schweizer Hitparade Top 100)	93
Switzerland (Schweizer Hitparade Streaming Charts Top 100)	84
US Dance Digital Song Sales (Billboard)	4

=== Year-end charts ===
1976 year-end chart performance for "Dancing Queen"
Chart (1976)	Rank
Australia (Kent Music Report)	3
Austria (Ö3)	19
New Zealand (RIANZ)	4
South Africa (Springbok Radio)	10
Switzerland (Schweizer Hitparade)	11
UK Singles (BMRB)	4
West Germany (GfK)	22

1977 year-end chart performance for "Dancing Queen"
Chart (1977)	Rank
Canada (RPM) Top Singles	5
US Billboard Hot 100	12
US Adult Contemporary (Billboard)	28
US Cash Box Top 100	3

== Certifications and sales ==
Certifications and sales for "Dancing Queen"
Region	Certification	Certified units/sales
Australia	—	300,000
Brazil (Pro-Música Brasil)	Gold	30,000^{‡}
Denmark (IFPI Danmark)	2× Platinum	180,000^{‡}
Germany (BVMI)	Platinum	600,000^{‡}
Ireland (IRMA)	Gold	50,000
Italy (FIMI) Sales since 2009	Platinum	100,000^{‡}
Japan Physical sales	—	350,000
Japan (RIAJ) PC download	Gold	100,000^{*}
Japan (RIAJ) Full-length ringtone	Gold	100,000^{*}
Kenya	—	10,000
Netherlands	—	150,000
New Zealand (RMNZ)	6× Platinum	180,000^{‡}
Portugal	—	20,000
Spain (Promusicae)	2× Platinum	120,000^{‡}
United Kingdom (BPI) Sales since 2010	4× Platinum	2,400,000^{‡}
United States (RIAA)	Gold	1,000,000^{^}
United States Digital	—	597,000
Yugoslavia	Silver	80,000
Summaries
Europe	—	3,000,000
Worldwide	—	4,000,000
^{*} Sales figures based on certification alone.^{^} Shipments figures based on certification alone.^{‡} Sales+streaming figures based on certification alone.

== A-Teens version ==
"Dancing Queen"

Single by A-Teens

from the album The ABBA Generation
- Released: March 2000
- Length: 3:52 (album version); 3:20 (UK radio edit)
- Label: Stockholm; MCA
- Songwriters: B. Andersson, S. Anderson, B. Ulvaeus
- Producer: Ole Evenrude

A-Teens singles chronology
"Happy New Year" (1999)	"Dancing Queen" (2000)	"Upside Down" (2000)

Music video
- "Dancing Queen" on YouTube

"Dancing Queen" was covered by A-Teens, an ABBA tribute band from Sweden. It is the fourth and final single from their first album, The ABBA Generation (1999). Released in March 2000, the song peaked at number 95 on the US Billboard Hot 100 and entered the top 100 in Germany and the Netherlands. In Europe, "Dancing Queen" was released as a double A-side with "The Name of the Game".

=== Music video ===
Directed by Patrick Kiely, the video is set in a large high school. The video is a tribute to the 1980s film The Breakfast Club, where the group members are left in a classroom with other students which shifts into a nightclub. Paul Gleason, the actor who played the assistant principal in The Breakfast Club, makes a cameo appearance.

=== Track listings ===
- European 2-track CD single
1. "Dancing Queen" (album version) – 3:48
2. "The Name of the Game" – 4:17
- European and Mexican CD maxi
1. "Dancing Queen" (album version) – 3:48
2. "Dancing Queen" (Pierre J's Main Radio Mix) – 3:27
3. "Dancing Queen" (Pierre J's Main Extended Mix) – 5:47
4. "Dancing Queen" (BTS Gold Edition Mix) – 5:13
- US CD and cassette single
1. "Dancing Queen" (album version) – 3:48
2. "Dancing Queen" (extended version) – 5:48

=== Charts ===
Weekly chart performance for the A*Teens cover
Chart (2000)	Peak position
Czech Republic (IFPI)	18
Germany (GfK)	64
Netherlands (Single Top 100)	88
Netherlands (Tipparade)	13
US Billboard Hot 100	95

Annual chart rankings for the A*Teens cover
Chart (2000)	Rank
European Airplay (Border Breakers)	100

=== Release history ===
Region	Date	Format(s)	Label(s)	Ref(s).
United States	7 March 2000	7-inch vinyl; CD	Stockholm; MCA	
United States	25 April 2000	Contemporary hit radio	Stockholm; MCA	

== Other versions ==
=== Abbacadabra version ===
In 1992, the British disco group, known for covers of ABBA's songs in a Hi-NRG style charted at number 57 on the UK singles chart after the song was licensed from Almighty Records by Pete Waterman's PWL, due to its popularity on his late-night television program The Hitman and Her. The song peaked at number 104 on the Australian singles chart in November 1992. In the US, the song was signed to BMG, where Abbacadabra's version became a club hit after being remixed by Love To Infinity.

=== S Club 7 version ===
In 1999, British pop group S Club 7 recorded a version of the song for the one-off ITV programme ABBAmania, and the tribute album of the same name. The pop group also performed a version on their own TV series, Miami 7.

=== Glee version ===
Naya Rivera and Amber Riley of the Glee cast performed the song in "Prom Queen". It charted on the Billboard Hot 100 at number 74 and in the United Kingdom at number 169.

=== Mamma Mia! Here We Go Again version ===
"Dancing Queen" was released on 13 July 2018 alongside the Mamma Mia! Here We Go Again soundtrack, by Capitol and Polydor Records. It was released on 21 July 2018 as the fourth single from the soundtrack. The song is performed by Pierce Brosnan, Christine Baranski, Julie Walters, Colin Firth, Stellan Skarsgård, Dominic Cooper and Amanda Seyfried; it was produced by Benny Andersson.

==== Charts ====
Chart performance for "Dancing Queen" by the cast of Mamma Mia! Here We Go Again
Chart (2018)	Peak position
Scottish Singles Sales (Official Charts)	74
