= Can't Help Falling in Love =

1961 single by Elvis Presley

- One of the original 1961 North American variants of the artwork

Single by Elvis Presley

from the album Blue Hawaii
- B-side: "Rock-A-Hula Baby"
- Released: November 21, 1961
- Recorded: March 23, 1961
- Studio: Radio Recorders, Hollywood
- Genre: Pop; easy listening
- Length: 2:59
- Label: RCA Victor
- Songwriters: Hugo Peretti; Luigi Creatore; George David Weiss
- Producer: Elvis Presley (Joseph Lilley for Paramount Pictures)

Elvis Presley singles chronology
"Little Sister" (1961)	"Can't Help Falling in Love" / "Rock-A-Hula Baby" (1961)	"Good Luck Charm" / "Anything That's Part of You" (1962)

Audio video
- "Can't Help Falling in Love" on YouTube

"Can't Help Falling in Love" is a song written by Hugo Peretti, Luigi Creatore, and George David Weiss and published by Gladys Music, Inc. The melody is based on "Plaisir d'amour", a popular French love song composed in 1784 by Jean-Paul-Égide Martini. The song was initially written from the perspective of a woman as "Can't Help Falling in Love with Him", which explains the first and third line ending on "in" rather than words rhyming with "you".

Recorded by singer and actor Elvis Presley, it was part of the album Blue Hawaii (1961), the soundtrack to the movie Blue Hawaii. The song was recorded subsequently in the 1960s by Perry Como, the Lennon Sisters, Doris Day, Patti Page, Andy Williams, Al Martino and Keely Smith. In the 1970s, the song was recorded by Marty Robbins, Bob Dylan, the Stylistics, Shirley Bassey, and Engelbert Humperdinck.

Through the decades, European artists, including Swedish pop group A-Teens, and British reggae and pop group UB40, recorded their own versions, and grunge band Pearl Jam has covered it at their concerts. Newer versions continue to be recorded by newer artists, such as Kacey Musgraves who recorded a version in 2022 for a movie about Elvis Presley. This song was ranked one of the greatest songs of all time by Rolling Stone Magazine. In 2012, it was ranked at No. 403.

== Background, release and use in society ==
Elvis Presley's version of the song topped the UK Singles Chart in 1962, spending four weeks at No. 1. The single is certified Platinum by the RIAA, for US sales in excess of one million copies. In the United States, the song peaked at No. 2 on the US Billboard Hot 100 behind Joey Dee and the Starliters' "Peppermint Twist" and went to No. 1 on the Adult Contemporary chart for six weeks.

During Presley's late 1960s and 1970s live performances, the song was performed as the shows' finales. Most notably, it was also sung in the live segment of his 1968 NBC television special Elvis, and as the closer for his 1973 global telecast Aloha from Hawaii via Satellite. A version with a faster arrangement was the closing number in Presley's final TV special, Elvis in Concert. "Can't Help Falling in Love" was also the last song he performed live, at his concert in Indianapolis at Market Square Arena on June 26, 1977.

The recording appeared on the 1997 CD re-issue Elvis' Golden Records Volume 3 as a bonus track and on the 2002 career retrospective collection ELV1S: 30 No. 1 Hits. In 2010, the song was included on the Viva Elvis: The Album. This is a remixed version that features Canadian singer Sherry St-Germain. Interestingly the track fades out with Elvis repeating part of the 1956 song "Love Me". In 2015, the song was included on the If I Can Dream album on the 80th anniversary of Presley's birth. The version uses archival voice recordings of Presley and his singers, backed by new orchestral arrangements performed by the Royal Philharmonic Orchestra.

The song is used as an anthem by a handful of English football clubs, with Sunderland AFC being the most commonly associated. When referencing the song, their fans refer to it as ‘Wise Men Say’, opposed to the actual song title. Indeed, their longest running fan podcast is named Wise Men Say, while there was also a short-lived and unrelated fanzine with the same name in the 1980s. While debates are ongoing about the origins of the song first being used as a football terrace chant, a widely accepted theory is that Sunderland fans originally sang it at a game just four days after the death of Presley in 1977.

Incidentally, their opponents on that day, Hull City, also adopted the chant, adding to the validity of this account. However, as a football club, Hull doesn’t have the reach, fanbase or levels of publicity that Sunderland does. Fans of both Swansea City and Swindon Town also sing versions of the song.

According to a 2020 survey by OnBuy, the song is the most popular choice for couples as the song for the first dance at their wedding.

== Track listings ==
- 7-inch single
  - Side A: "I Can't Help Falling in Love With You"
  - Side B: "Rock-A-Hula Baby"

== Personnel ==
Credits sourced from AFM union contracts and label records.

- Elvis Presley – lead vocals
- The Jordanaires – backing vocals
- Scotty Moore – electric guitar
- Hank Garland – acoustic guitar
- Dudley Brooks – piano, celesta
- Bob Moore – double bass
- D. J. Fontana – drums
- Hal Blaine – percussion
- Alvino Rey – pedal steel guitar
- Boots Randolph – saxophone
- George Fields – harmonica
- Freddie Tavares – ukulele

== Charts ==
=== Weekly charts ===
Chart (1962)	Peak position
Australia	3
Austria	20
Canada (CHUM Hit Parade)	4
Ireland (IRMA)	11
Italy	11
Netherlands	11
New Zealand (Lever Hit Parade)	2
South Africa (Springbok)	1
Sweden (Sverigetopplistan)	2
UK Singles (OCC)	1
US Billboard Hot 100	2
US Adult Contemporary (Billboard)	1
US Cash Box Top 100	4
West Germany (Media Control Charts)	22

Chart (2022)	Peak position
Hungary (Single Top 40)	40

=== Year-end charts ===
Chart (1962)	Position
South Africa	5
UK	6
US Billboard Hot 100	57
US Cash Box Top 100	28

== Certifications ==
Region	Certification	Certified units/sales
Denmark (IFPI Danmark)	Platinum	90,000^{‡}
Germany (BVMI)	Gold	300,000^{‡}
Italy (FIMI)	Platinum	100,000^{‡}
New Zealand (RMNZ)	3× Platinum	90,000^{‡}
Spain (Promusicae)	Platinum	60,000^{‡}
United Kingdom (BPI)	3× Platinum	1,800,000^{‡}
United States (RIAA)	Platinum	1,000,000^{^}
^{^} Shipments figures based on certification alone.^{‡} Sales+streaming figures based on certification alone.

== UB40 version ==
"(I Can't Help) Falling in Love with You"
- European variant of standard CD/vinyl edition

Single by UB40

from the album Sliver: Music from the Motion Picture and Promises and Lies
- B-side: "Jungle Love"
- Released: 10 May 1993
- Genre: Reggae fusion; dance-pop; funk
- Length: 3:24
- Label: DEP International; Virgin
- Songwriters: Hugo Peretti; Luigi Creatore; George David Weiss
- Producer: UB40

UB40 singles chronology
"One in Ten" (1992)	"(I Can't Help) Falling in Love with You" (1993)	"Higher Ground" (1993)

Music video
- "(I Can't Help) Falling in Love with You" on YouTube

In 1993, British reggae band UB40 covered the original 1961 Elvis Presley recording as the first single from their tenth album, Promises and Lies (1993). The song, renamed "(I Can't Help) Falling in Love with You", was released on May 10, 1993, by Virgin Records, and eventually climbed to No. 1 on the US Billboard Hot 100, staying there for seven weeks, becoming their fourth and last top-10 hit. It also topped the charts of 11 other countries, including Australia, Austria, the Netherlands, New Zealand (where it was the most successful single of 1993), and the United Kingdom, where it spent two weeks at No. 1.

The song appears on the soundtrack of the 1993 movie Sliver, the trailer for the 1997 film Fools Rush In, and an episode of the 2015 series Hindsight. In the US, and on the Sliver soundtrack, the song title was listed as "Can't Help Falling in Love", rather than what appeared on the record sleeve, which included parentheses around the words "I Can't Help". The single version of the song also has a slightly different backing rhythm and melody.

=== Critical reception ===
In his review, Rovi Staff from AllMusic noted that "carried by the hit 'Can't Help Falling in Love', Promises and Lies finishes UB40's transition from a reggae band to an adult-contemporary band that plays reggae-pop." Another AllMusic editor, David Jeffries, said the song represents "the ultra-slick, easy to swallow side of the band". Larry Flick from Billboard magazine wrote, "U.K. dancehall stars indulge in Elvis Presley memories on this first single from the soundtrack to Sharon Stone's new movie, Sliver." He added that it "has a pillowy, midtempo pace that dabbles in island beats and radio-conscious funk. Brassy horns are a jolting, though ultimately pleasing, element in the arrangement. A fun respite from usual top 40 fare."

Marisa Fox from Entertainment Weekly said the song is "this album's equivalent" of their earlier version of Neil Diamond's "Red Red Wine", noting that the band "revitalize" it. She also noted that "they try some snappy new production tricks", like the "full-blown orchestrations" on the song, adding that "those kinds of enhancements only make the blend that much more infectious." In his weekly UK chart commentary, James Masterton wrote that "this was a hit almost before it had even been released." Pan-European magazine Music & Media complimented it as a "reggae remake that sounds like the sun will never stop shining." Alan Jones from Music Week described it as a "predictable ramble through the Elvis Presley/Andy Williams/Stylistics perennial". People magazine called it a "Rasta-Lite" version.

=== Music video ===
A music video was produced to promote the single, directed by American filmmaker Neil Abramson. It features scenes from the movie and snippets of the band playing and dancing. It was later made available on YouTube in 2009 and had generated more than 95 million views as of April 2026. An alternate version exists that just features footage of the band without any clips from the movie.

=== Track listings ===
- 7-inch single
1. "I Can't Help Falling in Love with You" – 3:24
2. "Jungle Love" – 5:09
- 10-inch single
1. "I Can't Help Falling in Love with You" (Extended Mix) – 6:03
2. "Jungle Love" – 5:09
3. "I Can't Help Falling in Love with You" – 3:24
- CD single
1. "I Can't Help Falling in Love with You" – 3:24
2. "Jungle Love" – 5:09
- CD maxi
1. "I Can't Help Falling in Love with You" – 3:24
2. "Jungle Love" – 5:09
3. "I Can't Help Falling in Love with You" (Extended Mix) – 6:03

=== Charts ===
==== Weekly charts ====
Chart (1993)	Peak position
Australia (ARIA)	1
Austria (Ö3 Austria Top 40)	1
Belgium (Ultratop 50 Flanders)	1
Canada Retail Singles (The Record)	1
Canada Top Singles (RPM)	1
Canada Adult Contemporary (RPM)	6
Chile (UPI)	2
Denmark (IFPI)	1
Europe (Eurochart Hot 100)	1
Europe (European Hit Radio)	1
Finland (Suomen virallinen lista)	1
France (SNEP)	5
Germany (GfK)	2
Iceland (Íslenski Listinn Topp 40)	1
Ireland (IRMA)	2
Italy (Musica e dischi)	9
Japan (Oricon)	40
Netherlands (Dutch Top 40)	1
Netherlands (Single Top 100)	1
New Zealand (Recorded Music NZ)	1
Norway (VG-lista)	4
Peru (UPI)	9
Spain (AFYVE)	3
Sweden (Sverigetopplistan)	1
Switzerland (Schweizer Hitparade)	2
UK Singles (Official Charts)	1
UK Airplay (Music Week)	1
US Billboard Hot 100	1
US Adult Contemporary (Billboard)	11
US Alternative Airplay (Billboard)	11
US Pop Airplay (Billboard)	1
US Rhythmic Airplay (Billboard)	5
US Cash Box Top 100	1

==== Year-end charts ====
Chart (1993)	Position
Australia (ARIA)	5
Austria (Ö3 Austria Top 40)	5
Belgium (Ultratop)	10
Canada Top Singles (RPM)	6
Canada Adult Contemporary (RPM)	38
Europe (Eurochart Hot 100)	8
Europe (European Hit Radio)	2
Iceland (Íslenski Listinn Topp 40)	26
Netherlands (Dutch Top 40)	5
Netherlands (Single Top 100)	8
New Zealand (RIANZ)	1
Sweden (Topplistan)	5
Switzerland (Schweizer Hitparade)	6
UK Singles (OCC)	2
UK Airplay (Music Week)	13
US Billboard Hot 100	3
US Adult Contemporary (Billboard)	43
US Cash Box Top 100	1

Chart (2013)	Position
Brazil (Crowley)	100

==== Decade-end charts ====
Chart (1990–1999)	Position
Canada (Nielsen SoundScan)	20
Netherlands (Dutch Top 40)	43
US Billboard Hot 100	22

=== Certifications ===
Region	Certification	Certified units/sales
Australia (ARIA)	2× Platinum	140,000^{^}
Austria (IFPI Austria)	Gold	25,000^{*}
France (SNEP)	Silver	125,000^{*}
Germany (BVMI)	Platinum	500,000^{^}
New Zealand (RMNZ)	2× Platinum	60,000^{‡}
Spain (Promusicae)	Gold	30,000^{‡}
United Kingdom (BPI)	Platinum	606,000
United States (RIAA)	Platinum	1,300,000
^{*} Sales figures based on certification alone.^{^} Shipments figures based on certification alone.^{‡} Sales+streaming figures based on certification alone.

=== Release history ===
Region	Date	Format(s)	Label(s)	Ref.
United Kingdom	May 10, 1993	7-inch vinyl; 12-inch vinyl	DEP International; Virgin	
Australia	May 30, 1993	CD; cassette	DEP International; Virgin	
Japan	June 2, 1993	Mini-CD	DEP International; Virgin	
Japan	February 23, 1994	Mini-CD	DEP International; Virgin	

== A-Teens version ==
"Can't Help Falling in Love"

Single by A-Teens

from the album Lilo & Stitch and Pop 'til You Drop!
- B-side: "Hawaiian Roller Coaster Ride"
- Released: 2002
- Genre: Teen pop
- Length: 3:06
- Label: Walt Disney
- Songwriters: Hugo Peretti; Luigi Creatore; George David Weiss
- Producer: Mark Hammond

A-Teens singles chronology
"Heartbreak Lullaby" (2001)	"Can't Help Falling in Love" (2002)	"Floorfiller" (2002)

Audio video
- "Can't Help Falling in Love" on YouTube

"Can't Help Falling in Love" was the first single from Swedish pop music group A-Teens' third studio album, Pop 'til You Drop! (2002), and is also included in the Lilo & Stitch movie soundtrack. The song has two music videos, one to promote the Disney movie, the other for the album. The song is also included in the 2005 teen pop compilation album Disney Girlz Rock and featured as a bonus track on the A-Teens' 2003 album New Arrival for the European market. The music video was directed by Gregory Dark and filmed in Los Angeles, California. There are two different versions of the video: one which features scenes from Lilo & Stitch and one without.

=== Track listing ===
1. "Can't Help Falling in Love" (album version) – 3:06
2. "Hawaiian Roller Coaster Ride" (Performed by Mark Keali'i Ho'omalu and North Shore Children's Choir & Key Cygnetures) – 3:27
3. "He Mele, No Lilo" (Performed by Mark Keali'i Ho'omalu and North Shore Children's Choir & Key Cygnetures) – 2:28

=== Personnel ===
- Marie Serneholt - vocals
- Sara Lumholdt - vocals
- Dhani Lennevald - vocals
- Amit Paul - vocals
- Melody Chambers - backing vocals
- Andrew Ramsey - guitar (acoustic, electric)

=== Charts ===
Chart (2002)	Peak position
Australia (ARIA)	35
Netherlands (Single Top 100)	50
Sweden (Sverigetopplistan)	12

== Other notable versions ==
- An uptempo version by Andy Williams peaked at No. 3 in the UK Singles Chart in March 1970.
- An Al Martino recording was released by Capitol Records and charted in 1970, peaking at No. 51 on the Billboard charts and No. 57 on the Cashbox chart.
- The Stylistics went to No. 4 in the UK with a disco version from their album Fabulous in 1976.
- Engelbert Humperdinck recorded the song in 1979 on his This Moment in Time LP. The single became an Adult Contemporary hit, reaching No. 44 in the US and No. 11 in Canada.
- Slim Whitman recorded the song in 1981 and it was included on his album Mr. Songman. This version peaked at No. 54 on the Billboard country charts, and was his last chart entry in his career.
- Klaus Nomi on his 1983 album Encore.
- Lick the Tins first released their version on a single in 1985 and included it on their 1986 album Blind Man on a Flying Horse. It peaked at no. 42 and spent nine weeks on the UK Singles Chart that year. It was also used in the 1987 movie Some Kind of Wonderful.
- In 1986, Fleetwood Mac keyboardist and vocalist Christine McVie covered the song as part of the soundtrack for the movie A Fine Mess.
- In 1987, Corey Hart's recording from his album Fields of Fire reached No. 1 in Canada and No. 24 on the Billboard Hot 100 in 1987.
- Celine Dion has performed her version of the song at many of her concerts, using it as the ending song on select nights of her 1993 The Colour of My Love Tour. She added drama to the song with strings and an electric guitar joining in. She has never recorded her version.
- The British band Spiritualized borrows the melody of this song for the title track of their 1997 album Ladies and Gentlemen We Are Floating in Space; it also partially interpolates the lyrics.
- Russell Watson reached No. 69 in the United Kingdom in a 2006 recording from his LP The Ultimate Collection.
- In 2008, the song was covered by neo-medieval folk rock band Blackmore's Night on their album Secret Voyage.
- In 2012, the song was covered by American rock duo Twenty One Pilots on their EP Holding On to You.
- A more recent German version, "Was Kann Mein Herz Dafür" by Claudia Jung was released in 2015 for her album, Seitensprung.
- Haley Reinhart's 2015 remake of the song peaked at No. 17 on the Billboard Adult Contemporary chart and No. 31 on the Billboard Adult Pop Airplay chart. It was certified Platinum by the Recording Industry Association of America on July 31, 2023. Music Canada certified it Double Platinum in Canada on January 25, 2023.
- In 2016, Perfume Genius covered the song for a Prada fragrances advertisement. It was later used for the soundtrack of the 2023 film Red, White & Royal Blue.
- In 2017, it was covered by Daniel Padilla for the film of the same name.
- In 2018, Iliana Eve's remake was a single from the album Jazz (Deluxe) that hit No. 1 on the Billboard Jazz Charts. She was 15 years old when she recorded the song with Benny Reid.
- A rendition sung by Kina Grannis appears in the 2018 film Crazy Rich Asians and the accompanying soundtrack. This was certified Gold by RIAA in 2022.
- The Grammy-nominated Elvis soundtrack from Baz Luhrmann's 2022 biographical film Elvis featured versions of the song modernized by Kacey Musgraves, Mark Ronson, and G-Dragon.
- The song was sampled by Jvke for "I Can't Help It" (2022) from this EP This Is What Falling Out of Love Feels Like (392 Hz).
