= A-Teens =

Swedish pop group

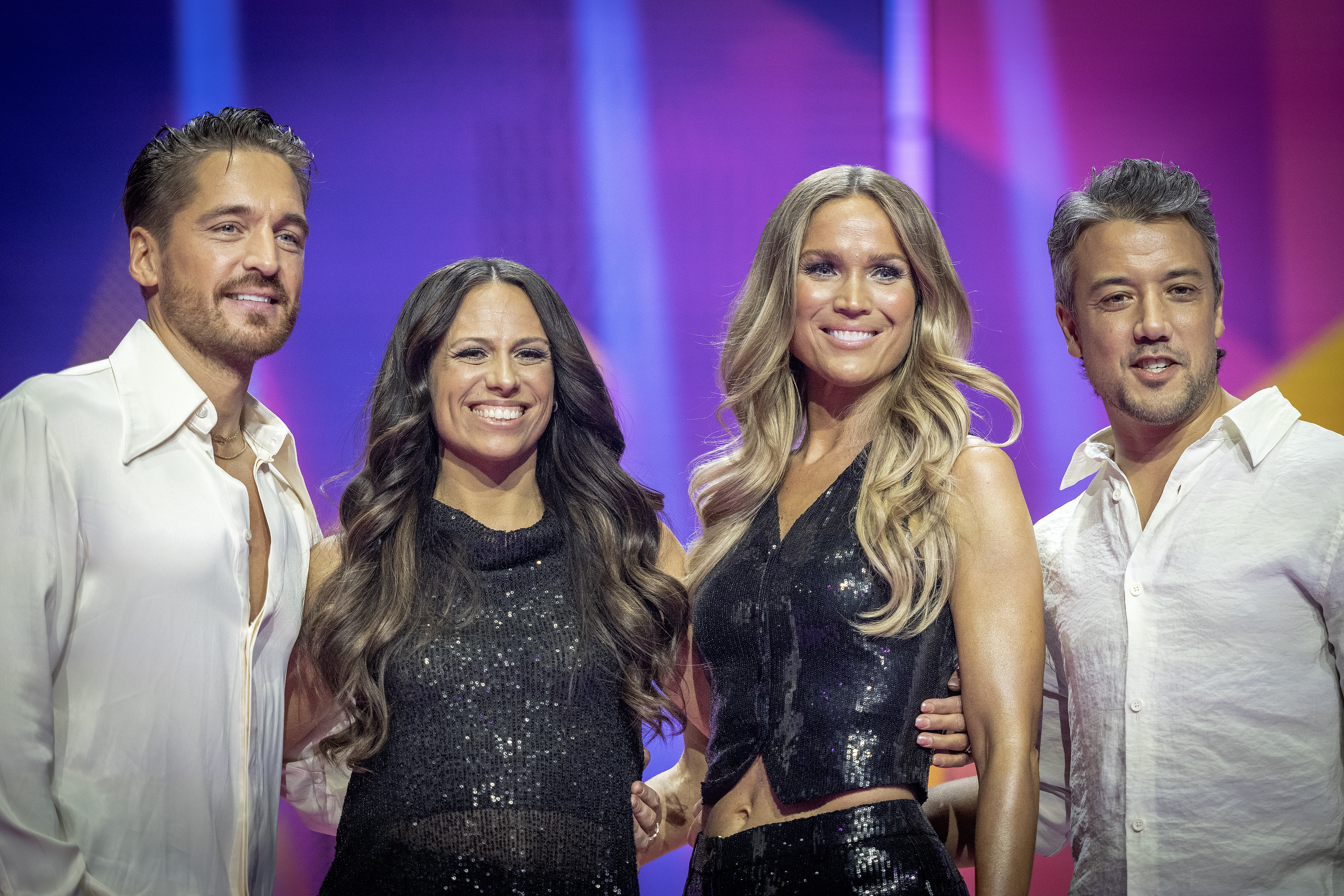
- The group in 2026. From left to right: Lennevald, Lumholdt, Serneholt, and Paul

Background information
- Also known as: ABBA-Teens
- Origin: Stockholm, Sweden
- Genres: Euro-pop; Teen pop
- Years active: 1998–2004; 2024–present
- Labels: Stockholm; MCA; Universal
- Members: Dhani Lennevald; Sara Lumholdt; Amit Sebastian Paul; Marie Serneholt
- Website: a-teens.com at the Wayback Machine (archived 19 May 2014)

A-Teens (stylized as A*Teens) are a Swedish pop music group formed in Stockholm by Niklas Berg in 1998. The quartet consists of Marie Serneholt, Amit Paul, Dhani Lennevald, and Sara Lumholdt. Originally established as an ABBA tribute band under the name ABBA-Teens, they were later renamed A-Teens. The group has achieved significant commercial success in their home country, amassing eleven top-ten singles on the Swedish charts.

Their debut studio album, The ABBA Generation (1999), consists entirely of ABBA cover songs. It topped the Swedish charts and produced the worldwide hit single "Mamma Mia". The album also features "Super Trouper", which peaked at number two in Sweden, the domestic top-ten hit "Gimme! Gimme! Gimme!", and "Dancing Queen", which served as the group's debut single in the United States. They transitioned to original material with Teen Spirit (2001), which peaked at number two on the domestic charts and features the international hit "Upside Down". The group's third studio project was split into two regional releases: Pop 'til You Drop! (2002), released primarily in the Americas alongside the single "Can't Help Falling in Love", and an internationally reissued edition titled New Arrival (2003). The latter achieved significant success in Sweden, reaching number four on the Swedish charts and generating the domestic top-five hit singles "Floorfiller" and "A Perfect Match".

After a six-year initial run, the group disbanded following the release of their Greatest Hits compilation in 2004, which spawned the Swedish number-two single "I Promised Myself". Following a 20-year hiatus, the group reunited in 2024. They subsequently competed in Melodifestivalen 2026 with the single "Iconic", which debuted at number one in Sweden and placed seventh in the final.

== History ==
=== 1998–2000: The ABBA Generation ===
The original logo that the band used for their first releases under the original name, ABBA-Teens

In 1998, Marie, Sara, Dhani, and Amit came together to form the ABBA-Teens and began recording their debut album which would consist entirely of covers of ABBA songs. Their first single, "Mamma Mia", was first released in April 1999 in their native Sweden where it stayed at number one for eight consecutive weeks. Following this release, the group's name was changed to the A-Teens to avoid litigation. "Mamma Mia" was released internationally following their name change and became a top 20 hit in over ten countries.

The official A-Teens logo

In August 1999, the group released their debut album The ABBA Generation, consisting entirely of ABBA covers reinterpreted with a modern pop and electronic sound. The album reached number one in Sweden and Argentina. In the United States, the album peaked at seventy-one on the Billboard 200 Albums Chart and was certified Gold. The album sold more than 2 million copies worldwide and was certified Gold or Platinum in over 22 countries. Further singles from the album were hits in Sweden: "Super Trouper" peaked at number two and "Gimme! Gimme! Gimme! (A Man After Midnight) peaked at number ten; both songs charted moderately worldwide. "Happy New Year" was released as a standalone single in Sweden at the end of 1999 and peaked at number four.

In March 2000, the group released the single "Dancing Queen". The single reached ninety-five on the Billboard Hot 100. Coinciding with this release, the band embarked on a promotional tour of the United States and was an opening act for the Britney Spears tour later that summer. The group made several appearances on Disney and Nickelodeon. In September 2000, the A-Teens won a Viva Music Award for Best International Newcomer.

=== 2001: Teen Spirit ===
On 26 February 2001, the group released their second studio album Teen Spirit, which consists entirely of original tracks. It debuted at number two in the Swedish Charts. The album peaked at number thirteen on the European Albums Chart. In the United States, the album peaked at number fifty and was certified gold. The album was preceded by the single "Upside Down" in October 2000; this was their first single that was not an ABBA cover song. It peaked at number two in Sweden and was certified 2× Platinum. The song reached the top ten in several countries. In the United States, the song was released with the alternate title "Bouncing Off the Ceiling (Upside Down)". The song peaked at 93 on the Billboard Hot 100 and the physical single peaked at number six on the Billboard Dance Single Sales component chart. The single peaked at number ten in the United Kingdom, becoming their only top ten hit in the country. Later singles from the album were hits in Sweden: "Halfway Around the World" peaked at number 7 and "Sugar Rush" peaked at number 15.

The group promoted the album with a forty-three-date tour with Aaron Carter in the U.S.; the group later toured with No Angels in Germany. The A-Teens also performed on the Radio Disney Live! 2001 World Tour. The same year, Coca-Cola signed the group to become the face of the brand in Thailand. By the end of 2001, Teen Spirit sold over 1 million copies worldwide. In December 2001, the group released the Cathy Dennis-penned track "Heartbreak Lullaby". The song was recorded for the European soundtrack of the movie "The Princess Diaries". The single became another top ten hit for the band in their home country.

=== 2002–2003: Pop 'til You Drop! and New Arrival ===
In June 2002, the group released their third studio album Pop 'til You Drop!. The album was released exclusively in North America and South America. The album debuted and peaked at number forty-five on the Billboard 200 Albums Chart. The album was preceded by the single "Can't Help Falling In Love", a cover of the Elvis Presley song, in May 2002. The song was also featured on the soundtrack of the Disney movie Lilo & Stitch. In July 2002, "Floorfiller" was released as the second and final single from the album. In the summer of 2002, the group embarked on the Pop 'til You Drop! Tour, a thirty-date tour of the United States and Canada. In November 2002, the group performed at the 2002 Swedish Hit Music Awards.

In January 2003, the group released a reissue of Pop 'til You Drop! titled New Arrival exclusively in markets outside of North America. The album contains seven tracks from Pop 'til You Drop! alongside six new tracks. The album debuted at number four in Sweden and was certified Gold a few weeks after its release. To promote the release, the band embarked on the New Arrival Tour that March, performing shows in Sweden, Denmark, Russia, and Slovakia. The album was preceded by the European release of "Floorfiller", which served as the album's first single and became a top five hit in their home country. The second single taken from the album was "A Perfect Match" which peaked at number two in Sweden. "Let Your Heart Do All the Talking" was planned as the third single from New Arrival, but its commercial release was later cancelled. In May 2003, the group partnered with the brand Popdrinks for a promotional-only release of the song "Bounce With Me" in Sweden.

=== 2004: Greatest Hits and disbandment ===
In May 2004, the group released Greatest Hits, a compilation of three new songs and thirteen singles. The album was preceded by the single "I Promised Myself", a cover of the Nick Kamen song. The single became another top two hit for the group in Sweden.

Following the release of Greatest Hits, the group disbanded; their disbandment was not publicly announced until April 2006.

=== 2024–present: Reunion and Melodifestivalen 2026 ===
In February 2024, the group reformed and performed at the Swedish music competition Melodifestivalen 2024.

In 2025, the group began to tour again, beginning with a performance at Club Hípico de Concepción, in Hualpén, Concepción Chile on 12 January 2025. Throughout that year, they performed several dates across the United Kingdom, Mexico, Buenos Aires, Argentina, and Chile.

On 30 January 2026, the group released the single "Iconic", their first release of new music in 20 years. It debuted at number one in Sweden. "Iconic" was selected as part of Melodifestivalen 2026, and the group performed it for the competition on 31 January 2026 in Linköping. They qualified to the final, in which they placed seventh. On 20 May, the group announced a new single titled “You Got The Look” via their official Instagram. The single was released on 5 June 2026.

== Discography ==
- The ABBA Generation (1999)
- Teen Spirit (2001)
- Pop 'til You Drop! (2002)

== Tours ==
- Pop ‘Til You Drop! Tour (2002)
- A*Teens Generation Tour (2025)
- Summer EU Tour (2026)
