= Sugar Rush (A-Teens song) =

Single by A-Teens

from the album Teen Spirit
- B-side: "Give It Up"
- Released: 18 June 2001
- Recorded: 2000
- Genre: Latin pop
- Length: 3:03 (Album version); 3:02 (Radio edit)
- Label: Universal Music Group
- Songwriters: Thomander; Wikström
- Producers: Tremolo (Tobias Lindell and Peter Björklund)

A-Teens singles chronology
"Halfway Around the World" (2001)	"Sugar Rush" (2001)	"Heartbreak Lullaby" (2001)

Music video
- "Sugar Rush" on YouTube

Sugar Rush is the third single from the album Teen Spirit by A-Teens. "Sugar Rush" peaked at number 15 in Sweden and number 72 in Germany becoming (at that time) the lowest chart positions for the A-Teens in both countries.

American boy band Dream Street recorded a cover of the song and released it on their eponymous debut album as a third single in select regions.

== Music video ==
The video was filmed in Malibu, California, United States while the band was there promoting the album and touring with Aaron Carter. The video was directed by Patrick Kiely (who directed "Upside Down" and "Dancing Queen").

== Releases ==
European 2-Track CD Single

1. Sugar Rush (Fredrik Thomander) [Radio Version] - 3:02
2. Give It Up (Anders Wikström, Fredrik Thomander) - 3:41

Video: Halfway Around The World (Gustav Jonsson, Marcus Sepehrmanesh, Tommy Tysper)

European CD Maxi

1. Sugar Rush [Radio Version] - 3:02
2. Sugar Rush [Earhbound's Short Sugarcrush Remix] - 3:20
3. Sugar Rush [Earhbound's Long Sugarcrush Remix] - 5:07
4. Sugar Rush [M12 Remix] - 6:05

== Charts ==
=== Weekly charts ===
Chart (2001)	Peak position
Germany (GfK)	72
Sweden (Sverigetopplistan)	15

=== Year-end charts ===
Chart (2001)	Position
Sweden (Hitlistan)	89

== Release history ==
Region	Date	Format	Label	Ref.
Europe	18 June 2001	CD	Stockholm	
