= Halfway Around the World =

2001 single by A-Teens

Single by A-Teens

from the album Teen Spirit
- B-side: "Can't Stop the Pop"
- Released: 12 March 2001
- Length: 3:40 (album version); 3:36 (radio edit)
- Label: Universal
- Songwriters: Tysper, Jonson, Sepehrmanesh
- Producer: Tysper

A-Teens singles chronology
"Upside Down" (2000)	"Halfway Around the World" (2001)	"Sugar Rush" (2001)

Music video
- "Halfway Around the World" on YouTube

Halfway Around the World is the second single from the album Teen Spirit by A-Teens. The single peaked at number seven in Sweden and earned a gold certification.

== Music video ==
The video premiered in March 2001 and it was directed by Mikadelica. It shows the A-Teens in different parts of the world (Peru, Paris, somewhere in the North, and China) and the action takes place in different seasons, but all of this ends up taking place on a set for a film shooting. There is also a love story between two staff members. The song tells the story of two people who are "halfway around the world," but that them being distanced from each other won't stop their love for each other.

== Releases ==
European 2-Track CD Single

1. Halfway Around the World [Radio Version] - 3:36
2. Can't Stop the Pop - 3:00

European/Mexican CD Maxi

1. Halfway Around the World [Radio Version] - 3:36
2. Halfway Around the World [Earthbound's Halfway Around The Earth Mix Long] - 6:20
3. Halfway Around the World [M12 Massive Club Mix] - 6:35

Video: Upside Down

UK CD

1. Halfway Around the World [Radio Version] - 3:41
2. Gimme! Gimme! Gimme! (A Man After Midnight) - 3:56
3. Halfway Around the World [Almighty Definitive Remix] - 7:45
4. Video: Halfway Around the World

UK Cassette

1. Halfway Around the World [Radio Version] - 3:41
2. Gimme! Gimme! Gimme! (A Man After Midnight) - 3:56
3. Halfway Around the World [Almighty Definitive Remix] - 7:45

Promo CD

1. Halfway Around the World [Radio Version] - 3:36

== Charts ==
=== Weekly charts ===
Chart (2001)	Peak position
Germany (GfK)	51
Scotland Singles (OCC)	18
Sweden (Sverigetopplistan)	7
Switzerland (Schweizer Hitparade)	73
UK Singles (OCC)	30

=== Year-end charts ===
Chart (2001)	Position
Sweden (Hitlistan)	54

== Certifications and sales ==
Region	Certification	Certified units/sales
Sweden (GLF)	Gold	15,000^{^}
^{^} Shipments figures based on certification alone.

== Release history ==
Region	Date	Format	Label	Ref.
Europe	12 March 2001	CD	Stockholm	
