= The ABBA Generation =

Studio album by A-Teens
- Released: 25 August 1999
- Recorded: January–March 1999
- Studios: Jam Lab Studio 3 (Gothenburg); Hitsville Studios (Halden); RNT Studios (Varberg); Janglers Inn (Stockholm); Polar Studios (Stockholm); Recordia Studio (Varberg); Stockhouse Studios (Stockholm)
- Genres: Pop; Europop
- Length: 42:50
- Labels: Stockholm Records; MCA
- Producers: Ole Evenrude; Johan S; Thomas Johansson; Ronald Malmberg; Hartmann; Langhoff

A-Teens chronology
The ABBA Generation (1999)	The ABBA Generation Remix (2001)

Alternative cover
- 2000 North American edition

Singles from The ABBA Generation
- 1. "Mamma Mia" Released: 30 April 1999; 2. "Super Trouper" Released: 2 August 1999; 3. "Gimme! Gimme! Gimme! (A Man After Midnight)" Released: 25 October 1999; 4. "Dancing Queen" Released: 7 March 2000

The ABBA Generation is the debut studio album by Swedish pop group A-Teens. It was released on 25 August 1999 by Stockholm Records. The album is composed of cover versions of well-known ABBA songs. The album spawned four singles, "Mamma Mia", "Gimme! Gimme! Gimme! (A Man After Midnight)", "Super Trouper", and "Dancing Queen".

The album reached number one in Sweden and Argentina. In the United States, the album peaked at seventy-one on the Billboard 200 Albums Chart and was certified Gold.

== Background ==
In 1998, Marie, Sara, Dhani, and Amit came together to form the ABBA-Teens and began recording their debut album which would consist entirely of covers of ABBA songs. Their first single, "Mamma Mia", was first released in April 1999 in their native Sweden where it stayed at number one for eight consecutive weeks. Following this release, the group's name was changed to the A-Teens to avoid litigation. "Mamma Mia" was released internationally following their name change and topped the charts in over ten countries.

Further singles from the album were hits in Sweden: "Super Trouper" peaked at number two and "Gimme! Gimme! Gimme! (A Man After Midnight) peaked at number ten; both songs charted moderately worldwide. "Happy New Year" was released as a standalone single in Sweden at the end of 1999 and peaked at number four.

In March 2000, the group released the single "Dancing Queen". The single reached ninety-five on the Billboard Hot 100 and sold over 500,000 copies in the U.S. alone, being certified Gold. Coinciding with this release, the band embarked on a promotional tour of the United States and was an opening act for the Britney Spears tour later that summer.

== Critical reception ==
Professional ratings
Review scores
Source	Rating
AllMusic	3/5 stars
The Baltimore Sun	2/5 stars
Entertainment Weekly	B+
laut.de	1/5 stars
Rolling Stone	1.5/5 stars

Despite its commercial success around the world, the album received generally negative reviews from music critics. Alex Henderson of AllMusic said that the group's "versions of ABBA gems like "Take a Chance on Me", "Mamma Mia", "Dancing Queen", and "Voulez-Vous" aren't brilliant, but they're enjoyable—and they show just how well the songs have held up over time." He concluded his review by saying, “All things considered, The ABBA Generation is a pleasing, if unremarkable, testament to the durability of ABBA's songs." In an average review for The A.V. Club, Steven Thompson wrote, "Pop music doesn't get more marginal than a collection of overdriven dance-pop covers, but The ABBA Generation succeeds on its own modest terms."

David Hiltbrand of Entertainment Weekly gave the album a B+, saying that the group "look and sound better than their supergroup heroes; even the music is spruced up, thanks to a cast of savvy Swedish producers." Writing for Rolling Stone, Arion Berger gave the album one and a half out of five stars, saying that "all the keyboard doodling and note-for-note diligence in Scandinavia wouldn't help these poseurs bring the pure-pop greatness of the real ABBA to life."

== Track listing ==
All tracks written by Benny Andersson and Björn Ulvaeus, except as noted.

No.	Title	Writer(s)	Length
1.	"Mamma Mia"	Andersson, Ulvaeus, Stig Anderson	3:47
2.	"Gimme! Gimme! Gimme! (A Man After Midnight)"		3:57
3.	"Super Trouper"		3:52
4.	"One of Us"		3:55
5.	"Voulez-Vous"		3:42
6.	"S.O.S."		3:12
7.	"Dancing Queen"	Andersson, Ulvaeus, Anderson	3:50
8.	"Take a Chance on Me"		3:53
9.	"Lay All Your Love on Me"		4:03
10.	"The Name of the Game"	Andersson, Ulvaeus, Anderson	4:22
11.	"Our Last Summer"		4:28

Argentina, Mexico and Venezuela edition bonus tracks
No.	Title	Writer(s)	Length
12.	"Mamma Mia" (Versión en español)	Andersson, Ulvaeus, Anderson	3:43
13.	"¡Dame! ¡Dame! ¡Dame! (Gimme! Gimme! Gimme!)" (Versión en español)	Andersson, Ulvaeus, Anderson, Buddy McCluskey, Mary McCluskey	3:54

Japan edition bonus tracks
No.	Title	Writer(s)	Length
12.	"Knowing Me, Knowing You"	Andersson, Ulvaeus, Anderson	4:28
13.	"Mamma Mia" (Jam Lab Remix)	Andersson, Ulvaeus, Anderson	3:56
14.	"Super Trouper" (Pinocchio Remix)		5:08

US Target edition bonus track
No.	Title	Writer(s)	Length
12.	"A-Teens Mega Mix"	Andersson, Ulvaeus, Anderson	7:36

== Personnel ==
Adapted from the album liner notes.

Musicians

- Anneli Axon
- Anders Barrén
- Tee
- Image
- Ronald Malmberg
- Annika Sjölin
- Katarina Sjölin

Production

- Per Adebratt – vocal production
- Stefan Boman – engineer
- Tommy Ekman – vocal production
- Björn Engelmann – mastering
- Ole Evenrude — producer
- Tommy Gustavsson — programming
- Hartmann & Langhoff – producer
- Johan S. – producer
- Thomas Johansson — producer, vocal production
- Fredrik Larnemo – engineer
- Hugo Lira — programming
- Ronald Malmberg — producer, vocal production
- Christer Sandelin – vocal production
- Joakim Styrén – mixing, programming

Other personnel

- Niklas Berg – concept
- Todd Gallopo – design
- Anders Johansson – A&R
- Christer Mellström – product coordinator
- Mats Oscarsson – photos

== Charts ==
=== Weekly charts ===
Chart (1999–2000)	Peak position
Austrian Albums (Ö3 Austria)	2
Belgian Albums (Ultratop Flanders)	14
Dutch Albums (Album Top 100)	1
Finnish Albums (Suomen virallinen lista)	2
French Albums (SNEP)	39
German Albums (Offizielle Top 100)	2
Hungarian Albums (MAHASZ)	7
Japanese Albums (Oricon)	18
Norwegian Albums (VG-lista)	2
Spanish Albums (Promusicae)	19
Swedish Albums (Sverigetopplistan)	1
Swiss Albums (Schweizer Hitparade)	12
UK Albums (Official Charts)	85
US Billboard 200	71

=== Year-end charts ===
Chart (1999)	Position
Belgian Albums (Ultratop Flanders)	92
Dutch Albums (Album Top 100)	27
Chart (2000)	Position
Austrian Albums (Ö3 Austria)	17
European Albums (Music & Media)	44
German Albums (Offizielle Top 100)	21
Swiss Albums (Schweizer Hitparade)	39

=== Swedish vinyl charts ===
Chart (2026)	Position
Swedish Vinyl Albums (Sverigetopplistan)	3

== Certifications and sales ==
Region	Certification	Certified units/sales
Argentina (CAPIF)	Platinum	60,000^{^}
Austria (IFPI Austria)	Gold	25,000^{*}
Chile	—	95,000
Finland (Musiikkituottajat)	Platinum	43,628
Mexico (AMPROFON)	Gold	75,000^{^}
Netherlands (NVPI)	Platinum	100,000^{^}
Norway (IFPI Norway)	Platinum	50,000^{*}
Poland (ZPAV)	Platinum	148,000
Spain (Promusicae)	Platinum	100,000^{^}
Sweden (GLF)	2× Platinum	160,000^{^}
Switzerland (IFPI Switzerland)	Gold	25,000^{^}
United States (RIAA)	Gold	582,000
Summaries
Europe (IFPI)	Platinum	1,000,000^{*}
Worldwide	—	3,000,000
^{*} Sales figures based on certification alone.^{^} Shipments figures based on certification alone.

== Release history ==
- August 25, 1999 (Sweden)
- May 16, 2000 (USA)
