= A Perfect Match (song) =

2003 single by A-Teens

Single by A-Teens

from the album New Arrival
- B-side: "Slam"; "Singled Out"
- Released: 17 March 2003
- Length: 3:01 (album version); 3:00 (single mix)
- Label: Universal Music Group
- Songwriters: Mack; Habolin; Jansson
- Producers: Habolin, Jansson (album version); Stefan Åberg, Håkan Fredriksson (single mix)

A-Teens singles chronology
"Floorfiller" (2002)	"A Perfect Match" (2003)	"I Promised Myself" (2004)

Music video
- "A Perfect Match" on YouTube

"A Perfect Match" was A-Teens' second single from the European reissue of Pop 'til You Drop, New Arrival. The track was written by Mack, Habolin and Jasson. The song peaked at number two on the Swedish charts.

== Music video ==
The video was filmed in Cuba, and was co-directed by the A-Teens themselves. It tells a story of a rich girl and a poor boy who fall in love with each other, but their families are against their relationship; however, despite this, and their differences, they are still "a perfect match".

== Releases ==
Swedish CD single

1. A Perfect Match [Single Mix] - 3:00
2. A Perfect Match [Extended Mix] - 4:15
3. Slam - 3:04

European 2-track single

1. A Perfect Match [Single Mix] - 3:00
2. A Perfect Match [Extended Mix] - 4:15

International CD Maxi

1. A Perfect Match [Single Mix] - 3:00
2. A Perfect Match [Extended Mix] - 4:15
3. A Perfect Match [Tranceglobal Club Mix] - 5:33
4. Singled Out - 4:13

== Charts ==
=== Weekly charts ===
Chart (2003)	Peak position
Germany (GfK)	77
Sweden (Sverigetopplistan)	2

=== Year-end charts ===
Chart (2003)	Position
Sweden (Hitlistan)	39
