= Treat (band) =

Swedish rock band

- Origin: Sweden
- Genres: Hard rock, AOR, glam metal
- Years active: 1981−1993, 2006−present
- Label: Universal Sweden
- Members: Anders Wikström; Robert Ernlund; Jamie Borger; Patrick Appelgren; Nalle Påhlsson
- Past members: Leif Liljegren; Mats Dahlberg; Thomas Lind; Ken Siewertson; Leif Sundin; Joakim Larsson; Mats Levén

Treat is a Swedish hard rock band from Stockholm. Formed in 1981 by singer Robert Ernlund and guitarist Anders "Gary" Wikström, the band had national and as well as international success with songs like "Get You on the Run", "World of Promises", "Party All Over" and "Ready for the Taking" in the second half of the 1980s.

They played at rock festivals like Monsters of Rock in 1988 in Germany. They were also the opening act for Queen in Sweden in 1986 and opened for W.A.S.P. during their first Swedish tour. They were signed to the labels Mercury and then Vertigo.

The band originally disbanded in 1993 due to failing to maintain success with new singer Mats Levén; however, former band members worked later together on two new songs for the 2006 compilation album Weapons of choice 1984-2006; the album sold better than expected, convincing them that the band was still relevant. This led to Treat being revived later that year, with most of its 1989-1991 line-up, including Ernlund and Wikström, and signing up with Universal. They have since released five new studio albums: Coup de Grace, Ghost of Graceland, Tunguska, The Endgame, and The Wild Card.

== History ==
=== Formation and early days (1981–1985) ===
The band was founded in Stockholm in 1981 as "The Boys" by singer Robert Ernlund and guitarists Anders "Gary" Wikstrom and Leif "Lillen" Liljegren, a former member of punk rockers KSMB, but it was not until drummer Mats "Dalton" Dahlberg joined the band in the summer of 1983 that the band began to gain a following. Dalton had attained some contacts with Swedish PolyGram Records, which at the time was looking for a new Swedish hard rock band to sign. Around the same time bass player Tomas Lind joined and the band began to record a demo tape. When asked in early interviews who influenced their sound the band members said that they were heavily influenced by bands such as Whitesnake, Journey, Kiss and Van Halen The band's demo tape landed them a deal with Mercury Records and they started recording their debut album Scratch and Bite, changing their name to Treat. The first single released from the album was "Too Wild"; the single received much airplay in Sweden and took the Swedish hardrock scene by surprise. Europe's vocalist Rolf Magnus Joakim Larsson said in an interview that when he heard the song he knew it would be a hit so a couple of days later he wrote the song "The Final Countdown" as a rival to their single because there is rivalry in music. At the same time "Too Wild" was released, bassist Tomas Lind left the band and was replaced by Kenneth Sivertsson, former bass player with the band Factory who had a couple of hits in Sweden in the late 1970s.

The band released Scratch and Bite in the summer of 1985 and toured all over Sweden, but in August drummer Mats Dahlberg quit the band to form his own glam metal outfit Dalton, and was soon replaced with Leif Sundin who later played with Six Feet Under.

=== Success in Europe (1985–1991) ===
The band set about recording their second and most critically acclaimed album The Pleasure Principle in late 1985. It was released almost a year later in the summer of 1986 and suffered in the charts, largely due to Europe's album The Final Countdown storming the charts and the band was unfairly compared to Europe by the media and press. The song "Rev It Up" from the album was covered by American band Newcity Rockers and was a hit on the Billboard Hot 100 chart for them. The next album the band released was Dreamhunter, which spawned the successful single "World of Promises"; the video for the single received airplay on MTVs Headbangers Ball and was later covered by Swedish metal band In Flames on their 2000 album Clayman. During the recording of the album, drummer Leif Sundin left the band and was replaced by Jamie Borger. The band had only minor success with the album, but nevertheless managed to join the Monsters of Rock Tour 1988 in support of it. Soon after they completed the tour guitarist Leif Liljegren was fired from the band in December 1988, followed shortly by bassist Kenneth Siwertsson, who quit in February 1989 due to the band's lack of success.

The band's final album of the 1980s was Organized Crime, released in September 1989 on Vertigo Records. For this album the band brought in bassist Joakim "Joe" Larsson (ex-Six Feet Under, Power, Jammer) to replace Siwertsson. They also decided to replace Liljegren with a keyboard player instead of a new guitarist, in order to take some burden off Wikström´s shoulders, who always played both guitar and keys live. Patrick "Green" Appelgren (ex-Power), the younger brother of Mikael "Äpplet" Appelgren (European table tennis champion in the late 1980s), handled all keys from then on. The album did badly in the charts and was a commercial disappointment. The band toured in Japan in 1990 in support of the album, but achieved little success. This led lead singer Robert Ernlund to leave the band, as he was tired of the band's lack of success.

=== Self-titled album and breakup (1991–1993) ===
In late 1990, the band replaced Ernlund with current Candlemass singer Mats Levén, who had previously sung with the band Swedish Erotica and recorded their last album of the 1990s. The self-titled album Treat was released in 1992 and again failed to gain any success for the band and led to the band's break-up on 26 March 1993.

=== Reunion (2006–present) ===
In 2005, a compilation album was released called Weapons of Choice, which sold surprisingly well around the world and led to the band reforming with the 1989 line-up plus Nalle Påhlsson on bass. The band then signed a deal with Universal and played at the Sweden Rock Festival on 10 June 2006. On 19 March 2010, the band released their reunion album Coup de Grace which was a great success for the band and has led to them touring the world for the first time since the 1980s. The album received positive reviews from the press. In July 2014, Treat played the Väsby Rock festival in Upplands Väsby, Sweden. Treat released their album, Ghost of Graceland on 13 April 2016. Their eighth album, Tunguska, was released in 2018. Their latest album to date, The Endgame, was released in 2022.

== Members ==
Current members

- Anders "Gary" Wikström – guitars, backing vocals (1981–1993, 2006–present), keyboards (1981–1989)
- Robert Ernlund – lead vocals (1981–1991, 2006–present)
- Jamie Borger – drums, backing vocals (1987–1993, 2006–present)
- Patrick "Green" Appelgren – keyboards, synthesizer, piano, backing vocals (1989–1993, 2006–present), guitars (2006–present)
- Nalle Påhlsson – bass guitar, backing vocals (2006–2012, 2019–Present)

Former members

- Leif "Lillen" Liljegren – guitar, backing vocals (1981–1988)
- Mats "Dalton" Dahlberg – drums (1983–1985)
- Thomas "Tomas" Lind – bass (1983–1984)
- Ken "Siwan" Siewertson – bass guitar, backing vocals (1984–1989), keyboards (1985)
- Leif Sundin – drums (1985–1987)
- Joakim "Joe" Larsson – bass guitar, backing vocals (1989–1993)
- Mats Levén – lead vocals (1991–1993)
- Fredrik Thomander – bass guitar, backing vocals (2012–2016)
- Pontus Egberg – bass guitar, backing vocals (2016–2019)

Timeline

== Discography ==
=== Studio albums ===
- Scratch and Bite (24 February 1985 Mercury Records)
- The Pleasure Principle (2 May 1986 Mercury Records)
- Dreamhunter (March 1987 Mercury Records)
- Organized Crime (29 October 1989 Vertigo Records)
- Treat (1992 Vertigo Records)
- Coup de Grace (19 March 2010 Frontiers Music)
- Ghost of Graceland (15 April 2016 Frontiers Music)
- Tunguska (14 September 2018 Frontiers Music)
- The Endgame (8 April 2022 Frontiers Music)
- The Wild Card (21 November 2025 Frontiers Music)

=== Compilation albums ===
- Treat (UK compilation) (1989)
- Weapons of Choice (2006)

=== Others ===
- Muscle in Motion - Bootleg/Studio leftovers (1993)
- Scratch and Bite (Remaster) + Live at FireFest DVD (2008)
- The Road More or Less Travelled Digipack DVD/CD (2017)

=== Singles and promos ===
- 1984 - "Too Wild" / "On the Outside" *
- 1984 - "You Got Me" / "Danger Games" *
- 1985 - "We Are One" / "Hidin'"
- 1985 - "Get You on the Run" / "Hidin'" (Japan only)
- 1985 - "Ride Me High" / "Steal Your Heart Away" **
- 1986 - "Rev It Up" / "Fallen Angel"
- 1986 - "Waiting Game" / "Strike Without a Warning"
- 1987 - "Best of Me" / "Tush" **
- 1987 - "You're the One I Want" / "Save Yourself"
- 1988 - "World of Promises" / "One Way to Glory"
- 1989 - "Ready for the Takin'" / "Stay Away"
- 1989 - "Party All Over" / "Hunger"
- 1992 - "Learn to Fly" / "We're All Right Now"
- 2006 - "I Burn for You"
