= Stockholm Records =

Swedish record label

- Parent company: Universal Music Group
- Founded: 1992; 33 years ago Sweden
- Founder: Ola Håkansson; Alexander Bard
- Status: unknown
- Distributor(s): PolyGram
- Genre: Various

Stockholm Records is a Swedish subsidiary of Universal Music Group, founded in 1992, and known for signing musicians such as Army of Lovers and E-Type.

== Overview ==
The boutique label was originally launched in 1992 as an independent record company by its Swedish founders Ola Håkansson and Alexander Bard in partnership with the original distributor and investor PolyGram in London.

Håkansson and Bard ran the company for the first six years, achieving global success with multi-platinum-selling artists like Army of Lovers, The Cardigans, A-Teens, E-Type and Lisa Miskovsky. Another noteworthy signing during this period was Johan Renck, who was originally signed under the artist name Stakka Bo but later became far more famous as a music video director, working for artists like Madonna, Beyoncé and Robbie Williams. Johan Lagerlöf also produced and engineered for the label.

Håkansson and Bard sold their shares in Stockholm Records to Universal Music Group in 1998, after which the company was folded into Universal Music as a boutique label.

Stockholm Records has often been referred to as a model for other music production companies in continental Europe, with the successful and market-dominating Danish enterprise Copenhagen Records and Swedish production powerhouses Cheiron and Murlyn Music Group as obvious examples.

== See also ==
- TEN Music Group
- List of record labels
