= Sveinn Rúnar Sigurðsson =

Icelandic songwriter and music producer (born 1976)

- Also known as: SiRiS
- Born: 24 December 1976 (age 49)
- Origin: Reykjavík, Iceland
- Genres: EDM; classical; pop; rock; folk
- Occupations: Songwriter; music producer; medical doctor
- Years active: 1992–present

Sveinn Rúnar Sigurðsson (born 24 December 1976 in Reykjavík) is an Icelandic songwriter, music producer, and medical doctor, best known for having composed two Eurovision Song Contest entries for Iceland, "Heaven" by Jónsi in 2004 and "Valentine Lost" by Eiríkur Hauksson in 2007. He has also composed music for Chinese action film Wings Over Everest.

== Personal life ==
Sveinn resides in Sweden and Norway, and also works partly in Moscow, Russia. He holds a doctorate in medicine and in stock trading, and is fluent in the Icelandic, English, Russian, and Hungarian languages.

== Career ==
Sveinn has studied piano under Ferenc Utassy, Jon Sigurdsson, Pavel Manazek and since the age of 16 has composed music in styles ranging from classical music to folk, pop, rock and EDM.

His first involvement with Eurovision came with his first participation in the Icelandic national final, Söngvakeppnin, in 2003. He composed the song "Með þér" by Guðrún Árný Karlsdóttir and Dísella Lárusdóttir, making it to the final, and ever since has been a regular in Söngvakeppnin. He has penned the entries for famous artists such as Birgitta Haukdal, Eiríkur Hauksson, Magni Ásgeirsson, Jógvan Hansen, among others. He is also the holder of the record for most Söngvakeppnin participations.

Since 2017, he uses the pseudonym SiRiS for his pop and EDM works. He continued writing for Aron Hannes, after their successful Söngvakeppnin collaboration, releasing two singles, "Sumarnótt" and "Morgunkoss" . He also wrote various other tracks using his real name, including Björgvin Halldórsson's "Hjá mér um jólin" . Using the pseudonym SiRiS, he has composed songs for leading artists in Iceland as well as for artists abroad. Among Icelandic artists, he has written for Dísella Lárusdóttir, Steinar, Yohanna, Íris Hólm, Ragnheiður Gröndal, Kalli Bjarni, Aron Hannes, Birgitta Haukdal, Eiríkur Hauksson, Magni Ásgeirsson, and Björgvin Halldórsson. Among foreign artists, he has written for Eivør, Kristel Lisberg, Kristina Skoubo Bærendsen, Jógvan Hansen, and Paula Valentaitė.

His song "Heaven", which represented Iceland at the Eurovision Song Contest 2004, was covered in Afrikaans by Tobi Jooste as "Kaapstad". The song was well received and in 2006 won the South African Music Awards for "Cover of the Year". Sveinn received his award at a press conference in Finland the following year.

He rarely performs in public, but among his performances he has either recorded or played Edvard Grieg's Piano Concerto, Richard Addinsell's Warsaw Concerto, Frédéric Chopin's Etudes Op. 25 and various Rachmaninoff compositions. In an interview in Istanbul, Turkey, he cited Sergei Rachmaninoff as his favorite composer.

Besides his involvement in pop and classical music, he has also composed music featuring Kristina Bærendsen for Chinese action film Wings Over Everest, written and directed by Fay Yu, which will be released on 15 November 2019.

== Eurovision Song Contest ==
=== Entries in the Eurovision Song Contest ===
Year	Country	Song	Artist	Songwriters	Final		Semifinal	
Year	Country	Song	Artist	Songwriters	Place	Points	Place	Points
2004	Iceland	"Heaven"	Jónsi	Sveinn Rúnar Sigurðsson, Magnús Þór Sigmundsson	19th	16	Automatic finalist	
2007	Iceland	"Valentine Lost"	Eiríkur Hauksson	Sveinn Rúnar Sigurðsson, Peter Fenner	Failed to qualify		13th	77

=== Entries in Eurovision pre-selections ===
==== Söngvakeppnin (Iceland) ====
- 2003: "Með þér" by Guðrún Árný Karlsdóttir & Dísella Lárusdóttir, Final
- 2006: "100% hamingja" by Heiða, Final
- 2006: "Útópía" by Dísella Lárusdóttir, 5th
- 2006: "Mynd af þér" by Birgitta Haukdal, 4th
- 2007: "Draumur" by Hreimur Heimisson, Semifinal
- 2007: "Ég les í lófa þínum" by Eiríkur Hauksson, 1st
- 2012: "Hugarró" by Magni Ásgeirsson, 3rd
- 2012: "Leyndarmál" by Íris Hólm, Semifinal
- 2012: "Stund með þér" by Rósa Birgitta Ísfeld, Final
- 2013: "Ekki líta undan" by Magni Ásgeirsson, Final
- 2013: "Til þín" by Jógvan Hansen & Stefanía Svavarsdóttir, Final
- 2013: "Augnablik" by Erna Hrönn Ólafsdóttir, Semifinal
- 2015: "Augnablik" by Stefania Svavarsdóttir, 6th (Semifinal)
- 2017: "Tonight" by Aron Hannes, 3rd
- 2018: "Gold Digger" by Aron Hannes, 4th
- 2019: "Mama Said" by Kristina Skoubo Bærendsen, 5th
- 2022: "Keep It Cool" by Suncity and Sanna, Semifinal

==== Eurovizijos (Lithuania) ====
- 2018: "1 2 3" by Paula, 6th
- 2018: "Turn It Up" by Germantė Kinderytė, 12th (Quarterfinal)
