= Iceland in the Eurovision Song Contest 2007 =

- Eurovision Song Contest 2007
- Participating broadcaster: Ríkisútvarpið (RÚV)
- Country: Iceland
- Selection process: Söngvakeppni Sjónvarpsins 2007
- Selection date: 17 February 2007

Competing entry
- Song: "Valentine Lost"
- Artist: Eiríkur Hauksson
- Songwriters: Sveinn Rúnar Sigurðsson; Peter Fenner

Placement
- Semi-final result: Failed to qualify (13th)

Participation chronology

Iceland was represented at the Eurovision Song Contest 2007 with the song "Valentine Lost", written by Sveinn Rúnar Sigurðsson and Peter Fenner, and performed by Eiríkur Hauksson. The Icelandic participating broadcaster, Ríkisútvarpið (RÚV), selected its entry through Söngvakeppni Sjónvarpsins 2007. The selection consisted of three semi-finals and a final, held on 20 January, 27 January, 3 February, and 17 February 2007, respectively. Eight songs competed in each semi-final with the top three as selected by a public televote advancing to the final. In the final, "Ég les í lófa þínum" performed by Eiríkur Hauksson emerged as the winner exclusively through public televoting. Hauksson previously represented Iceland in 1986 as part of the group ICY and Norway in 1991 as part of the group Just 4 Fun, placing sixteenth and seventeenth with the songs "Gleðibankinn" and "Mrs. Thompson", respectively. The song was later translated from Icelandic to English for the Eurovision Song Contest and was titled "Valentine Lost".

Iceland competed in the semi-final of the Eurovision Song Contest which took place on 10 May 2007. Performing during the show in position 5, "Valentine Lost" was not announced among the top 10 entries of the semi-final and therefore did not qualify to compete in the final. It was later revealed that Iceland placed thirteenth out of the 28 participating countries in the semi-final with 77 points.

== Background ==
Prior to the 2007 contest, Ríkisútvarpið (RÚV) had participated in the Eurovision Song Contest representing Iceland nineteen times since its first entry in 1986. Its best placing in the contest to this point was second, achieved in 1999 with the song "All Out of Luck" performed by Selma. Since the introduction of a semi-final to the format of the Eurovision Song Contest in 2004, Iceland has, to this point, yet to qualify to the final. In 2006, "Congratulations" performed by Silvía Night failed to qualify to the final.

As part of its duties as participating broadcaster, RÚV organises the selection of its entry in the Eurovision Song Contest and broadcasts the event in the country. The broadcaster confirmed its intentions to participate at the 2007 contest on 21 October 2006. In 2004 and 2005, RÚV opted to internally select its entry for the contest. In 2006, RÚV used a national final to select its entry, a method that continued for its 2007 participation.

== Before Eurovision ==
=== Söngvakeppni Sjónvarpsins 2007 ===
Söngvakeppni Sjónvarpsins 2007 was the national final format developed by RÚV in order to select its entry for the Eurovision Song Contest 2007. The four shows in the competition were hosted by Ragnhildur Steinunn Jónsdóttir and all took place at the BaseCamp Studio in Reykjavík. The semi-finals and final were broadcast on RÚV and online at the broadcaster's official website ruv.is.

==== Format ====
Twenty-four songs in total competed in Söngvakeppni Sjónvarpsins 2007 where the winner was determined after three semi-finals and a final. Eight songs competed in each semi-final on 20 January, 27 January and 3 February 2007. The top three songs from each semi-final qualified to the final which took place on 3 February 2007. The results of the semi-finals and final were determined by 100% public televoting. All songs were required to be performed in Icelandic during all portions of the competition, however, it will be up to the winning composers to decide the language that will be performed at the Eurovision Song Contest in Helsinki.

==== Competing entries ====
On 21 October 2006, RÚV opened the submission period for interested songwriters to submit their entries until the deadline on 16 November 2006. Songwriters were required to be Icelandic, possess Icelandic citizenship or have permanent residency in Iceland by 1 October 2006, and had the right to submit up to three entries. At the close of the submission deadline, 188 entries were received. A selection committee was formed in order to select the top twenty-four entries. The twenty-four competing artists and songs were revealed by the broadcaster on 15 January 2007. Among the competing artists were previous Icelandic Eurovision entrants Eiríkur Hauksson, who represented Iceland in 1986 and Norway in 1991 as part of ICY and Just 4 Fun, respectively, and Jónsi, who represented Iceland in 2004. Matthías Matthíasson was initially announced as the performer of the song "Eldur", however, RÚV announced on the same day that his song would be performed by Friðrik Ómar Hjörleifsson instead.

Artist	Song	Songwriter(s)
Aðalheiður Ólafsdóttir	"Enginn eins og þú"	Kristján Hreinsson, Roland Hartwell
Alexander Aron Guðbjartsson	"Villtir skuggar"	Kristján Hreinsson, Gunnar Jóhannsson
Andri Bergmann	"Bjarta brosið"	Kristján Hreinsson, Torfa Ólafsson
Bergþór Smári	"Þú gafst mér allt"	Bergþór Smári
Bríet Sunna Valdemarsdóttir	"Blómabörn"	Magnús Þór Sigmundsson
Davíð Smári Harðarsson	"Leiðin liggur heim"	Kristján Hreinsson, Elvar Gottskálksson
Eiríkur Hauksson	"Ég les í lófa þínum"	Kristján Hreinsson, Sveinn Rúnar Sigurðsson
Erna Hrönn Ólafsdóttir	"Örlagadís"	Roland Hartwell, Kristján Hreinsson
Finnur Jóhannsson	"Allt eða ekki neitt"	Torfa Ólafsson, Eðvarð Lárusson, Þorkel Olgeirsson
Friðrik Ómar Hjörleifsson	"Eldur"	Ingibjörg Gunnarsdóttir, Grétar Örvarsson, Kristján Grétarsson
Guðrún Lísa	"Eitt símtal í burtu"	Roland Hartwell, Kristján Hreinsson
Hafsteinn Þórólfsson	"Þú tryllir mig"	Hafsteinn Þórólfsson, Hannes Pál Pálsson
Helgi Rafn Ingvarsson	"Vetur"	Magnús Guðmann Jónsson
Hera Björk Þórhallsdóttir	"Mig dreymdi"	Ingólf Steinsson, Oskar Guðnason
Hjalti Ómar Ágústsson	"Fyrir þig"	Torfa Ólafsson, Þorkel Olgeirsson
Hljómsveitin Von	"Ég hef fengið nóg"	Ellert H. Jóhansson, Gunnar I. Sigurðsson, Sigurður Björnsson, Sigurpáll Aðalsteinsson, Sorin M. Lazar, Magnús Þór Sigmundsson
Hreimur Heimisson	"Draumur"	Kristján Hreinsson, Sveinn Rúnar Sigurðsson
Jónsi	"Segðu mér"	Trausta Bjarnason, Ragnheiði Bjarnsdóttir
Matthías Matthíasson	"Húsin hafa augu"	Þormar Ingimarsson, Kristján Hreinsson
Ragnheiður Eiríksdóttir	"Ég og heilinn minn"	Ragnheiður Eiriksdóttir, Gunnar L. Herlmarsson
Richard Scobie	"Dásamleg raun"	Bergstein Björgúlfsson
Sigurjón Brink	"Áfram"	Sigurjón Brink, Bryndís Sunna Valdimarsdóttir, Jóhannes Ásbjörnsson
Snorri Snorrason	"Orðin komu aldrei"	Kristján Hreinsson, Óskar Guðnason
Soffía Karlsdóttir	"Júnínótt"	Ómar Ragnarsson

==== Semi-finals ====
The three semi-finals took place on 20 January, 27 January and 3 February 2007. In each semi-final eight acts presented their entries, and the top two entries voted upon solely by public televoting proceeded to the final.

Semi-final 1 – 20 January 2007
R/O	Artist	Song	Result
1	Bríet Sunna Valdemarsdóttir	"Blómabörn"	Qualified
2	Snorri Snorrason	"Orðin komu aldrei"	—N/a
3	Aðalheiður Ólafsdóttir	"Enginn eins og þú"	—N/a
4	Finnur Jóhannsson	"Allt eða ekki neitt"	—N/a
5	Sigurjón Brink	"Áfram"	Qualified
6	Bergþór Smári	"Þú gafst mér allt"	—N/a
7	Hreimur Heimisson	"Draumur"	—N/a
8	Matthías Matthíasson	"Húsin hafa augu"	Qualified

Semi-final 2 – 27 January 2007
R/O	Artist	Song	Result
1	Hljómsveitin Von	"Ég hef fengið nóg"	—N/a
2	Richard Scobie	"Dásamleg raun"	—N/a
3	Friðrik Ómar Hjörleifsson	"Eldur"	Qualified
4	Hera Björk Þórhallsdóttir	"Mig dreymdi"	—N/a
5	Jónsi	"Segðu mér"	Qualified
6	Guðrún Lísa	"Eitt símtal í burtu"	—N/a
7	Hjalti Ómar Ágústsson	"Fyrir þig"	—N/a
8	Eiríkur Hauksson	"Ég les í lófa þínum"	Qualified

Semi-final 3 – 3 February 2007
R/O	Artist	Song	Result
1	Erna Hrönn Ólafsdóttir	"Örlagadís"	—N/a
2	Alexander Aron Guðbjartsson	"Villtir skuggar"	—N/a
3	Soffía Karlsdóttir	"Júnínótt"	—N/a
4	Davíð Smári Harðarsson	"Leiðin liggur heim"	—N/a
5	Andri Bergmann	"Bjarta brosið"	Qualified
6	Helgi Rafn Ingvarsson	"Vetur"	—N/a
7	Ragnheiður Eiríksdóttir	"Ég og heilinn minn"	Qualified
8	Hafsteinn Þórólfsson	"Þú tryllir mig"	Qualified

==== Final ====
The final took place on 17 February 2007 where the nine entries that qualified from the preceding three semi-finals competed. The winner, "Ég les í lófa þínum" performed Eiríkur Hauksson, was determined solely by televoting. In addition to the performances of the competing artists, the interval act featured guest performances by Mihai Trăistariu, who represented Romania in 2006 with the song "Tornerò".

Final – 17 February 2007
R/O	Artist	Song	Place
1	Friðrik Ómar Hjörleifsson	"Eldur"	2
2	Ragnheiður Eiríksdóttir	"Ég og heilinn minn"	—
3	Andri Bergmann	"Bjarta brosið"	—
4	Eiríkur Hauksson	"Ég les í lófa þínum"	1
5	Bríet Sunna Valdemarsdóttir	"Blómabörn"	—
6	Matthías Matthíasson	"Húsin hafa augu"	—
7	Jónsi	"Segðu mér"	—
8	Hafsteinn Þórólfsson	"Þú tryllir mig"	3
9	Sigurjón Brink	"Áfram"	—

=== Preparation ===
On 12 March 2007, it was announced that "Ég les í lófa þínum" would be performed in English at the Eurovision Song Contest and would be titled "Valentine Lost" with lyrics by Peter Fenner. The official music video for the song was released on 15 March 2007.

== At Eurovision ==
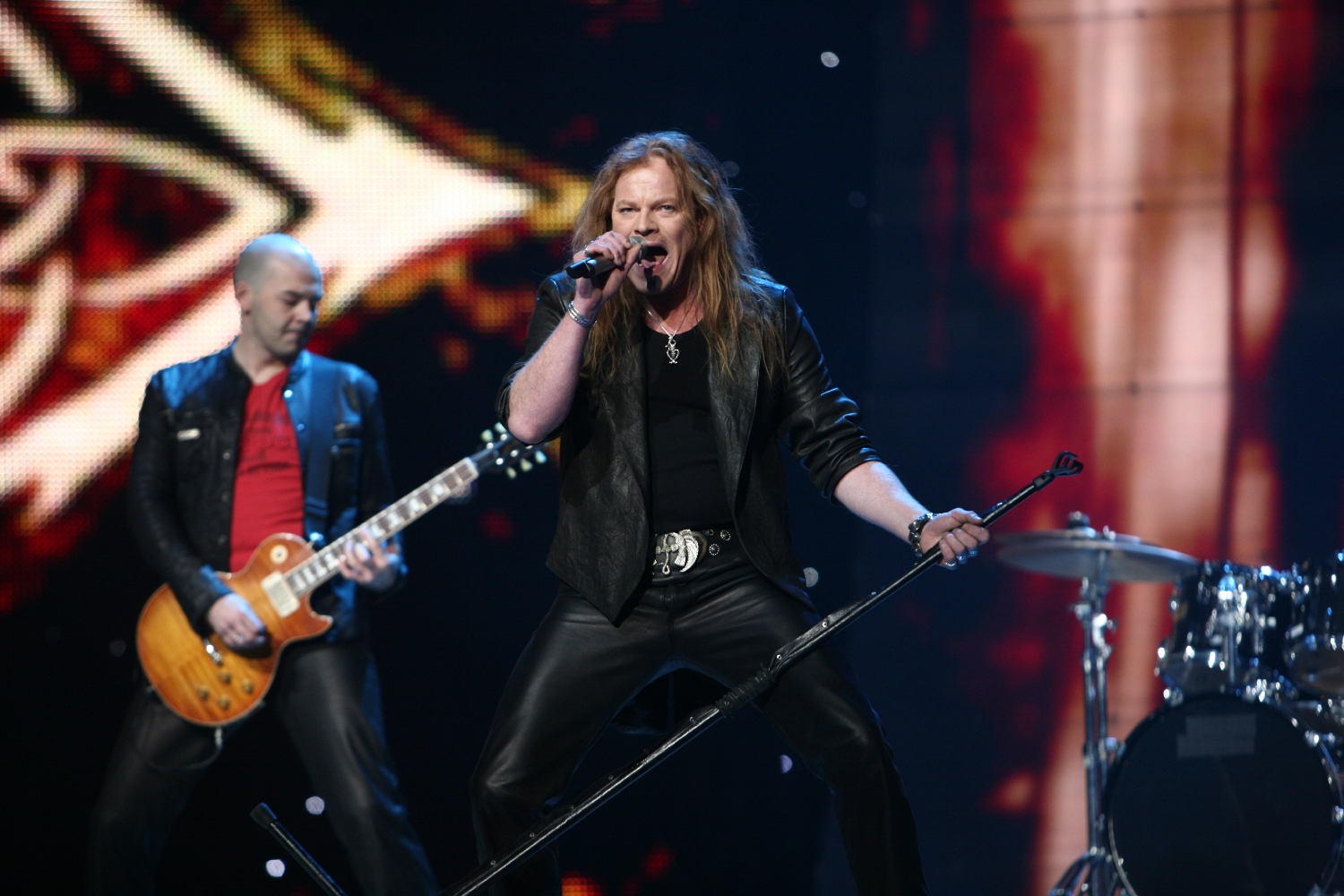
Eiríkur Hauksson performing at the Eurovision Song Contest

According to Eurovision rules, all nations with the exceptions of the host country, the "Big Four" (France, Germany, Spain, and the United Kingdom) and the ten highest placed finishers in the 2006 contest are required to qualify from the semi-final on 10 May 2007 in order to compete for the final on 12 May 2007. On 12 March 2007, a special allocation draw was held which determined the running order for the semi-final. Iceland was drawn to perform in position 5, following the entry from Belarus and before the entry from Georgia.

The semi-final and the final were broadcast in Iceland on RÚV with commentary by Sigmar Guðmundsson. RÚV appointed Ragnhildur Steinunn Jónsdóttir as its spokesperson to announce the Icelandic votes during the final.

=== Semi-final ===
Eiríkur Hauksson took part in technical rehearsals on 5 and 6 May, followed by dress rehearsals on 9 and 10 May. The Icelandic performance featured Eiríkur Hauksson dressed in a black outfit and performing in a band set-up. The LED screens transitioned from white spots pointing downwards to interwoven Celtic chain symbol in blue and white colours. The musicians that joined Eiríkur Hauksson were members of the Svenster Bling Band: Axel Þórir Þórissson, Benedikt Brynleifsson, Gunnar Þór Jónsson, Sigurbjörn Þór Þórsson, and Stefán Steindórsson.

At the end of the show, Iceland was not announced among the top 10 entries in the semi-final and therefore failed to qualify to compete in the final. It was later revealed that Iceland placed thirteenth in the semi-final, receiving a total of 77 points.

=== Voting ===
Below is a breakdown of points awarded to Iceland and awarded by Iceland in the semi-final and grand final of the contest. The nation awarded its 12 points to Hungary in the semi-final and to Finland in the final of the contest.

==== Points awarded to Iceland ====
Points awarded to Iceland (Semi-final)
Score	Country
12 points	Finland; Norway; Sweden
10 points	Denmark; Hungary
8 points	
7 points	
6 points	Estonia; Latvia
5 points	Lithuania
4 points	
3 points	Belarus
2 points	
1 point	Georgia

==== Points awarded by Iceland ====
Points awarded by Iceland (Semi-final)
Score	Country
12 points	Hungary
10 points	Serbia
8 points	Denmark
7 points	Norway
6 points	Andorra
5 points	Latvia
4 points	Belarus
3 points	Turkey
2 points	Poland
1 point	Israel

Points awarded by Iceland (Final)
Score	Country
12 points	Finland
10 points	Sweden
8 points	Hungary
7 points	Serbia
6 points	Ukraine
5 points	Greece
4 points	Belarus
3 points	Turkey
2 points	Germany
1 point	Russia
