= Jooste =

Jooste is an Afrikaans language surname. Notable people with the surname include:

- Leon Jooste (born 1969), Namibian politician and businessman
- Markus Jooste (born 1961), South African businessman
- Nick Jooste (born 1997), Australian rugby player
- Pamela Jooste, South African novelist
- Tobi Jooste, South African singer, model, writer and television personality
- Jayson Jooste (Born 1993), South African graphic designer and art director
