= Birgitta Haukdal =

Icelandic singer (born 1979)

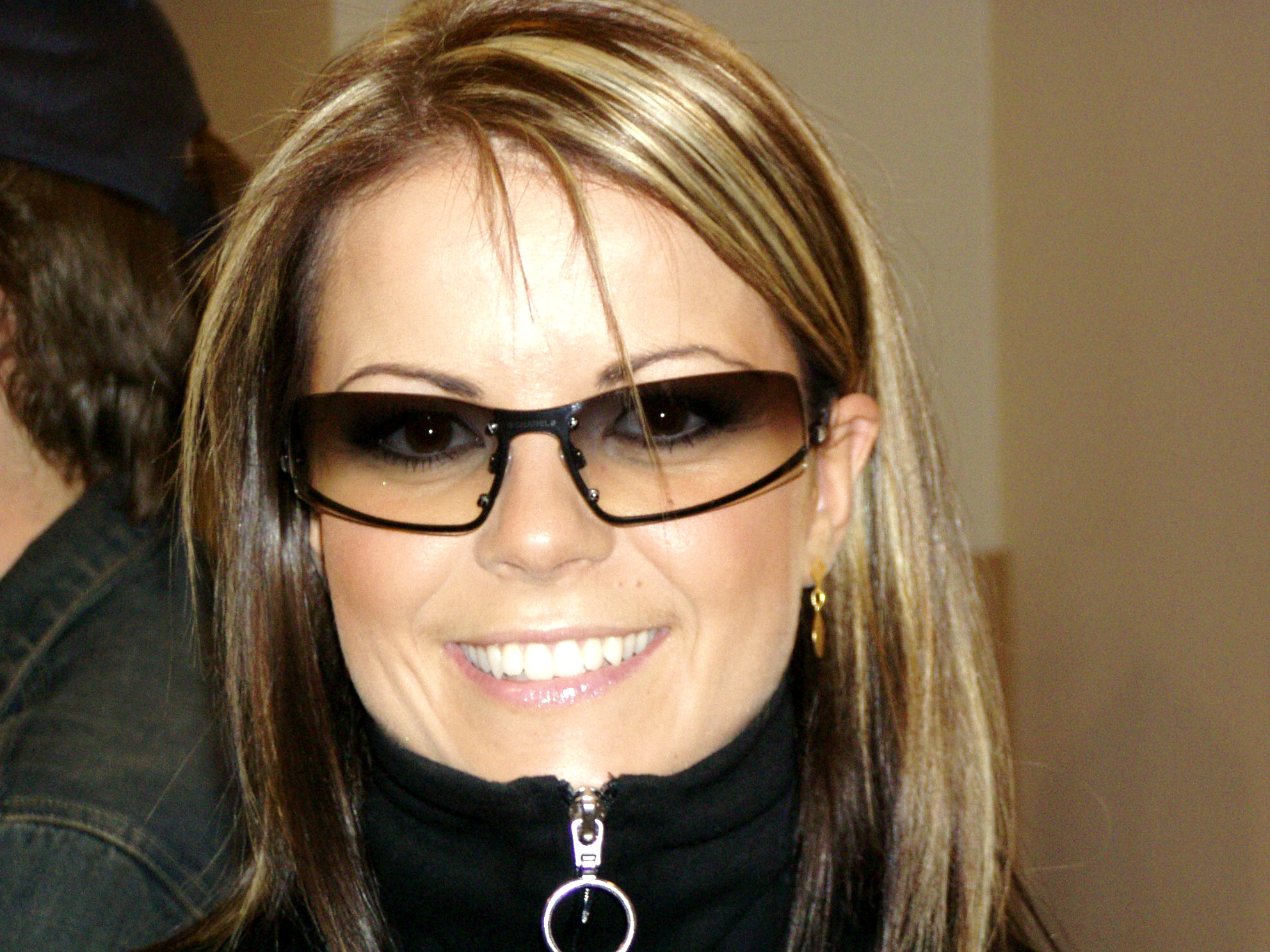
- Birgitta Haukdal in 2003

Background information
- Also known as: Birgitta
- Born: Birgitta Haukdal Brynjarsdóttir; 28 July 1979 (age 46); Húsavík, Iceland
- Genres: Pop; pop rock
- Occupations: Singer; songwriter; record producer; dancer
- Instrument: Vocals
- Years active: 1999–present
- Labels: Skífan; Sena
- Member of: Írafár

Birgitta Haukdal Brynjarsdóttir (born 28 July 1979), known mononymously as Birgitta, is an Icelandic singer. She rose to domestic media prominence as the lead singer of pop band Írafár. She represented Iceland in the Eurovision Song Contest 2003 with the song "Open Your Heart", tying in eighth place with the Spanish contestant Beth with 81 points.

== Life and career ==
For most of her life she has lived in the northern part of Iceland. In November 1999, Birgitta replaced the then lead vocalist of the pop group Írafár. They released their first single "Hvar er ég?" ("Where am I?") in the summer of 2000, followed by two more singles in 2001. The band signed a recording contract with Iceland's biggest record company, Skífan in 2002, releasing their first album "Allt sem ég sé" ("All I see") in early November. It is Iceland's fastest selling pop album of the last 25 years, achieving platinum status by the Félag hljómplötuframleiðenda.

As of 2003, Birgitta Haukdal is one of the most popular female pop vocalists in Iceland. She has been voted Pop Star of the Year and Performer of the Year. In 2003, she won the national final for the Eurovision Song Contest 2003 with her song "Segðu mér allt". At the contest, she sang the English–language version of the song, "Open Your Heart", placing eighth with 81 points.

She competed in the Icelandic pre-qualifying for the Eurovision Song Contest 2006, with the song "Mynd Af Þér" or "Picture of you" and, in a duo with Magni Ásgeirsson, reached the finals of the Icelandic qualifying for Eurovision Song Contest 2008 with the song, "Núna veit ég" but did not win. She participated again in 2013, singing Meðal Andanna.

== Personal life ==
Birgitta married her long–term boyfriend Benedikt Einarsson on 23 October 2008 in Reykjavík.

== Awards and nominations ==
| Award | Year | Category | Nominated | Result |
|---|---|---|---|---|
| Icelandic Music Awards | 2003 | Pop Star of the Year | Birgitta | Won |
| Icelandic Music Awards | 2003 | Performer of the Year | Birgitta | Won |

== See also ==
- Eurovision Song Contest 2003
- Iceland in the Eurovision Song Contest
- Iceland in the Eurovision Song Contest 2003
- Iceland in the Eurovision Song Contest 2006
- Iceland in the Eurovision Song Contest 2008

| Preceded by Two Tricky with "Angel" | Iceland in the Eurovision Song Contest; 2003 | Succeeded by Jónsi with "Heaven" |
