= Félag hljómplötuframleiðenda =

Icelandic trade association

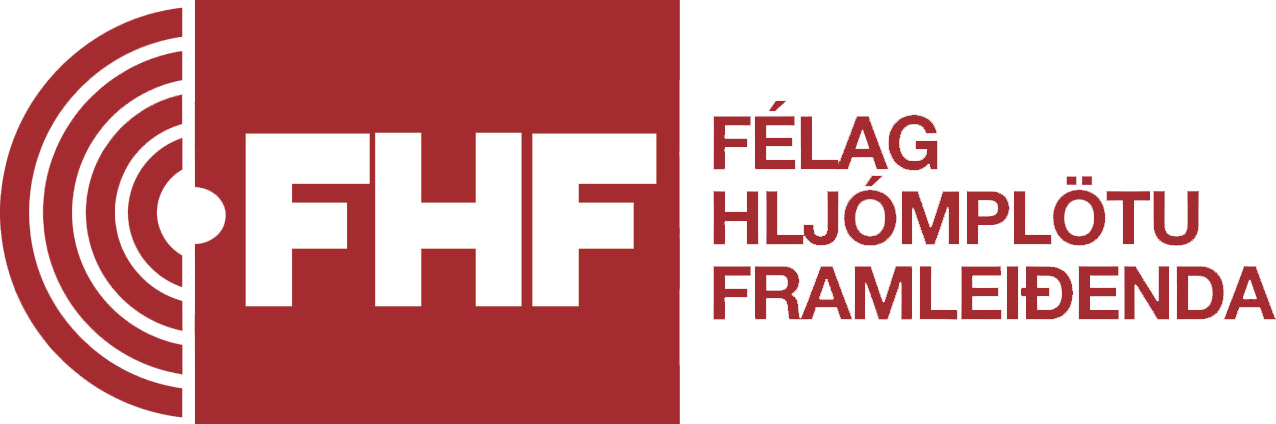
- Abbreviation: FHF
- Type: Nonprofit organization
- Purpose: Trade organization protecting record publishing companies' interests
- Headquarters: Reykjavík
- Executive Director: Eiður Arnarsson
- Affiliations: IFPI
- Website: fhf.is

The Félag hljómplötuframleiðenda (FHF; English: Association of Record Manufacturers), also known as the IFPI Iceland, or the Icelandic National Group of IFPI, is a trade association representing and protecting the rights of record publishing companies in Iceland. It also serves as the Icelandic branch of the International Federation of the Phonographic Industry (IFPI). FHF is responsible for publishing the weekly Tónlistinn charts, which include the Tónlistinn – Lög chart for singles and the Tónlistinn – Plötur chart for albums. Additionally, FHF provides music recording certification in Iceland.

FHF operates as a division of Samband flytjenda og hljómplötuframleiðenda (SFH), an organization approved by the Icelandic Ministry for Education and Cultural Affairs. SFH primarily handles revenue distribution to performers of sound recordings and acts as the registration authority for the International Standard Recording Code (ISRC) in Iceland.

== Record charts ==
FHF publishes two weekly top 40 charts: Tónlistinn – Lög for singles and Tónlistinn – Plötur for albums. The singles chart is based on airplay from radio stations Bylgjan, FM957, Xið 977, Rás 2, and K100, along with streaming data from Spotify. The albums chart is based on both physical sales and Spotify streaming. The exact charting methods are not disclosed, and no archive is available. Streaming data is provided by Ranger Charts.

FHF has also been publishing yearly top 100 charts since 2016.

== Recording certification ==
FHF awards record certifications for both albums and singles, with thresholds determined by the release date of the album or single.

=== Album certification ===
Album certification thresholds are based on physical sales, downloads, and streaming. Platinum certification is awarded for multiples of the platinum level, although as of 2022, only about ten titles have achieved multi-platinum status. In recent years, these albums included Írafár's Allt sem ég sé and Hafdís Huld's Vögguvísur.

While the thresholds before 1975 are unclear, there is evidence suggesting that gold records were awarded for sales of 2,500 units.

Album certification thresholds
Release data	From 1975 to 1986	From 1987 to 1993	From 1994 to 2014	From 2015 to 2017	From 2018
Gold	5,000	3,000	5,000	3,500	2,500
Platinum	10,000	7,500	10,000	7,000	5,000
Diamond	—	—	—	—	50,000

=== Single certification ===
Single certification thresholds are based solely on streaming. Platinum certification is awarded for multiples of the platinum level.

Single certification thresholds
Release date	Before 2021	From 2021
Gold	500,000	750,000
Platinum	1,000,000	1,500,000

=== Music video certification ===
Music video certifications were awarded from at least 2009 until June 2013. The certification thresholds were set at 5,000 copies for Gold and 10,000 for Platinum.

== Other activities ==
FHF actively protects the copyrights of music publishers in Iceland. For instance, in 2007–2008, FHF was among the organizations that sued the owner of the file-sharing website Istorrent, demanding its closure. Although an injunction was granted and the website was initially closed, the Supreme Court later dismissed the case, leading to the website's reopening. In 2010, FHF's local partners sued Istorrent again, and the Supreme Court approved both an injunction and damages against Istorrent.

FHF also engages in other activities to support the music industry. For example, in 2020, FHF collaborated on a report about the effects of COVID-19 on the Icelandic music industry. Additionally, FHF was one of the founding members of the music center Tónlistarmiðstöð, which was established in August 2023 and officially opened in April 2024.
