= Artch =

Norwegian heavy metal band

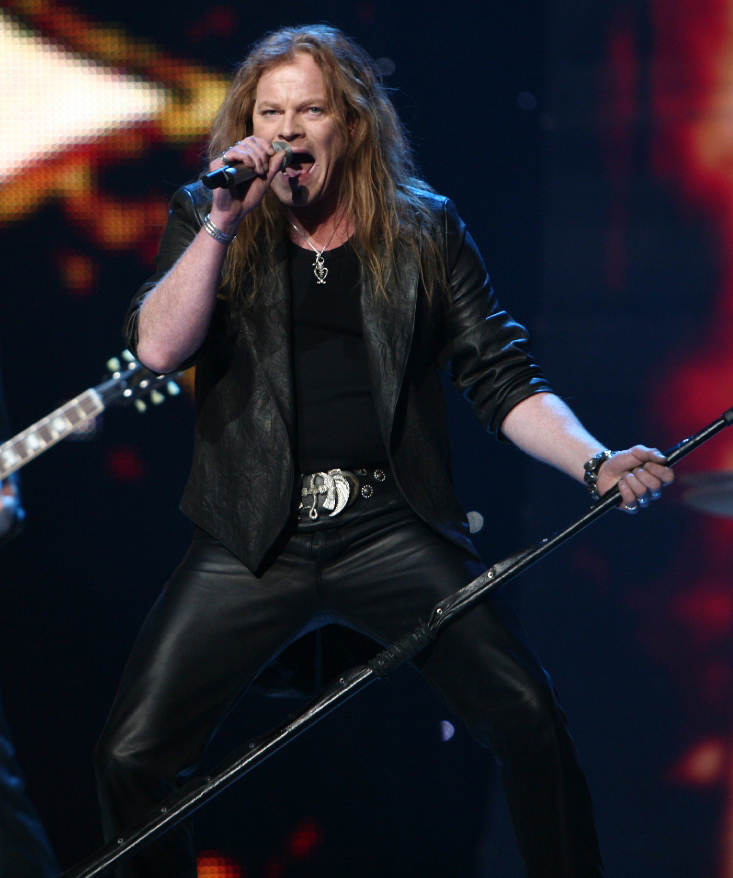

Background information
- Origin: Sarpsborg, Norway
- Genres: Heavy metal, power metal
- Years active: 1983–present
- Labels: Metal Blade
- Members: Eirikur Hauksson; Cato André Olsen; Geir Nilssen; Bernt Jansen; Jørn Jamissen
- Past members: Gudmund Bolsgård; Lars Fladeby; Espen Hoff
- Website: www.artch.net

Artch is a heavy metal band from Sarpsborg, Norway. Initially formed in 1983 by guitarist Cato André Olsen and bass player Bernt Jansen, in 1984 guitarist Geir Nilssen, drummer Jørn Jamissen and vocalist Lars Fladeby all joined the band but they had formerly been with a local rock group called Oxygen. Espen Hoff replaced Fladeby as lead singer in 1985, but he died in a motorcycle accident later that same year, and was replaced by Eiríkur Hauksson in 1986.

Artch released two albums on the American record label Metal Blade that got great reviews, especially in the English heavy metal press, but sales were disappointing. The first album released in 1988, and the second album, For the Sake of Mankind, followed it in 1991. Both got positive reviews by AllMusic, rating the first album at 3 out 5 and the second at 4.5 out 5; comparing the second album to the Metallica discography. Kerrang! rated the first album at 5 out 5.

Drummer Jamissen left the band in 1991 and was replaced by Gudmund Bolsgård. They reformed in 2000 after a prolonged period of inactivity. Their original lineup was reunited again in 2010.

== Discography ==
- Demo (Demo, 1984)
- Time Waits For No One (Demo, 1987)
- Another Return (Metal Blade, 1988)
- "Shoot to Kill" / "Reincarnation" (single, 1988)
- For the Sake of Mankind (Metal Blade, 1991)
- Another Return - Live... And Beyond (DVD, 2004)
