= Istorrent =

BitTorrent metasearch engine

- Website type: Web community
- Headquarters: Iceland
- Area served: Worldwide
- Creator: David Már
- Website: torrent.is
- Launched: 1 May 2005
- Current status: Closed on 19 November 2007, reopened 16 May 2008

Istorrent is an Icelandic Internet community devoted to BitTorrent file sharing. It was founded on 1 May 2005.

On 19 November 2007, the district court ordered the site to be shut down, requested by several copyright holder advocates (SMÁÍS, SÍK, Samband tónskálda og eigenda flutningsréttar and Félag hljómplötuframleiðenda (FHF)). The order was reversed in May 2008 when the Icelandic Supreme Court ruled that plaintiffs had no legal ground to pursue the injunction that brought the tracker down. In 2010, the website was sued again, and the Supreme Court approved both an injunction and damages.
