= Hjálpum þeim =

Single by miscellaneous
- Released: 1985
- Recorded: 1985, 2005
- Genre: Pop
- Length: 5:14
- Label: ???
- Songwriters: Axel Einarsson, Jóhann G. Jóhannsson, Gunnar Þórðarson, and Eyþór Gunnarsson
- Producer: ???

Miscellaneous singles chronology
"Hjálpum þeim" (1985)	"Hjálpum þeim 2005" (2005)

"Hjálpum þeim" (Icelandic for Let’s Help Them) is a song recorded in 1985 by several of the most popular musicians of Iceland to gather funds in order to combat poverty in Africa.
"Hjálpum þeim" contained only the title song and it was rerecorded again in 2005 under the name of "Hjálpum þeim 2005", and then again in English in 2011 under the name "Help Them 2011" because of the crisis in Eastern Africa.

== Track listing ==
Track	Title	Length	Lyrics	Audio clips
01	Hjálpum Þeim	???	link	-

== Personnel ==
- Music: Axel Einarsson.
- Lyrics: Jóhann G. Jóhannsson, Gunnar Þórðarson, and Eyþór Gunnarsson.

Alma Dögg Jóhannsdóttir - backing vocals. Andrew Watkinson - violin. Axel Einarsson - backing vocals. Ásgeir Steingrímsson - trumpet. Björgvin Gíslason - guitar and backing vocals. Björgvin Halldórsson - vocals and backing vocals. Björn Thoroddsen - guitar and backing vocals. Bubbi Morthens - vocals. Carmel Russill - cello. Charles Berthon - violin. Dagur Hilmarsson - backing vocals. Einar Jónsson - backing vocals. Eiríkur Hauksson - vocals and backing vocals. Ellen Kristjánsdóttir - vocals and backing vocals. Eyþór Gunnarsson - keyboard and backing vocals. Flosi Einarsson - backing vocals. Friðrik Karlsson - guitar. G. Hjörtur Howser - backing vocals. Guðrún Sigurðardóttir - cello. Gunnar Þórðarson - backing vocals. Gunnlaugur Briem - drums. Hafsteinn Valgarðsson - backing vocals. Haraldur Þorsteinsson - backing vocals. Helga Möller - vocals and backing vocals. Helgi Björnsson - vocals. Herbert Guðmundsson - vocals and backing vocals. Hildigunnur Halldórsdóttir - violin. Hjalti Gunnlaugsson - backing vocals. Ingólfur Sv. Guðjónsson - backing vocals. Jakob R. Valgarðsson - backing vocals. Jenný Ásmundsdóttir - vocals. Jon Kjell Seljeseth - keyboard. Jóhann G. Jóhannsson vocals and backing vocals. Jóhann Helgason - vocals and backing vocals. Jón Borgar Loftsson - backing vocals. Jón Gústafsson - backing vocals. Jón Þór Gíslason - backing vocals. Kathleen Bearden - violin. Kristinn Svavarsson - saxophone. Kristján Jóhannsson - vocals. Lísa Pálsdóttir - vocals and backing vocals. Magnús Guðmundsson - vocals. Magnús Þór Sigmundsson - vocals and backing vocals. Ólafur Þórarinsson - vocals. Páll Einarsson - cello. Pálmi Gunnarsson - vocals and backing vocals. Pétur Hallgrímsson - backing vocals. Pétur Hjaltested - backing vocals. Pétur Kristjánsson - vocals and backing vocals. Rafn Jónsson - backing vocals. Richard Scobie - vocals and backing vocals. Rúnar Júlíusson - vocals and backing vocals. Rúnar Þórisson - backing vocals. Sigfús Örn Óttarsson - backing vocals. Sigrún Hjálmtýsdóttir - vocals. Sigurður Gröndal - backing vocals. Skúli Sverrisson - bass. Szymon Kuran - violin. Þórður Bogason - backing vocals. Þórhallur Sigurðsson - vocals and backing vocals. Þórhallur Birgisson - violin. Þórir Baldursson - piano. Ívar Sigurbergsson - backing vocals.

== Last version ==
- 2005 - "Hjálpum þeim 2005", 2005 version of the original release.
