= Iceland in the Eurovision Song Contest =

- Eurovision Song Contest
- Participating broadcaster: Ríkisútvarpið (RÚV) (1986-2025)

Participation summary
- Appearances: 37 (28 finals)
- First appearance: 1986
- Last appearance: 2025
- Highest placement: 2nd: 1999, 2009
- Participation history: 1986; 1987; 1988; 1989; 1990; 1991; 1992; 1993; 1994; 1995; 1996; 1997; 1998; 1999; 2000; 2001; 2002; 2003; 2004; 2005; 2006; 2007; 2008; 2009; 2010; 2011; 2012; 2013; 2014; 2015; 2016; 2017; 2018; 2019; ~~2020~~; 2021; 2022; 2023; 2024; 2025; 2026

Related articles
- Söngvakeppnin

External links
- RÚV page
- Iceland's page at Eurovision.com
- For the most recent participation see Iceland in the Eurovision Song Contest 2025

Iceland has been represented at the Eurovision Song Contest 37 times since its debut in 1986. It has missed only three contests since then, in 1998 and 2002, when prevented from competing due to finishing outside qualification places the preceding years, and the 2026 contest due to the inclusion of Israel in the context of the Gaza war. The country's best result is second place, which it achieved with "All Out of Luck" by Selma in 1999 and "Is It True?" by Yohanna in 2009. The Icelandic participating broadcaster in the contest is Ríkisútvarpið (RÚV), which select its entrant with the national competition Söngvakeppnin.

Iceland has achieved a total of seven top ten placements, with the others being "Eitt lag enn" by Stjórnin finishing fourth (1990), "Nei eða já" by Heart 2 Heart seventh (1992), "Open Your Heart" by Birgitta eighth (2003), "Hatrið mun sigra" by Hatari tenth (2019), and "10 Years" by Daði og Gagnamagnið fourth (2021). Since the introduction of the semi-final round in 2004, Iceland has failed to qualify for the final nine times, including four years consecutively (2015–18). To date, Iceland is the only Nordic country that has yet to win the contest.

== Participation ==
Ríkisútvarpið (RÚV) is a full member of the European Broadcasting Union (EBU), thus eligible to participate in the Eurovision Song Contest. It has participated in the contest representing Iceland since its 31st edition in 1986, 20 years after RÚV was founded.

== History ==
Iceland's best result in the contest is second place, which it has achieved twice: in 1999 with the song "All Out of Luck" performed by Selma, beaten by Sweden's "Take Me to Your Heaven" by Charlotte Nilsson, and in 2009 with "Is It True?" performed by Yohanna, beaten by Norway's "Fairytale" by Alexander Rybak.

However, Iceland's worst result in the contest is last place, which has been achieved four times to date: in 1989 when "Það sem enginn sér" by Daníel Ágúst received 0 points, in 2001 when "Angel" by Two Tricky received 3 points, in 2018 when "Our Choice" by Ari Ólafsson received 15 points in the first semi final, and in 2024 when "Scared of Heights" by Hera Björk received 3 points in the first semi final.

With the introduction of semi-finals in 2004, Iceland automatically qualified for the final that year due to Birgitta's eighth place the previous year. In 2008, Iceland reached the final for the first time since then, with "This Is My Life" by Euroband. Iceland qualified for the final in seven consecutive contests between 2008 and 2014 before failing to qualify for the final from 2015 to 2018. In 2019, Hatari brought the country back to the final for the first time since 2014, finishing tenth, which was followed by a fourth-place finish for Daði og Gagnamagnið in 2021, Iceland's joint-second best result to date, and a 23rd-place finish for Systur in 2022. Further non-qualifications came in 2023 and 2024. VÆB brought the country back to the final in 2025 breaking the countries two year non qualification streak. They finished 25th in the final, receiving zero points by the juries. RÚV withdrew from 2026 due to Israel's inclusion.

Despite these mixed fortunes, Iceland is the second most successful country never to have won the contest (behind only Malta).

Sigríður Beinteinsdóttir has participated five times (as a member of a group in 1990 and 1992, as a solo artist in 1994, and as a background vocalist in 1991 and 2006). Hera Björk has also participated five times (as a backing vocalist in 2008, 2009 and 2015, and as a solo artist in 2010 and 2024). Stefán Hilmarsson has participated twice (as a member of a group in 1988 and in a duo with Eyfi in 1991), as have Selma Björnsdóttir (1999 and 2005), Eiríkur Hauksson (as a member of a group in 1986 and as a solo artist in 2007; Eiríkur has additionally participated for Norway in 1991 as a member of Just 4 Fun). Jón Jósep Snæbjörnsson entered as a solo artist in 2004 before participating in a duo with Greta Salóme Stefánsdóttir in 2012; Greta Salóme later entered as a solo artist in 2016.

== Participation overview ==
Table key
1	First place
2	Second place
3	Third place
◁	Last place
◇	Entry selected but did not compete

Year	Artist	Song	Language	Final	Points	Semi	Points
1986	ICY	"Gleðibankinn"	Icelandic	16	19	No semi-finals	
1987	Halla Margrét	"Hægt og hljótt"	Icelandic	16	28	No semi-finals	
1988	Beathoven	"Sókrates"	Icelandic	16	20	No semi-finals	
1989	Daníel	"Það sem enginn sér"	Icelandic	22 ◁	0	No semi-finals	
1990	Stjórnin	"Eitt lag enn"	Icelandic	4	124	No semi-finals	
1991	Stefán and Eyfi	"Nína"	Icelandic	15	26	No semi-finals	
1992	Heart 2 Heart	"Nei eða já"	Icelandic	7	80	No semi-finals	
1993	Inga	"Þá veistu svarið"	Icelandic	13	42	Kvalifikacija za Millstreet	
1994	Sigga	"Nætur"	Icelandic	12	49	No semi-finals	
1995	Bo Halldórsson	"Núna"	Icelandic	15	31	No semi-finals	
1996	Anna Mjöll	"Sjúbídú"	Icelandic	13	51	10	59
1997	Páll Óskar	"Minn hinsti dans"	Icelandic	20	18	No semi-finals	
1999	Selma	"All Out of Luck"	English	2	146	No semi-finals	
2000	August and Telma	"Tell Me!"	English	12	45	No semi-finals	
2001	Two Tricky	"Angel"	English	22 ◁	3	No semi-finals	
2003	Birgitta	"Open Your Heart"	English	8	81	No semi-finals	
2004	Jónsi	"Heaven"	English	19	16	Top 11 in 2003 contest (Note: According to the then-Eurovision rules, the top ten non-Big Four countries from the previous year along with the Big Four automatically qualified for the Grand Final without having to compete in semi-finals. For example, if Germany and France placed inside the top ten, the 11th and 12th spots were advanced to next year's Grand Final along with all countries ranked in the top ten.)	
2005	Selma	"If I Had Your Love"	English	Failed to qualify		16	52
2006	Silvía Night	"Congratulations"	English	Failed to qualify		13	62
2007	Eiríkur Hauksson	"Valentine Lost"	English	Failed to qualify		13	77
2008	Euroband	"This Is My Life"	English	14	64	8	68
2009	Yohanna	"Is It True?"	English	2	218	1	174
2010	Hera Björk	"Je ne sais quoi"	English, French	19	41	3	123
2011	Sjonni's Friends	"Coming Home"	English	20	61	4	100
2012	Greta Salóme and Jónsi	"Never Forget"	English	20	46	8	75
2013	Eyþór Ingi	"Ég á líf"	Icelandic	17	47	6	72
2014	Pollapönk	"No Prejudice"	English	15	58	8	61
2015	María Ólafs	"Unbroken"	English	Failed to qualify		15	14
2016	Greta Salóme	"Hear Them Calling"	English	Failed to qualify		14	51
2017	Svala	"Paper"	English	Failed to qualify		15	60
2018	Ari Ólafsson	"Our Choice"	English	Failed to qualify		19 ◁	15
2019	Hatari	"Hatrið mun sigra"	Icelandic	10	232	3	221
2020	Daði og Gagnamagnið ◇	"Think About Things" ◇	English ◇	Contest cancelled (Note: The 2020 contest was cancelled due to the COVID-19 pandemic.)			
2021	Daði og Gagnamagnið	"10 Years"	English	4	378	2	288
2022	Systur	"Með hækkandi sól"	Icelandic	23	20	10	103
2023	Diljá	"Power"	English	Failed to qualify		11	44
2024	Hera Björk	"Scared of Heights"	English	Failed to qualify		15 ◁	3
2025	Væb	"Róa"	Icelandic	25	33	6	97

== Related involvement ==
=== Conductors ===
Year	Conductor (Note: All conductors are of Icelandic nationality unless otherwise noted.)	Notes	Ref.
1986	Gunnar Þórðarson	(Note: Conducted by Þórir Baldursson at the national final.)	
1987	Hjálmar H. Ragnarsson		
1988	No conductor		
1989	No conductor		
1990	(Norway) Jon Kjell Seljeseth	(Note: Conducted by Vilhjálmur Guðjónsson in the national final.)	
1991	Jón Ólafsson		
1992	(United Kingdom) Nigel Wright	(Note: Conducted by Jón Ólafsson in the national final.)	
1993	(Norway) Jon Kjell Seljeseth		
1994	(Republic of Ireland) Frank McNamara		
1995	(Republic of Ireland) Frank McNamara		
1996	Ólafur Gaukur		
1997	(Poland) Szymon Kuran		

=== Heads of delegation ===
Year	Head of delegation	Ref.
2017–2023	Felix Bergsson	
2024	Rúnar Freyr Gíslason	
2025	Felix Bergsson	

=== Commentators and spokespersons ===
Iceland has broadcast the show since 1970. The first to be broadcast live was the 1983 edition after the plan to broadcast the 1982 contest failed. Since 1986, RÚV has broadcast the contest on the radio using same commentator for TV and radio and the Internet broadcast since early 2000s.

Commentators and spokespersons
Year	Television channel	Radio station	Commentator(s)	Spokesperson	Ref.
1970	Sjónvarpið	No radio broadcast	Unknown	Did not participate	
1971	Sjónvarpið	No radio broadcast	Björn Matthíasson	Did not participate	
1972	Sjónvarpið	No radio broadcast	Björn Matthíasson	Did not participate	
1973	Sjónvarpið	No radio broadcast	Jón O. Edwald	Did not participate	
1974	Sjónvarpið	No radio broadcast	Kristmann Eiðsson	Did not participate	
1975	Sjónvarpið	No radio broadcast	Dóra Hafsteinsdóttir	Did not participate	
1976	Sjónvarpið	No radio broadcast	Jón Skaptason	Did not participate	
1977	Sjónvarpið	No radio broadcast	Unknown	Did not participate	
1978	Sjónvarpið	No radio broadcast	Ragna Ragnars	Did not participate	
1979	Sjónvarpið	No radio broadcast	Björn Baldursson	Did not participate	
1980	Sjónvarpið	No radio broadcast	Björn Baldursson	Did not participate	
1981	Sjónvarpið	No radio broadcast	Dóra Hafsteinsdóttir	Did not participate	
1982	Sjónvarpið	No radio broadcast	Pálmi Jóhannesson	Did not participate	
1983	Sjónvarpið	No radio broadcast	Unknown	Did not participate	
1984	Sjónvarpið	No radio broadcast	No commentator	Did not participate	
1985	Sjónvarpið	No radio broadcast	Hinrik Bjarnason	Did not participate	
1986	Sjónvarpið	Rás 1	Þorgeir Ástvaldsson	Guðrún Skúladóttir	
1987	Sjónvarpið	Rás 1	Kolbrún Halldórsdóttir	Guðrún Skúladóttir	
1988	Sjónvarpið	Rás 1	Hermann Gunnarsson	Guðrún Skúladóttir	
1989	Sjónvarpið	Rás 1	Arthúr Björgvin Bollason	Erla Björk Skúladóttir	
1990	Sjónvarpið	Rás 1	Arthúr Björgvin Bollason	Unknown	
1991	Sjónvarpið	Rás 2	Arthúr Björgvin Bollason	Unknown	
1992	Sjónvarpið	Rás 2	Árni Snævarr	Unknown	
1993	Sjónvarpið	No radio broadcast	Jakob Frímann Magnússon	Unknown	
1994	Sjónvarpið	Rás 2	Jakob Frímann Magnússon	Sigríður Arnardóttir	
1995	Sjónvarpið	No radio broadcast	Jakob Frímann Magnússon	Áslaug Dóra Eyjólfsdóttir	
1996	Sjónvarpið	Rás 2	Jakob Frímann Magnússon	Svanhildur Konráðsdóttir	
1997	Sjónvarpið	Rás 2	Jakob Frímann Magnússon	Svanhildur Konráðsdóttir	
1998	Sjónvarpið	Rás 2	Páll Óskar Hjálmtýsson	Did not participate	
1999	Sjónvarpið	Rás 2	Gísli Marteinn Baldursson	Áslaug Dóra Eyjólfsdóttir	
2000	Sjónvarpið	No radio broadcast	Gísli Marteinn Baldursson	Ragnheiður Elín Clausen	
2001	Sjónvarpið	No radio broadcast	Gísli Marteinn Baldursson	Eva María Jónsdóttir	
2002	Sjónvarpið	Rás 2	Logi Bergmann Eiðsson	Did not participate	
2003	Sjónvarpið	Rás 2	Gísli Marteinn Baldursson	Eva María Jónsdóttir	
2004	Sjónvarpið (all shows)	Rás 2 (all shows)	Gísli Marteinn Baldursson	Sigrún Ósk Kristjánsdóttir	
2005	Sjónvarpið (all shows)	Rás 2 (all shows)	Gísli Marteinn Baldursson	Ragnhildur Steinunn Jónsdóttir	
2006	Sjónvarpið (all shows)	Rás 1 (semi-final); Rás 2 (final)	Sigmar Guðmundsson	Ragnhildur Steinunn Jónsdóttir	
2007	Sjónvarpið (all shows)	Rás 2 (semi-final)	Sigmar Guðmundsson	Ragnhildur Steinunn Jónsdóttir	
2008	Sjónvarpið (all shows)	Rás 2 (all shows)	Sigmar Guðmundsson	Brynja Þorgeirsdóttir	
2009	Sjónvarpið (all shows)	Rás 2 (all shows)	Sigmar Guðmundsson	Þóra Tómasdóttir	
2010	Sjónvarpið (all shows)	Rás 2 (all shows)	Sigmar Guðmundsson	Jóhanna Guðrún Jónsdóttir	
2011	RÚV (all shows)	No radio broadcast	Hrafnhildur Halldórsdóttir	Ragnhildur Steinunn Jónsdóttir	
2012	RÚV (all shows)	No radio broadcast	Hrafnhildur Halldórsdóttir	Matthías Matthíasson	
2013	RÚV (all shows)	Rás 2 (semi-final, final)	Felix Bergsson	María Sigrún Hilmarsdóttir	
2014	RÚV (all shows)	Rás 2 (all shows)	Felix Bergsson	Benedikt Valsson	
2015	RÚV (all shows)	Rás 2 (all shows)	Felix Bergsson	Sigríður Halldórsdóttir	
2016	RÚV (all shows)	Rás 2 (final)	Gísli Marteinn Baldursson	Unnsteinn Manuel Stefánsson	
2017	RÚV (all shows)	Rás 2 (semi-final, final)	Gísli Marteinn Baldursson	Björgvin Halldórsson	
2018	RÚV (all shows)	Rás 2 (semi-final, final)	Gísli Marteinn Baldursson	Edda Sif Pálsdóttir	
2019	RÚV (all shows) (Note: Icelandic commentary); RÚV 2 (all shows) (Note: English commentary for the semi-finals; Icelandic commentary with Icelandic Sign Language interpretation for the final) ruv.is (all shows) (Note: English commentary)	Unknown	Gísli Marteinn Baldursson (Icelandic); Alex Elliott (English)	Jóhannes Haukur Jóhannesson	
2020	Not announced before contest was cancelled				
2021	RÚV (all shows); RÚV 2 (all shows) (Note: English commentary for the semi-finals; Icelandic Sign Language interpretation by Elsa G. Björnsdóttir for the final) ruv.is (all shows)	Rás 2 (semi-final, final)	Gísli Marteinn Baldursson (Icelandic); Alex Elliott (English)	Hannes Óli Ágústsson (Note: As Olaf Yohansson from Eurovision Song Contest: The Story of Fire Saga)	
2022	RÚV (all shows); RÚV 2 (all shows) (Note: Icelandic Sign Language interpretation)	Rás 2 (semi-final, final)	Gísli Marteinn Baldursson	Árný Fjóla Ásmundsdóttir	
2023	RÚV (all shows); RÚV 2 (all shows)	Rás 2 (semi-final, final)	Gísli Marteinn Baldursson	Einar Stefánsson	
2024	RÚV (all shows); RÚV 2 (all shows)	Rás 2 (semi-final, final)	Guðrún Dís Emilsdóttir	Friðrik Ómar Hjörleifsson	
2025	RÚV (all shows); RÚV 2 (all shows)	Rás 2 (semi-final, final)	Guðrún Dís Emilsdóttir	Hera Björk	
2026	RÚV 2 (all shows); RÚV (semi-finals) (Note: Delayed broadcast at 19:40 UTC (21:40 CEST))	No radio broadcast	Guðrún Dís Emilsdóttir	Did not participate	

==== Other shows ====
Show	Channel	Commentator	Ref.
Songs of Europe	Sjónvarpið	Björn Baldurson	
Congratulations: 50 Years of the Eurovision Song Contest	Sjónvarpið, Rás 2	Unknown	
Eurovision Song Contest's Greatest Hits	RÚV	Unknown	
Eurovision: Europe Shine a Light	RÚV	Unknown	

== Photo gallery ==
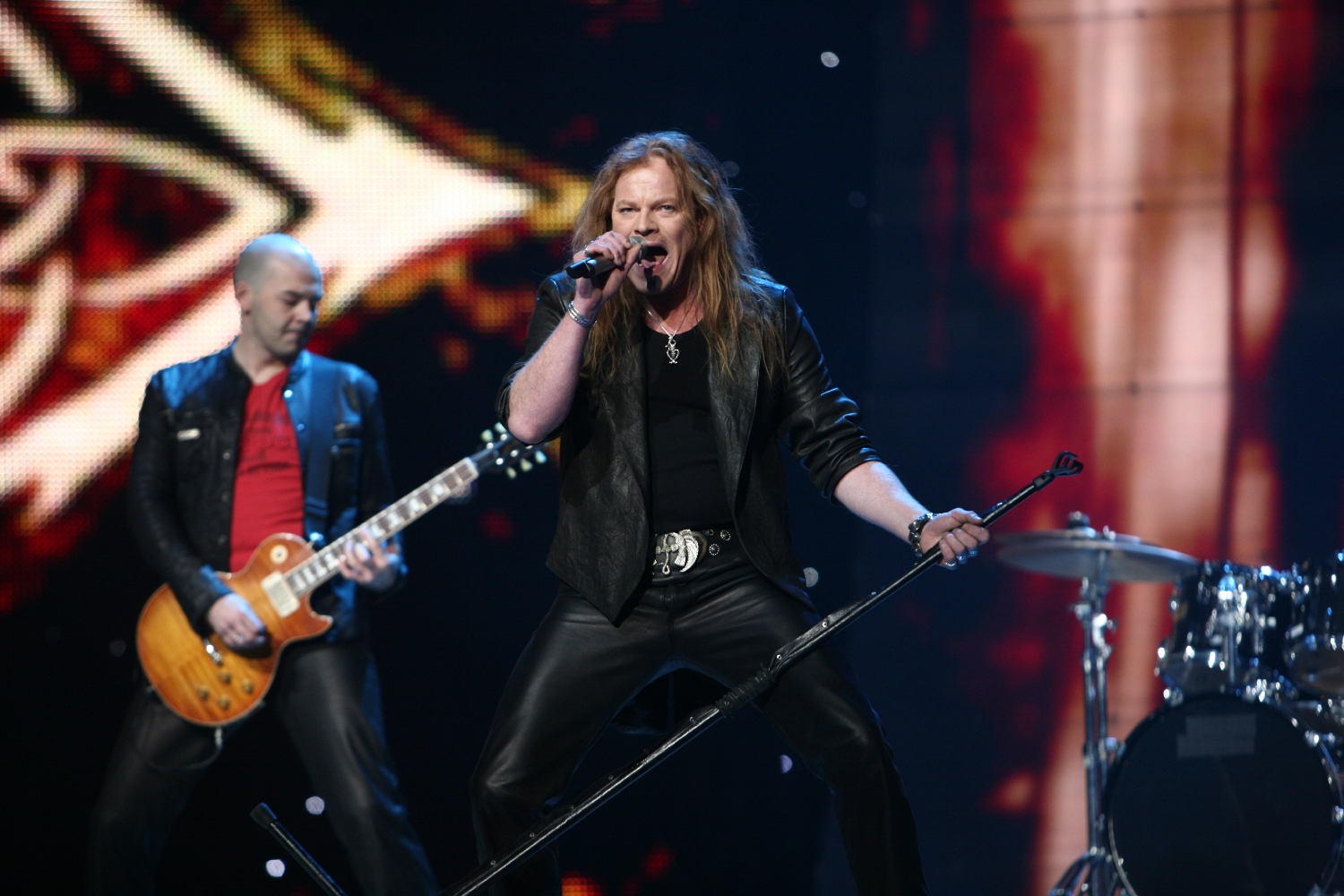
Eiríkur Hauksson in Helsinki (2007)

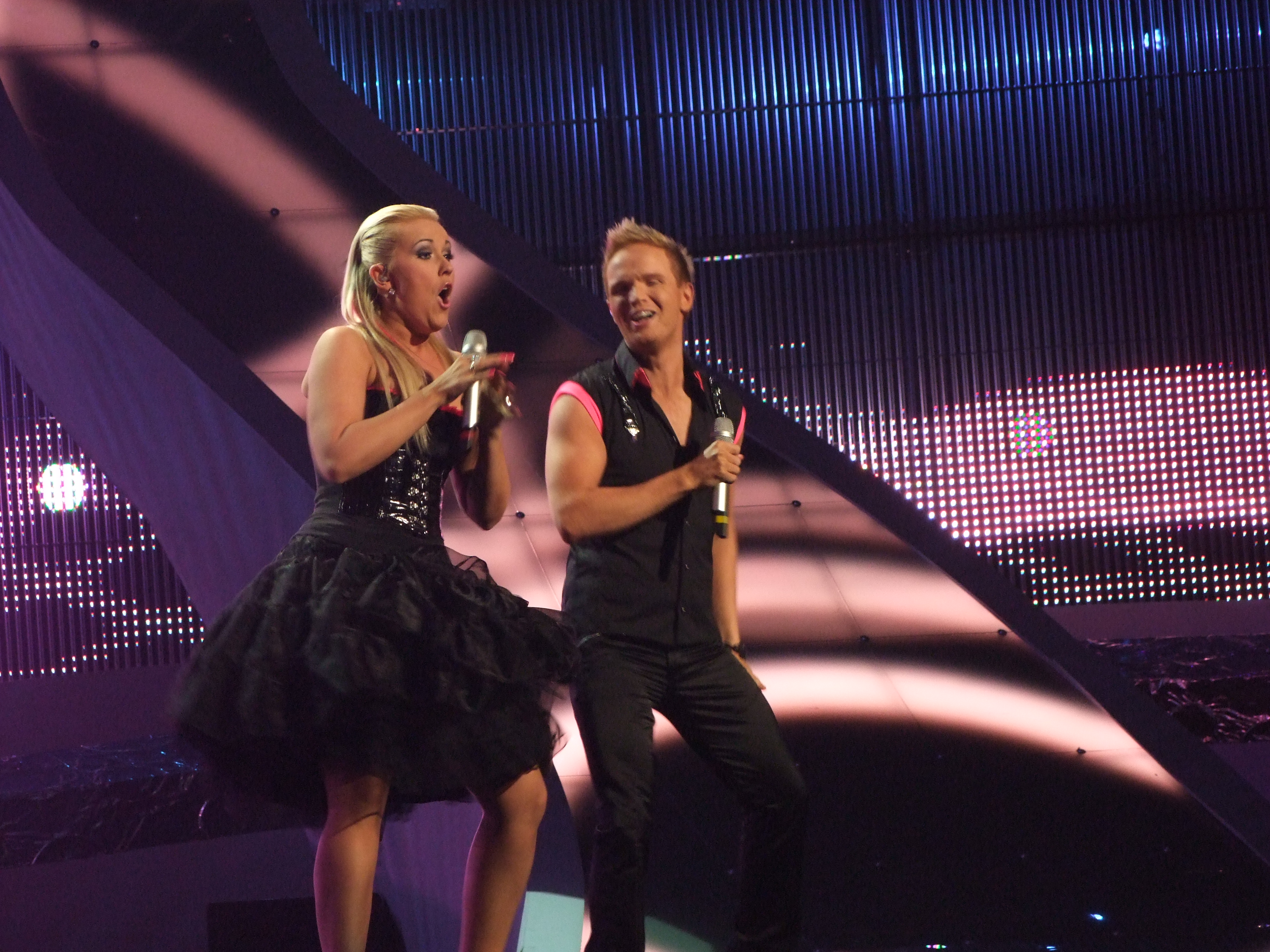
Euroband in Belgrade (2008)

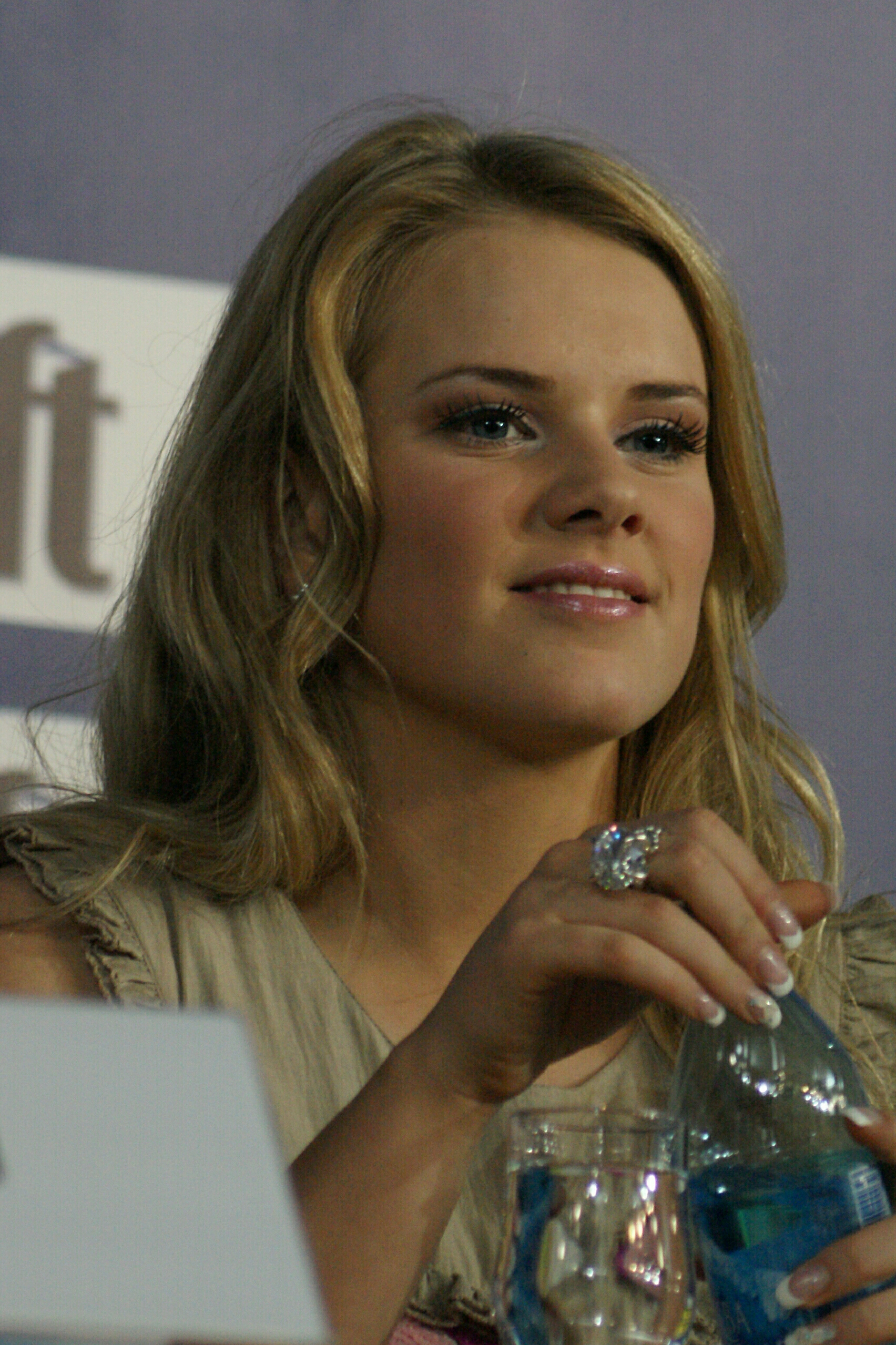
Yohanna in Moscow (2009)

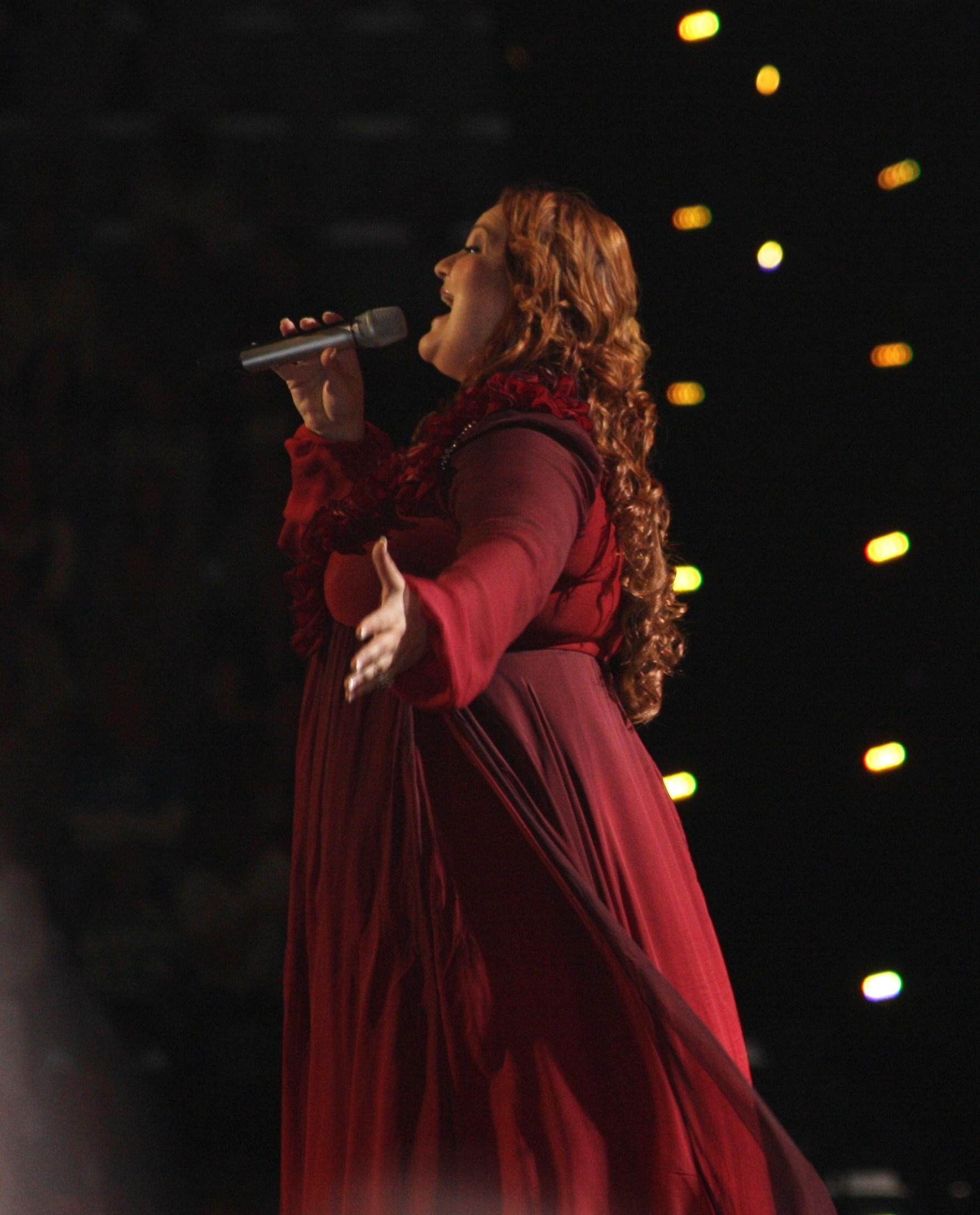
Hera Björk in Oslo (2010)

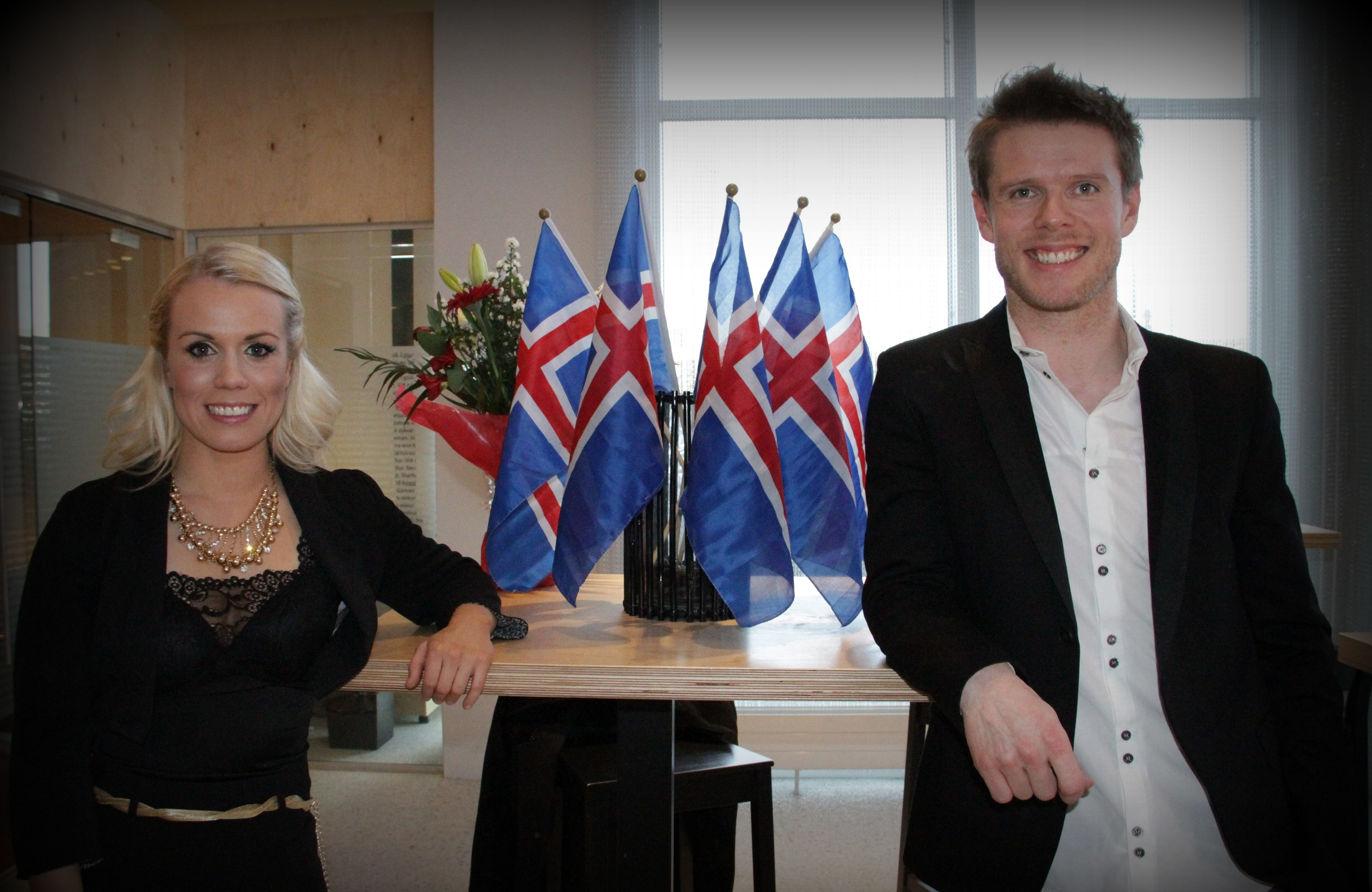
Greta Salóme and Jónsi in Baku (2012)

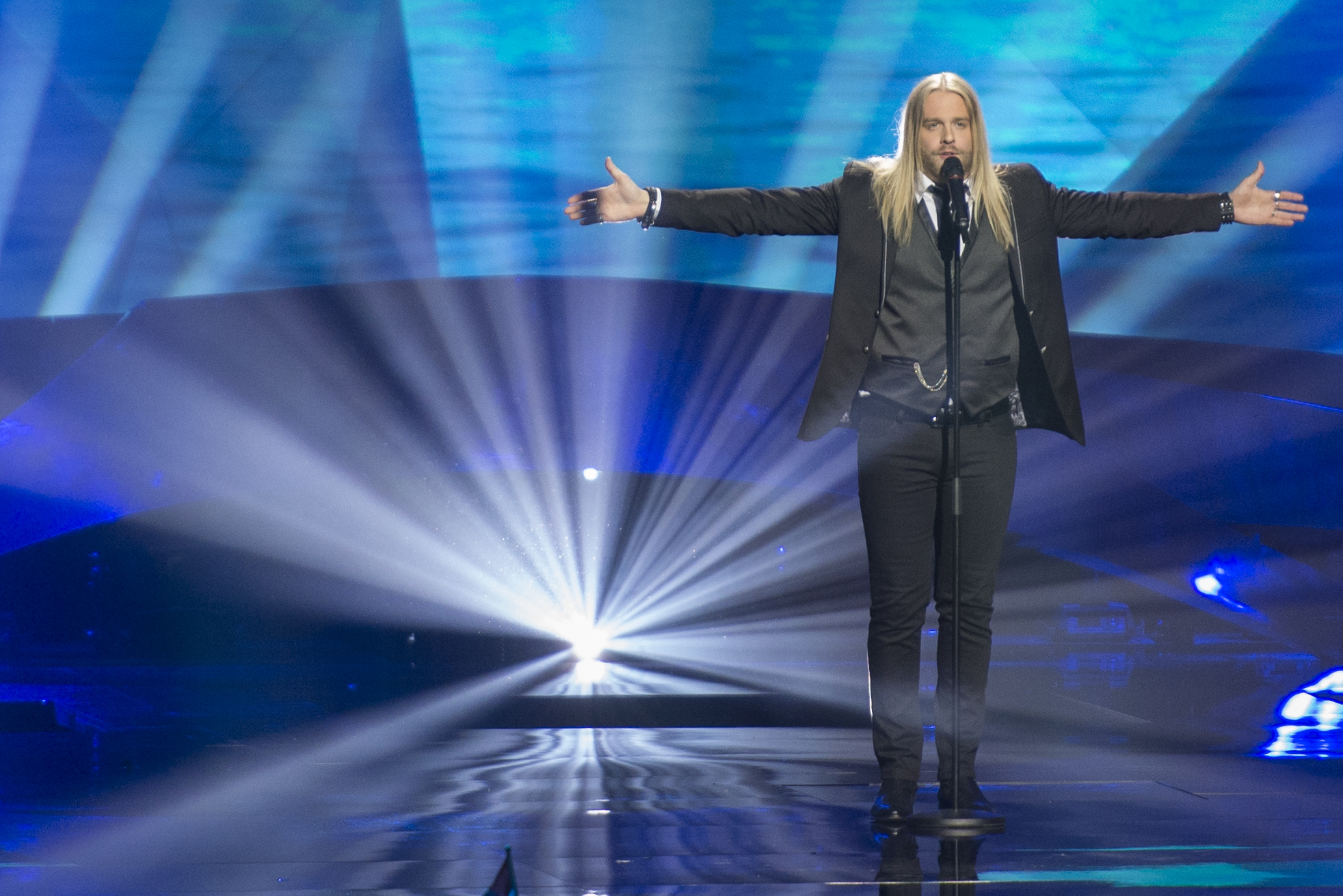
Eythor Ingi in Malmö (2013)

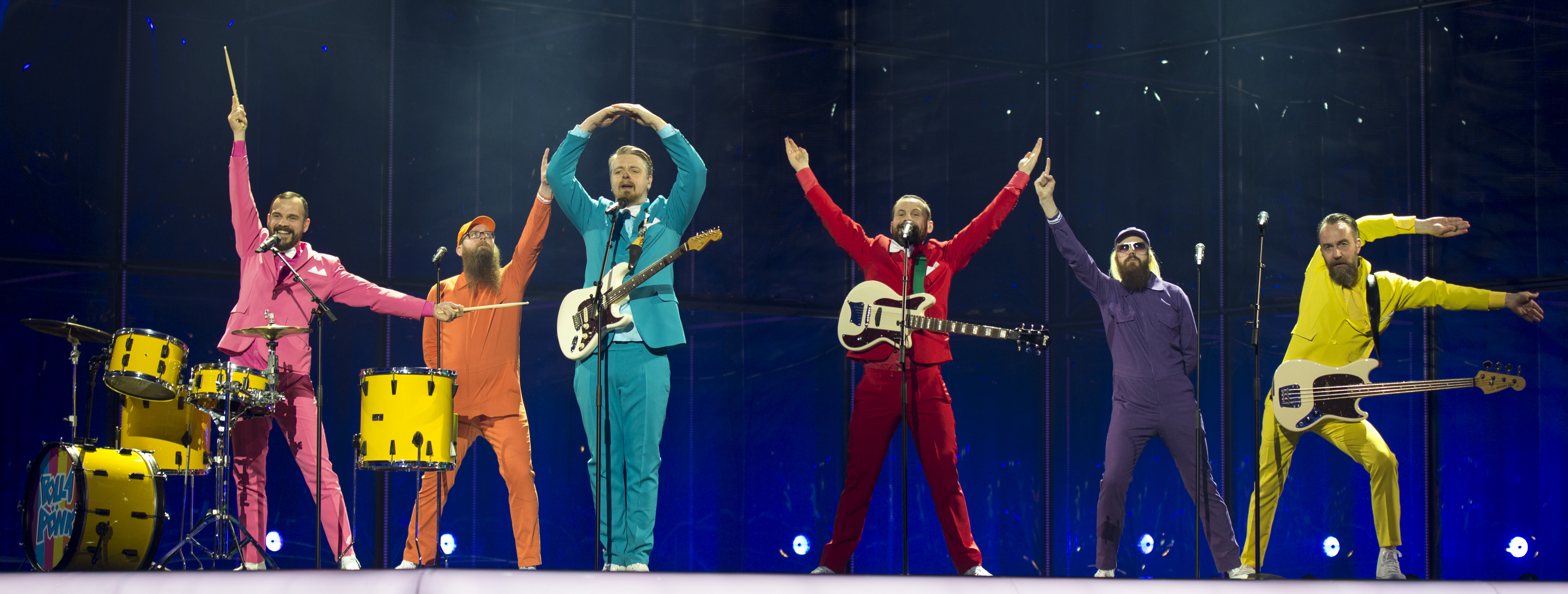
Pollapönk in Copenhagen (2014)

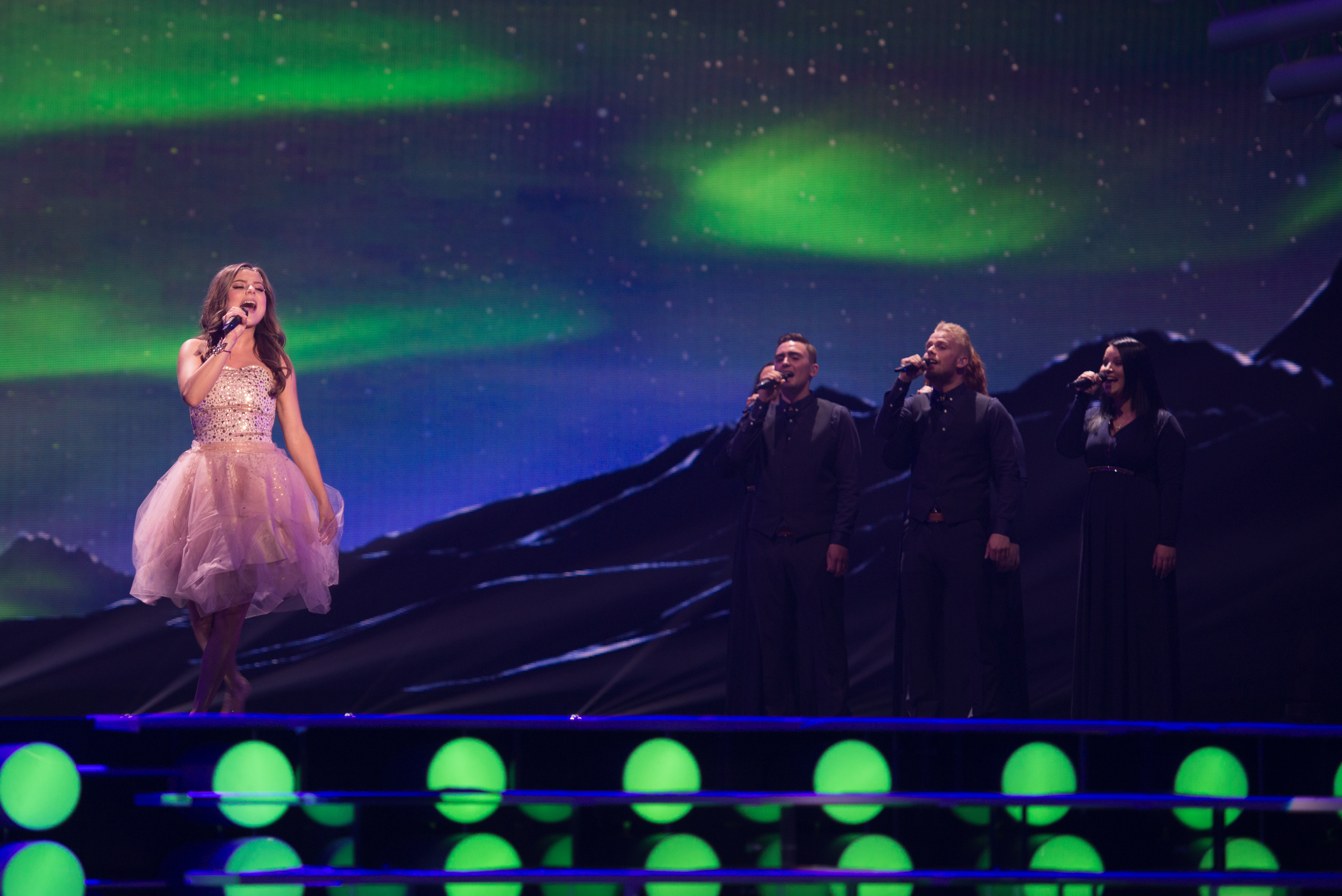
María Ólafs in Vienna (2015)

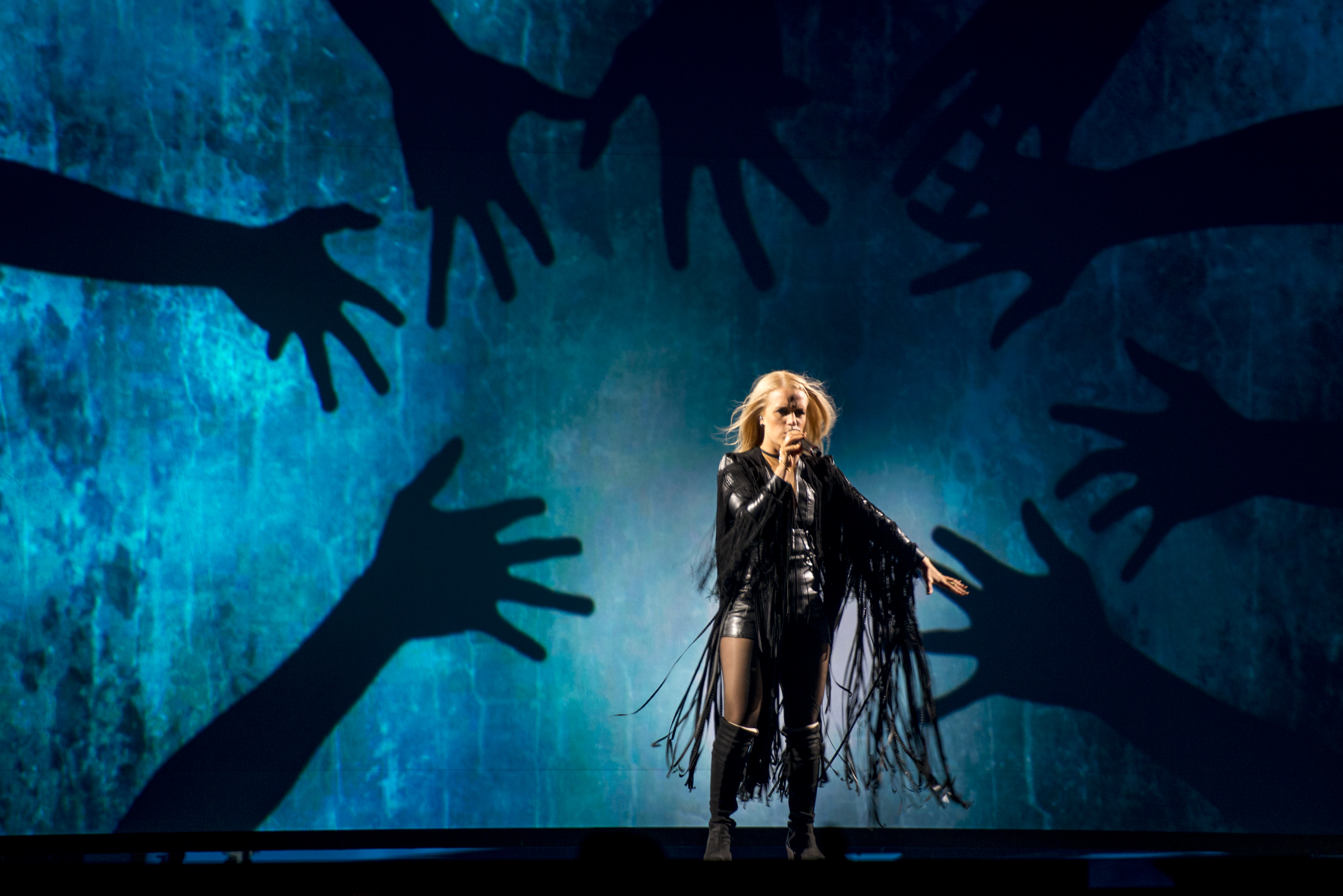
Greta Salóme in Stockholm (2016)

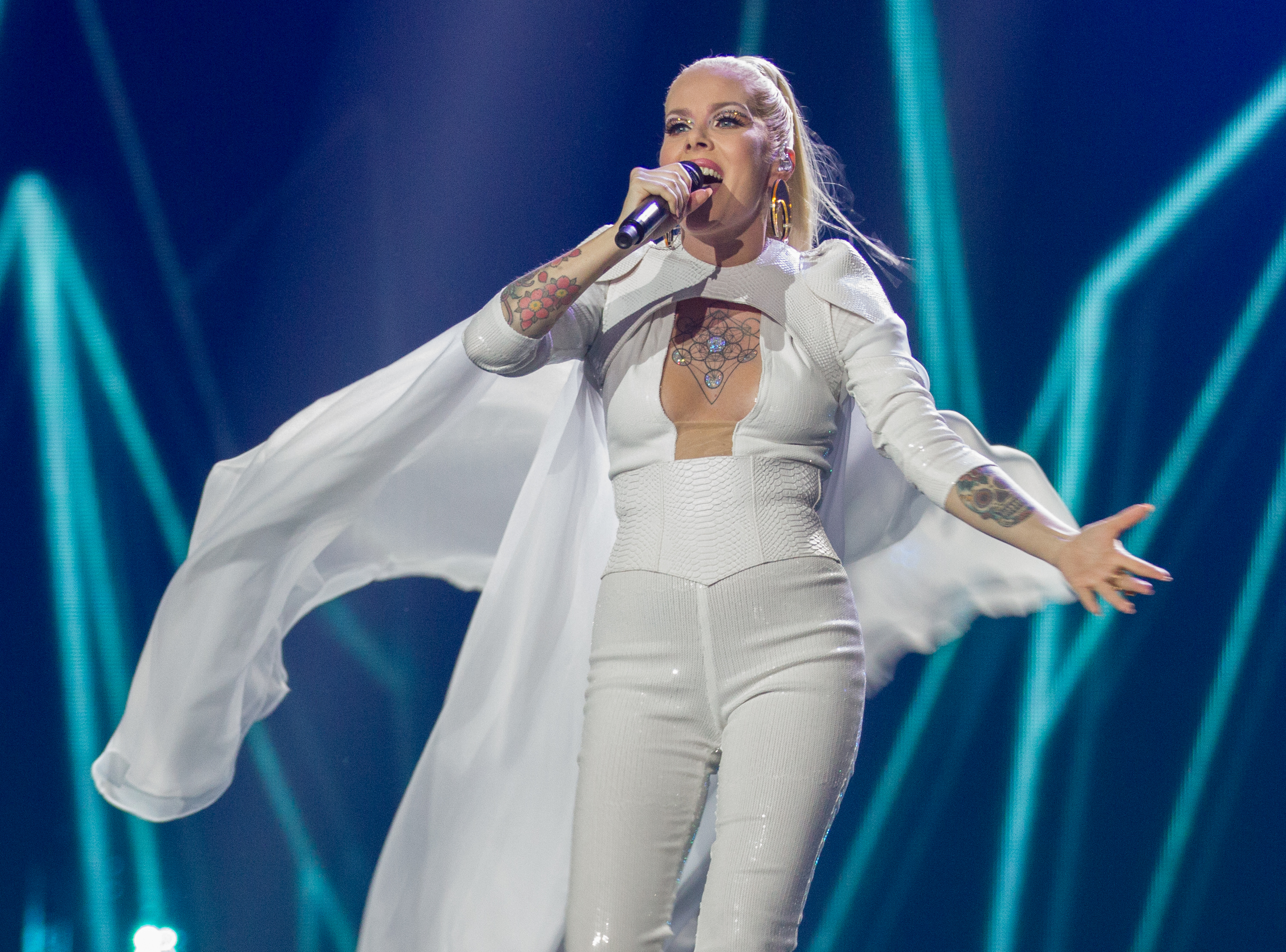
Svala in Kyiv (2017)

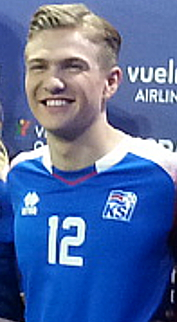
Ari Ólafsson in Lisbon (2018)

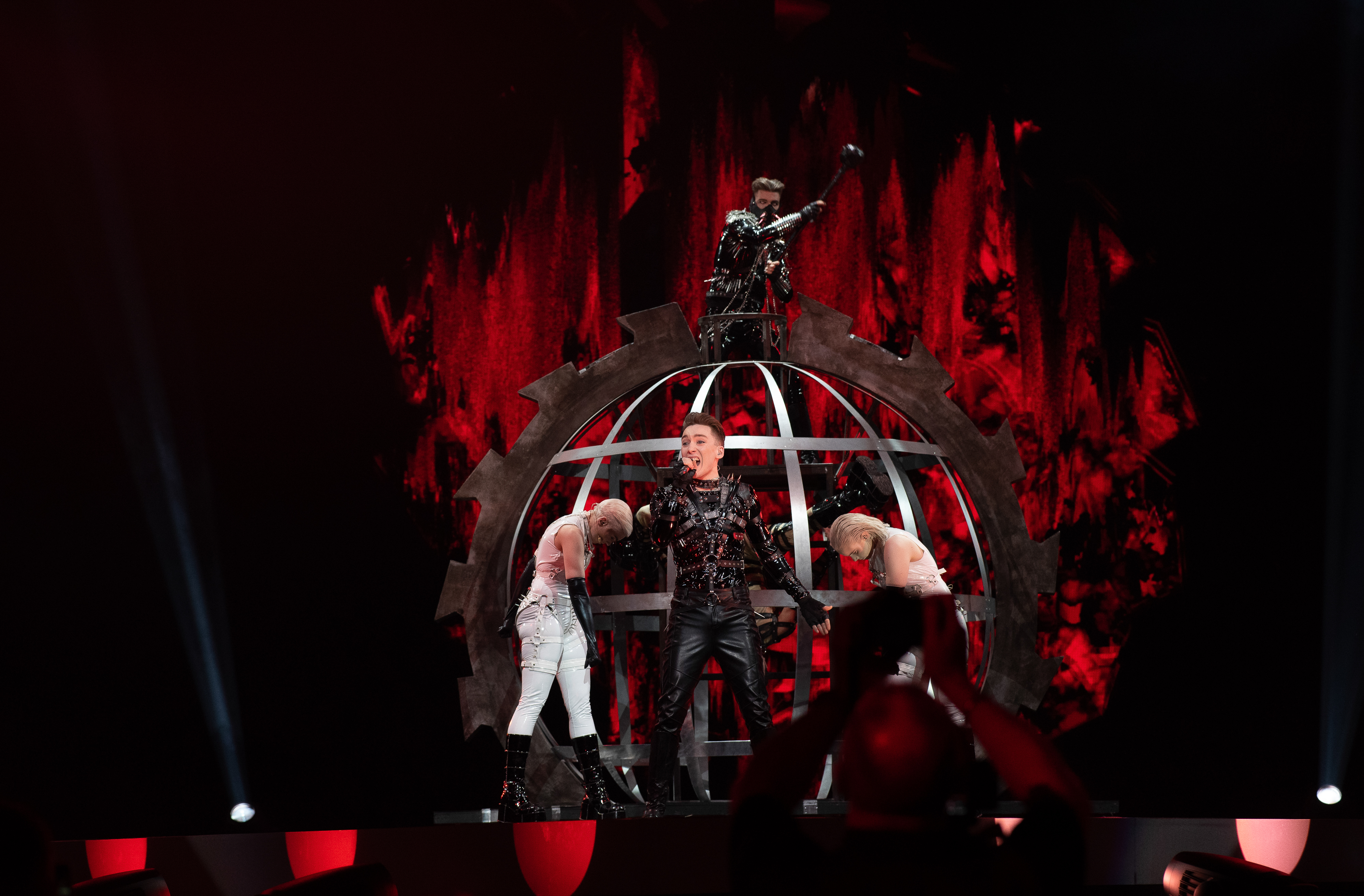
Hatari in Tel Aviv (2019)

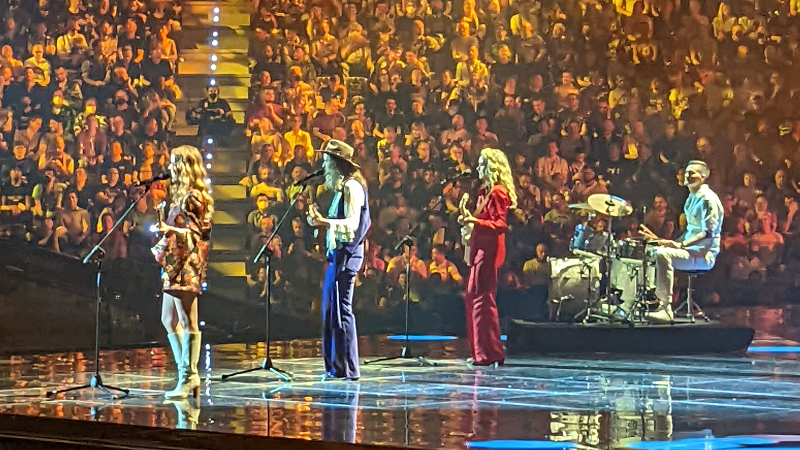
Systur in Turin (2022)

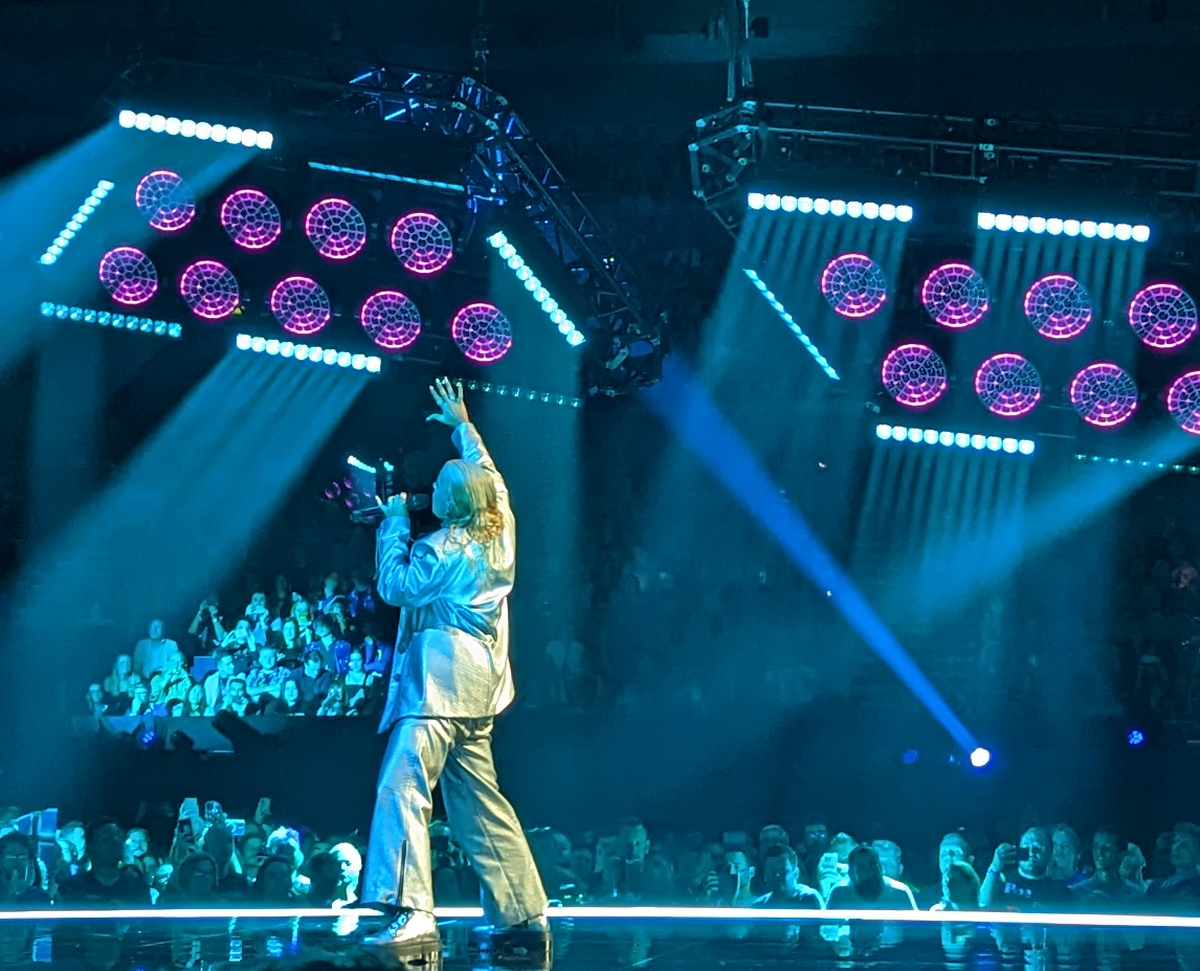
Diljá in Liverpool (2023)

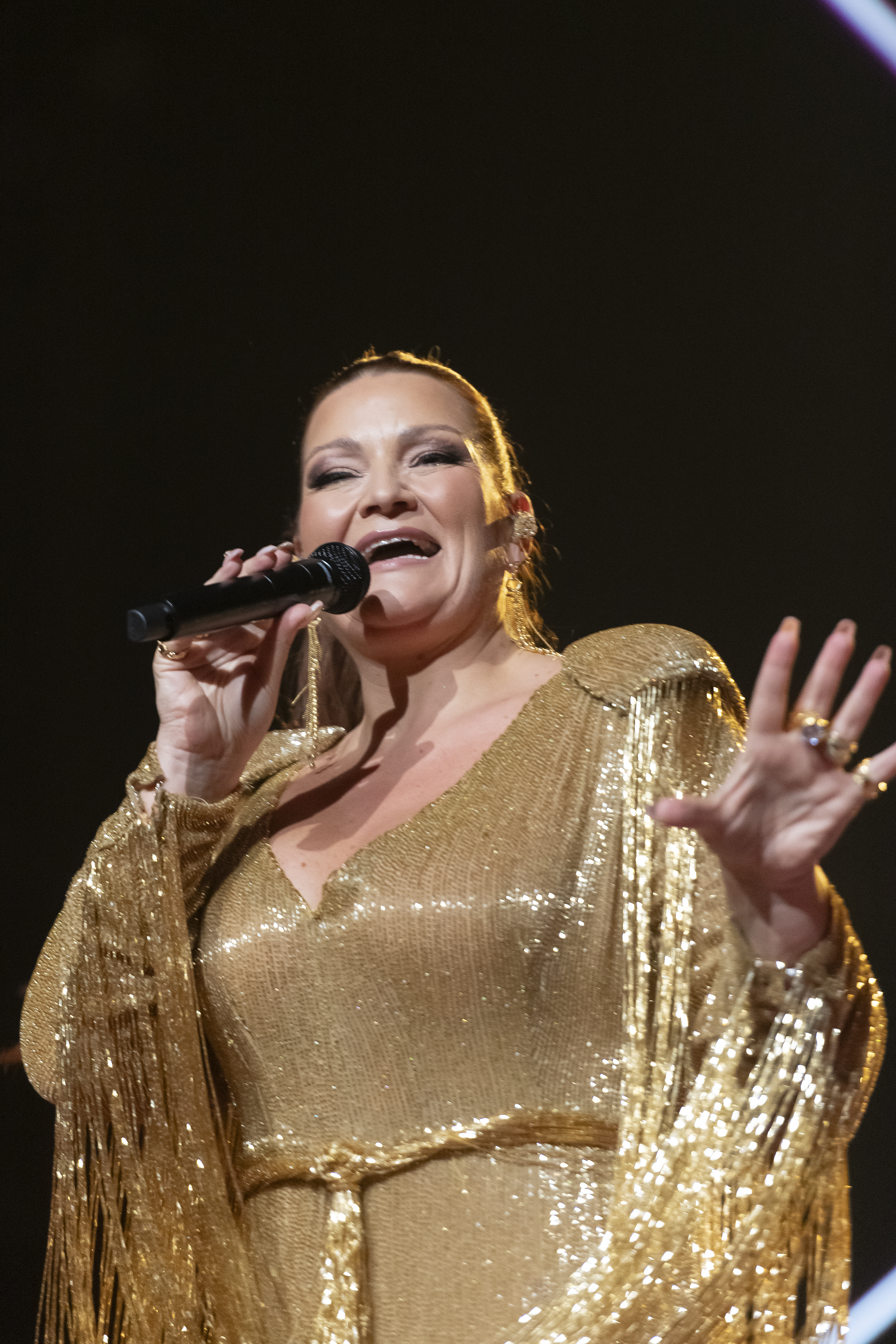
Hera Björk in Malmö (2024)

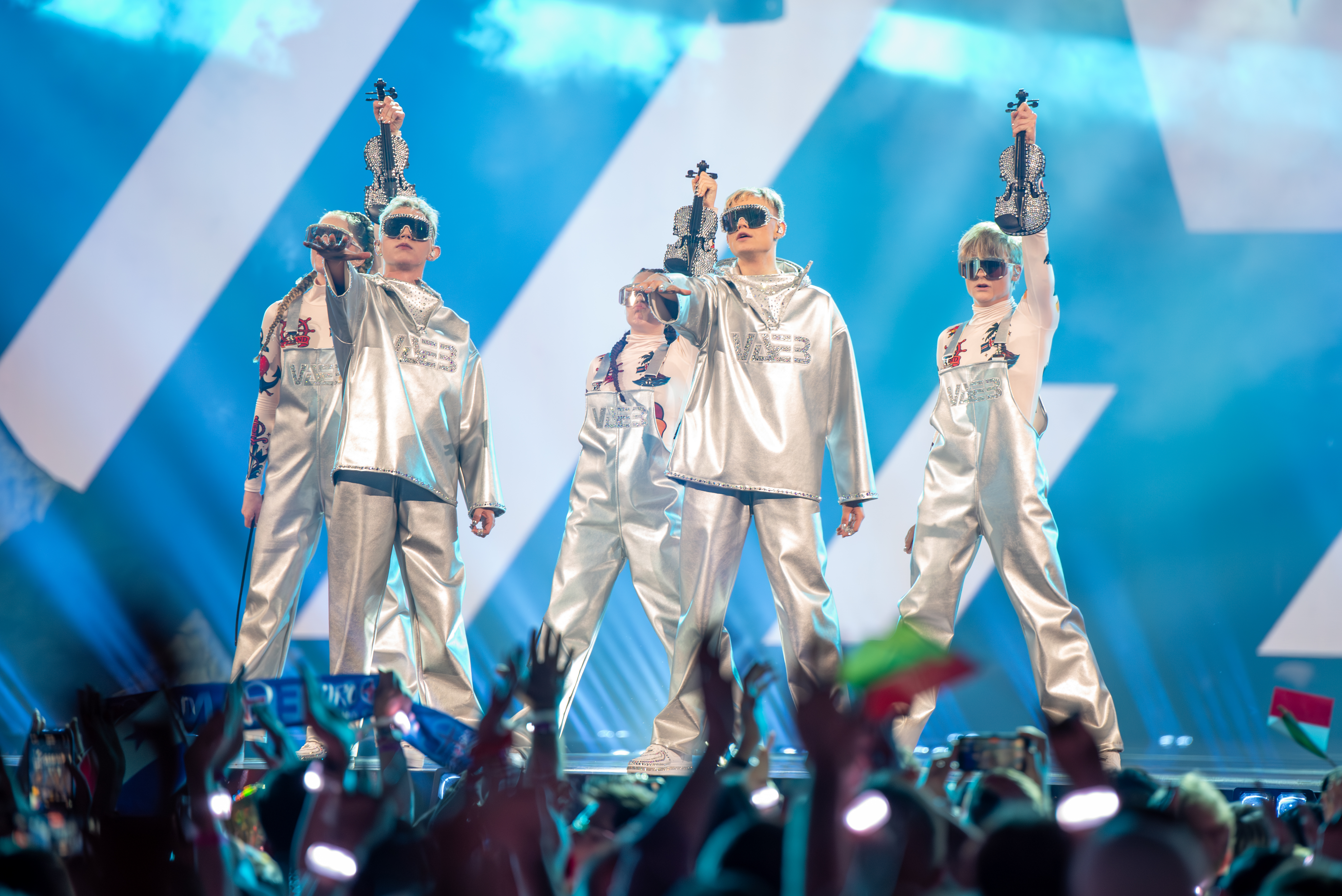
Væb in Basel (2025)

== In popular culture ==
The 2020 Netflix comedy film Eurovision Song Contest: The Story of Fire Saga stars Will Ferrell and Rachel McAdams, who portray a fictional duo from Iceland competing in Eurovision. Hannes Óli Ágústsson, who plays Olaf Yohansson in the film, reprised his role for the voting segment of the 2021 contest final, in which he presented the points on behalf of the Icelandic jury.
