= Jón Jósep Snæbjörnsson =

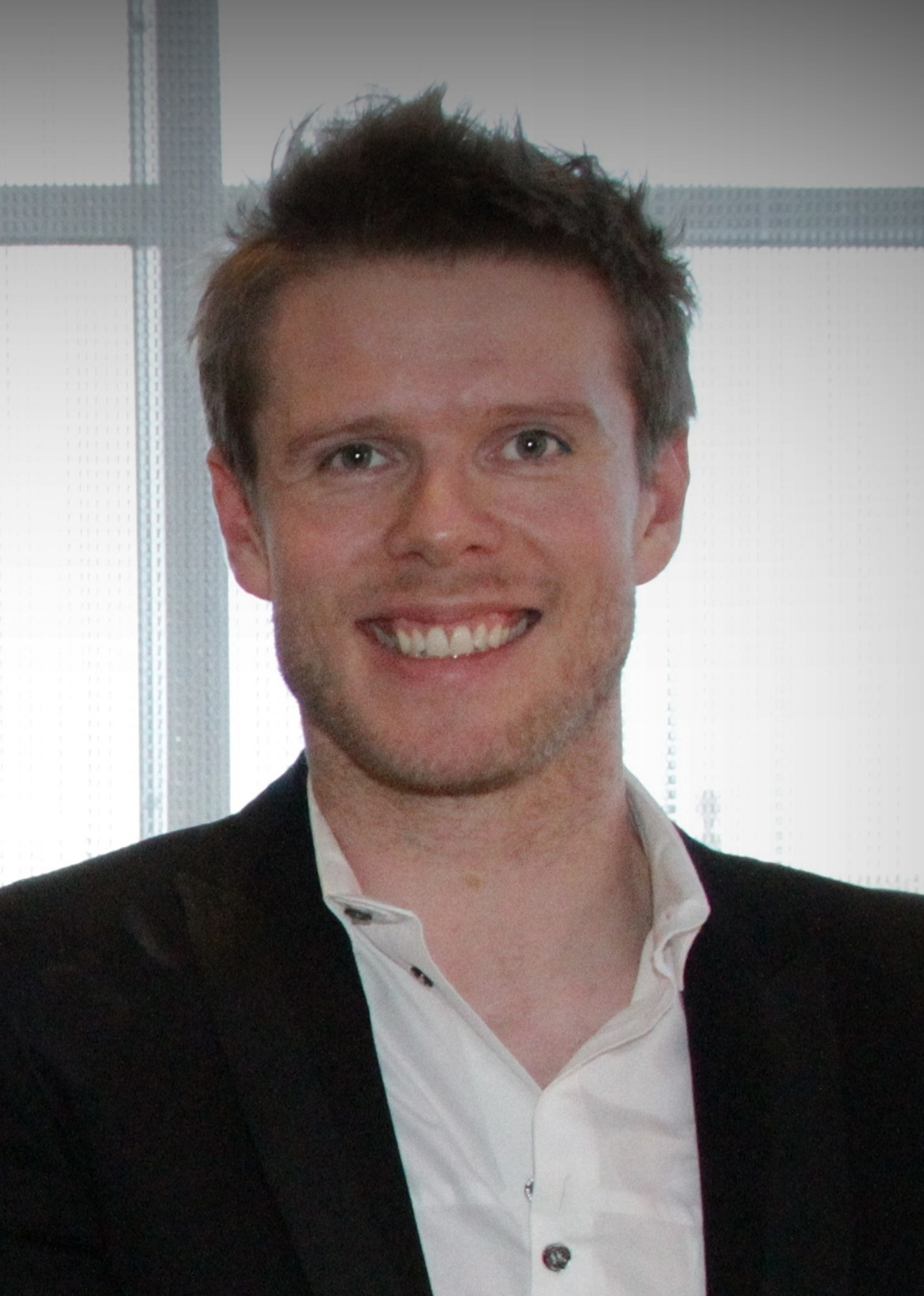

Background information
- Born: 1 June 1977 (age 48)
- Origin: Akureyri, Iceland
- Genres: Pop rock
- Years active: 1997–present
- Labels: Skifan (1995–2000), Independent

Jón Jósep Snæbjörnsson or Jónsi (born 1 June 1977) is an Icelandic singer and a former member of the band Í svörtum fötum ("In black clothing"). He represented Iceland in the Eurovision Song Contest 2004 and finished 19th. Jónsi once again represented Iceland in the Eurovision Song Contest 2012 in Baku, Azerbaijan in a duet with singer Greta Salóme, qualifying for the Eurovision final and finishing in 20th place. Jón Jósep also performed the opening theme song to the Icelandic children's television show LazyTown.

== Biography ==
Jónsi is the nickname of Jón Jósep Snæbjörnsson, one of the most popular Icelandic male singers according to 2004 public vote. He was born on 1 June 1977 in Akureyri in the northern part of Iceland. Having been singing ever since he can remember, Jónsi moved to Reykjavík in 1997 and decided to try for a career in music. He soon got several opportunities as a singer and in 1998 he joined a group of friends who had formed a band and were looking for a singer. The band was named Í Svörtum Fötum (Dressed in Black) and they debuted on 1 January 1999, dressed in black suits, white shirts, wearing black ties. After releasing the single "Nakinn" ("Naked") in spring 2001 they earned national recognition when the song reached number two on the Icelandic Chart.

The band landed a four album agreement with Skifan Records in September 2001 and started preparations for their second album. The band has been known for their active live performances and for busy tour schedules. During summer 2002 they worked on finishing their second album Í svörtum fötum, a gold selling album that got good reviews. They kept on strengthening their popularity and working on their songwriting in 2003, having even greater success with the third album Tengsl. Jónsi was nominated Vocalist of the Year at the Icelandic Music Awards 2003 for his powerful performance. He has repeatedly been awarded Male Vocalist of the Year and Best Live Performer by popular listeners' polls on radio stations.

Jónsi has also performed and recorded with many of Iceland's biggest names and in 2003 he was featured in the starring role of Danny Zuko in the musical Grease, with Birgitta playing Sandy, making Grease one of Iceland's biggest theater block busters.

== Eurovision ==
2004

In 2004, represented Iceland in the Eurovision Song Contest 2004 with a song called "Heaven", which finishing 19th in the final.

2007

Jónsi competed in Söngvakeppni Sjónvarpsins 2007 with his song "Segðu Mér" but failed to qualify for a place in Eurovision.

2012

Again, Jónsi represented Iceland in the Eurovision Song Contest 2012 in Baku, Azerbaijan in a duet with singer Greta Salóme with the song "Never Forget", finishing 8th in the first semi-final to qualify for the Eurovision final where it finished 20th.

== Discography ==
=== Albums ===
as part of Í svörtum fötum

- 2002: Í svörtum fötum

=== Singles ===
as part of Í svörtum fötum

- 2001: "Nakinn" (as part of the band Í Svörtum Fötum)

solo or collaborations

- 2004: "Heaven"
- 2007: "Segðu Mér"
- 2012: "Never Forget" (with Greta Salóme)

== Theatre ==
- Grease musical as Danny Zuko

Preceded by Birgitta Haukdal with "Open Your Heart"	Iceland in the Eurovision Song Contest; 2004	Succeeded by Selma with "If I Had Your Love"
Preceded by Sigurjón's Friends with "Coming Home"	Iceland in the Eurovision Song Contest (with Greta Salóme); 2012	Succeeded by Eythor Ingi with "Ég á líf"
