= Írafár =

Icelandic pop band

- Origin: Iceland
- Genres: Pop; Europop
- Years active: 1998–present
- Members: Birgitta Haukdal; Vignir Snær Vigfússon; Sigurður Samúelsson; Andri Guðmundsson; Arnar Gíslason; Þorbjörn Sigurðsson

Írafár (Icelandic pronunciation: ['iː.ra.faur]) is an Icelandic pop group formed in 1998 in Reykjavík. Its name means "Flurry" in Icelandic.

In the summer of 2000 Írafár released their first single, "Hvar er ég?" ("Where Am I?"). They released another two singles the following year. After signing a contract with Skífan, a major Icelandic music label, they released their first album, Allt sem ég sé ("Everything I See") in November 2002. The album was certified platinum in their native country and sold 13,000 units as of 2002.

In 2003, Írafár member Birgitta Haukdal was voted Star of the Year and Pop Artist of the Year. She was then chosen to represent Icelandic public radio and television in the Eurovision Song Contest 2003 in Riga, Latvia. She sang the song "Open your heart", originally titled "Segðu Allt mér" ("Tell Me Everything"), and finished eighth in the competition. Haukdal tried unsuccessfully to represent Iceland in Eurovision again in 2006 with the song "Mynd Af Þér" ("Picture of You").

== Members ==
Birgitta Haukdal - Vocals
Vignir Snaer Vigfusson - Guitar and Vocals
Sigurdur Runar Samúelsson - Bass
Andri Guðmundsson - Keyboard
Jóhann Ólafsson Bachmann - Drums

== Discography ==
=== Albums ===
- Allt sem ég sé ("Everything I See") (2002)
- Nýtt upphaf ("A New Beginning") (2003)
- Írafár (2005)

=== Singles ===
- "Hvar er ég?" ("Where Am I?") (2000)
- "Fingur" ("Finger") (2001)
- "Eldur í mér" ("Fire in Me") (2001)
- "Ég sjálf" ("Myself") (2002)
- "Stórir hringir" ("Large Rings") (2002)
- "Allt sem ég sé" ("Everything I See") (2002)
- "Aldrei mun ég" ("Never Will I") (2003)
- "Fáum aldrei nóg" ("We Never Get Enough") (2003)
- "Stel frá þér" ("Steal Away") (2003)
- "Lífið" ("Life") (2004)
- "Leyndarmál" ("Secret") (2005)
- "Alla tíð" ("Always") (2005)
- "Ég missi alla stjórn" ("I Lost All Control") (2005)
- "Þú vilt mig aftur" (2018)
