= Eiríkur Hauksson =

Icelandic heavy metal vocalist (born 1959)

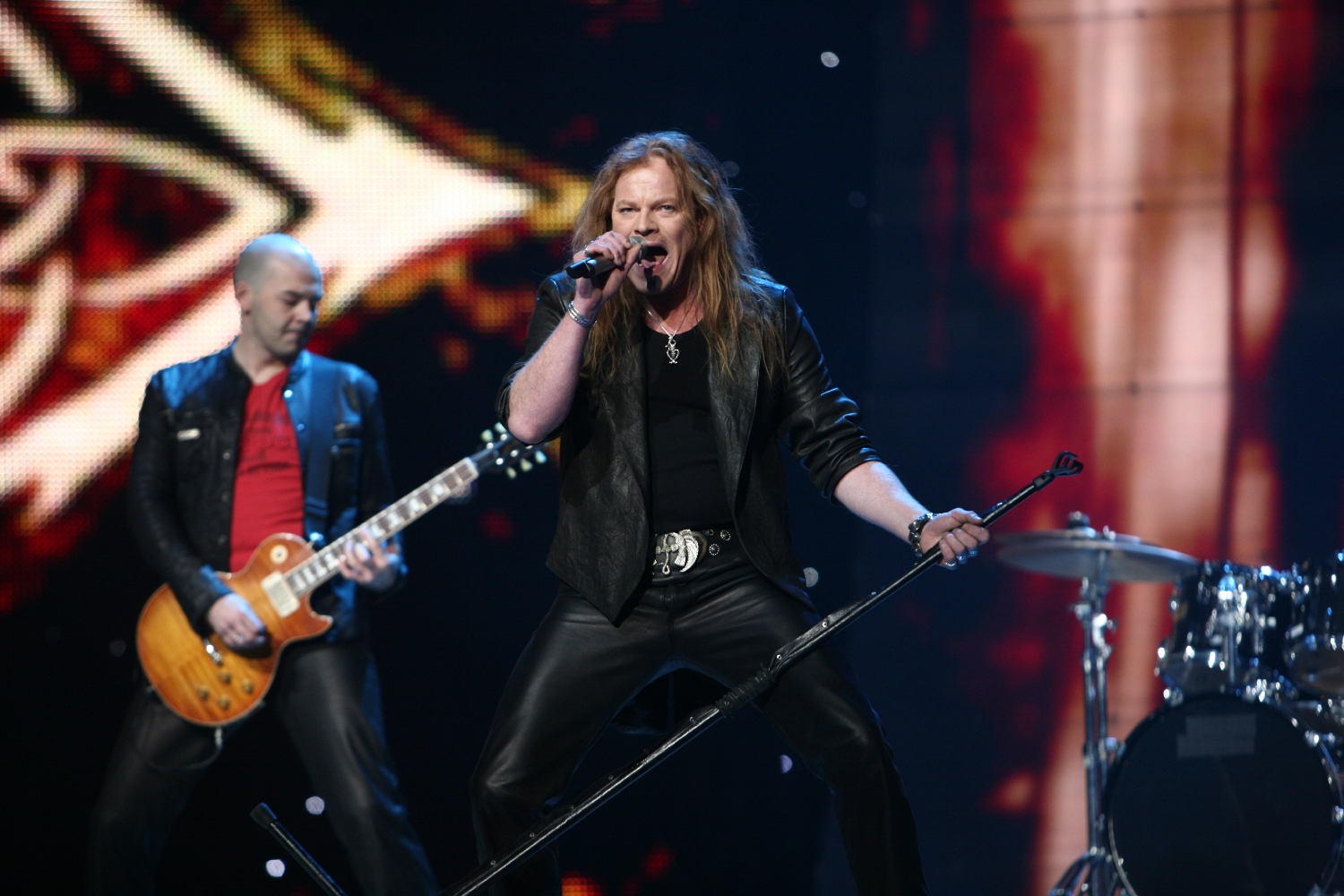
- At Eurovision in 2007

Background information
- Born: 4 July 1959 (age 67)
- Origin: Reykjavík, Iceland
- Genre: heavy metal

Eiríkur Hauksson (born 4 July 1959) is an Icelandic heavy metal vocalist. He represented Iceland at Eurovision in 1986 and in 2007.

== Career ==
Eiríkur's career as a vocalist began in earnest when the song "Sekur" he wrote and performed with the Icelandic rock group Start was voted the Icelandic song of the year in 1981. In 1984 Eiríkur's metal group Drýsill, released the album "Welcome to the show" which was released in 1000 copies.

In 1985 Eiríkur recorded two songs, "Gaggó Vest" and "Gull", written by Gunnar Þórðarson that both became popular in Iceland. Although his interest went with the heavy metal genre, he participated in the pop music scene in Iceland, participating in many group efforts in the 1980s.

In 1988 Eiríkur moved to Østfold in Norway to become the vocalist of the power metal group Artch. As their vocalist he's known as Eric Hawk. Their first album, released in 1988, Another return (to Church Hill) received much acclaim by magazines such as Kerrang (5 K's out of 5) and Metal Forces (100 out of 100). Their second album, For the sake of Mankind, was released in 1991. In 1993 Artch drifted apart. In 1999 they teamed up again for an anniversary of the Norwegian Scream Magazine, held some concerts, released a DVD titled Another Return: Live... and Beyond. Metal Blade Records remastered and re-released Artch's two albums in 2000.

Artch's bassist, Bernt Jansen, is also known as Flash, Wig Wam's bassist. Through this connection Eiríkur has performed backing vocals for Wig Wam.

Eiríkur was among Iceland's "national team" of singers who recorded Hjálpum þeim, Iceland's equivalent of Do They Know It's Christmas? and We Are the World.

In 1999 Eiríkur sang vocals on the album Soulburner by Swedish melodic death metal band Gardenian as a guest.

In 2005, Eiríkur toured Europe as the vocalist of Ken Hensley's live band called Live Fire. In late 2007, Eiríkur became the lead vocalist of Magic Pie, and in 2012, of Kerrs Pink, both Norwegian prog rock bands.

== Eurovision ==
In 1986 Iceland participated in the ESC for the first time and the Icelandic nation was taken with Eurovision fever for the first time. Eiríkur performed three songs in the finals on 15 March:

- Þetta gengur ekki lengur written by Ómar Halldórsson
- Gefðu mér gaum written by Gunnar Þórðarson and Ólafur Haukur Símonarson
- Mitt á milli Moskvu og Washington written by Ragnhildur Gísladóttir, Jakob Frímann Magnússon and Valgeir Guðjónsson

The night's winner was the song Gleðibankinn, written by Magnús Eiríksson and performed by Pálmi Gunnarsson. Since this was Iceland's first participation it was decided that a team of prominent singers would be sent with the song to Bergen. Eiríkur and Helga Möller joined Pálmi, forming the vocal trio ICY. Icelanders had high hopes for the song, and official pointers predicted good going, so it came as quite the shock when Gleðibankinn wound up in 16th place with only 19 points.

The following year Eiríkur performed the song "Lífið er lag" written by Gunnlaugur Briem and Friðrik Karlsson in the Icelandic national finals. The song wound up in second place, with Hægt og hljótt performed by Halla Margrét being sent to Brussels. As a member of the composite Icelandic group Model Eiríkur recorded Lífið er lag. The song was released on Model's eponymous album in 1987 and went on to enduring popularity in Iceland.

By the year 1991 Eiríkur had taken up residence in Norway. Norway did not hold a national final that year, but NRK rather approached four artists, Eiríkur among them, and asked them to perform at the ESC in Rome. This quartet participated under the name Just 4 Fun with the song Mrs. Thompson. They placed 17th with 14 points.

Since 2004, Eiríkur is one of a board of Eurovision specialists that presented and commented the participant songs in the ESC to the Nordic nations.

In 2007 Eiríkur performed the song "Ég les í lófa þínum" written by Sveinn Rúnar Sigurðsson and Kristján Hreinsson at the Icelandic nationals. The song won the finals with approximately 60% following by televote. Eiríkur represented Iceland in the Eurovision Song Contest in Helsinki in 2007 with the song, although it was performed in English, under the new title "Valentine Lost."

Preceded by -	Iceland in the Eurovision Song Contest; 1986 (as a member of ICY)	Succeeded by Halla Margrét with "Hægt og hljótt"
Preceded by Ketil Stokkan with "Brandenburger Tor"	Norway in the Eurovision Song Contest; 1991 (as a member of Just 4 Fun)	Succeeded by Merethe Trøan with "Visjoner"
Preceded by Silvia Night with "Congratulations"	Iceland in the Eurovision Song Contest; 2007	Succeeded by Euroband with "This Is My Life"
