= Selma Björnsdóttir =

Icelandic singer

Selma
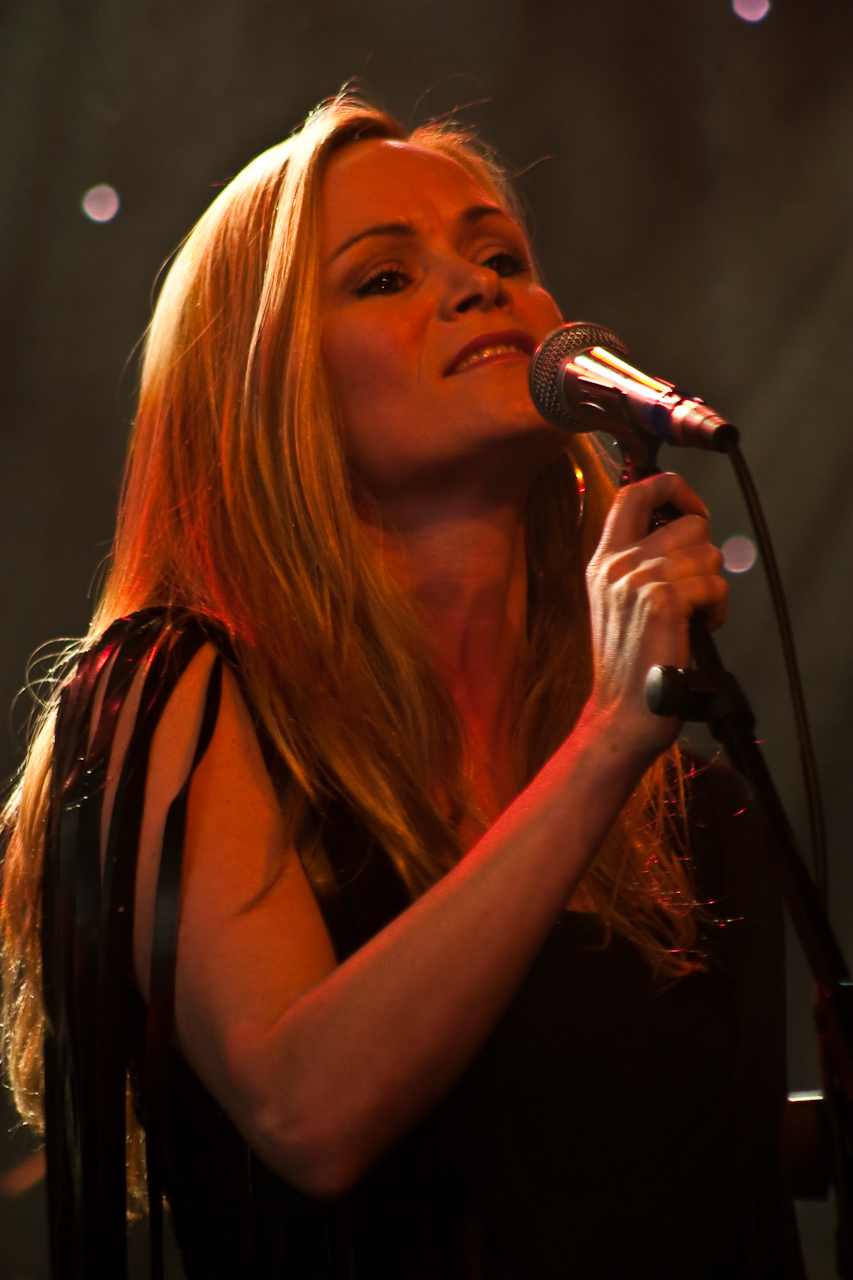
- Selma performing in 2010

Background information
- Born: Selma Björnsdóttir; 13 June 1974 (age 52); Reykjavík, Iceland
- Genres: Pop; soul
- Occupations: Singer; actress
- Instrument: Vocals
- Years active: 1996–present

Selma Björnsdóttir (born 13 June 1974), also known as Selma or Selma Björns, is an Icelandic actress and singer born in Reykjavík. She is well-known internationally for representing Iceland in the Eurovision Song Contest in both 1999 and 2005.

== Career ==
=== Áfram Latibær ===
In 1996, Selma played Solla Stirða in the Icelandic stage play Áfram Latibær!. This character later developed into Stephanie on the children's television show LazyTown. She would later choreograph episodes of LazyTown.

=== Eurovision ===
Her first Eurovision experience occurred in the 1999 contest in Jerusalem, with the song "All Out of Luck". The song was the pre-contest favorite with bookmakers. During the voting, Selma shot into an early lead in the voting but was gradually pegged back by Sweden, represented by Charlotte Nilsson. Despite trailing Nilsson only very narrowly before the penultimate set of votes were announced, Selma's hopes of victory came to an abrupt end when Bosnia and Herzegovina awarded maximum points to Sweden and nothing at all to Iceland. Selma's second place in Jerusalem is Iceland's equal-best showing in the contest, with Yohanna also placing second in the contest in 2009.

In 2005, Selma was again selected to represent Iceland in the Eurovision Song Contest in Kyiv. However, despite being one of the favorites to win the contest, her song "If I Had Your Love" did not make it to the final, finishing 16th out of 25 in the semi-final. This was Iceland's worst placement at the song contest until 2018. For a time, Selma held Iceland's best and worst results at the contest.

Selma also was one of the main attractions at the Eurovision Gala concert during Europride 2005 in Oslo, performing both of her Eurovision entries. Other celebrities who were present included Baccara, Nanne, Bobbysocks and Nora Brockstedt. Later the same night, she held an intimate concert at the popular nearby nightclub Smuget, where another Icelandic Eurovision participant, Páll Óskar, and the Norwegian Eurovision commentator, Jostein Pedersen, showed up.

=== Other work ===
Selma has dubbed several Disney princesses for the Icelandic Language, including Belle, Tiana, Kayley, Tzipporah, Odette, Giselle, and Megara. In 2009, Selma became a jury member on Idol Stjörnuleit, the Icelandic version of Pop Idol. Selma was the stage director for Iceland in the 2025 Eurovision Song Contest.

== See also ==
- Iceland in the Eurovision Song Contest
- Europride

Preceded by Paul Oscar with "Minn hinsti dans"	Iceland in the Eurovision Song Contest; 1999	Succeeded by August & Telma with "Tell Me!"
Preceded by Jónsi with "Heaven"	Iceland in the Eurovision Song Contest; 2005	Succeeded by Silvia Night with "Congratulations"
