= Iceland in the Eurovision Song Contest 2004 =

- Eurovision Song Contest 2004
- Participating broadcaster: Ríkisútvarpið (RÚV)
- Country: Iceland
- Selection process: Internal selection
- Announcement date: Artist: 9 February 2004; Song: 20 March 2004

Competing entry
- Song: "Heaven"
- Artist: Jónsi
- Songwriters: Sveinn Rúnar Sigurðsson; Magnús Þór Sigmundsson

Placement
- Final result: 19th, 16 points

Participation chronology

Iceland was represented at the Eurovision Song Contest 2004 with the song "Heaven", composed by Sveinn Rúnar Sigurðsson, with lyrics by Magnús Þór Sigmundsson, and performed by Jónsi. The Icelandic participating broadcaster, Ríkisútvarpið (RÚV), internally selected its entry for the contest. Jónsi was announced on 9 February 2004, while the song "Heaven" was presented to the public on 20 March 2004 during the television programme Laugardagskvöld með Gísla Marteini.

As one of ten highest placed finishers in the 2003 contest Iceland directly qualified to compete in the final of the Eurovision Song Contest which took place on 15 May 2004. Performing in position 17, Iceland placed nineteenth out of the 24 participating countries with 16 points.

== Background ==
Prior to the 2004 Contest, Ríkisútvarpið (RÚV) had participated in the Eurovision Song Contest representing Iceland sixteen times since its first entry in 1986. Its best placing in the contest to this point was second, achieved in 1999 with the song "All Out of Luck" performed by Selma. In 2003, "Open Your Heart" performed by Birgitta Haukdal placed eighth.

As part of its duties as participating broadcaster, RÚV organises the selection of its entry in the Eurovision Song Contest and broadcasts the event in the country. The broadcaster confirmed its intentions to participate at the 2004 contest on 2 October 2003. Between 2000 and 2003, RÚV has used a national final to select its entry for the contest. For 2004, the broadcaster opted to internally select its entry for the first time since 1999 due to financial reasons.

== Before Eurovision ==
=== Internal selection ===
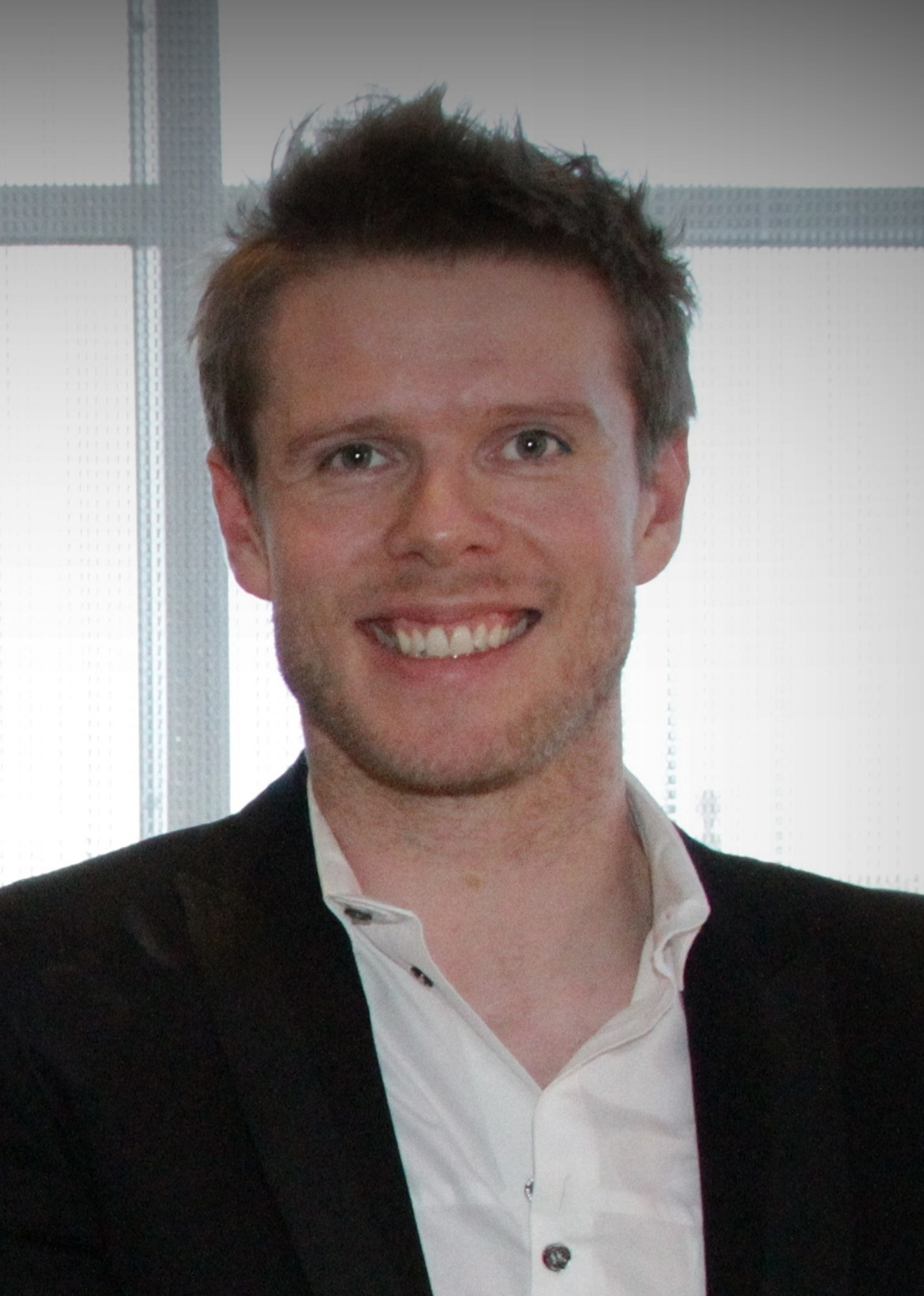
Jónsi was internally selected to represent Iceland in 2004

On 19 October 2003, RÚV announced that it would select its entry for the Eurovision Song Contest 2004 internally. The broadcaster also opened the submission period for interested songwriters to submit their entries until the deadline on 17 November 2003. At the close of the submission deadline, 117 entries were received. On 9 February 2004, "Heaven" performed by Jónsi was announced by RÚV as the Icelandic entry. The song was composed by Sveinn Rúnar Sigurðsson with lyrics by Magnús Þór Sigmundsson. Prior to the announcement of Jónsi as its representative, the broadcaster had denied reports that Emilana Torrini would represent Iceland with the song "Morning Light", composed by Selma Björnsdóttir (who represented Iceland in 1999). "Heaven" was presented to the public along with the release of the official music video on 20 March 2004 during the television programme Laugardagskvöld með Gísla Marteini.

== At Eurovision ==
It was announced that the competition's format would be expanded to include a semi-final in 2004. According to the rules, all nations with the exceptions of the host country, the "Big Four" (France, Germany, Spain, and the United Kingdom) and the ten highest placed finishers in the 2003 contest are required to qualify from the semi-final in order to compete for the final; the top ten countries from the semi-final progress to the final. As Iceland finished eighth in the 2003 contest, the nation automatically qualified to compete in the final on 15 May 2004. On 23 March 2004, a special allocation draw was held which determined the running order and Iceland was set to perform in position 17 in the final, following the entry from Greece and before the entry from Ireland. Iceland placed nineteenth in the final, scoring 16 points.

The semi-final and the final were broadcast in Iceland on RÚV with commentary by Gísli Marteinn Baldursson. RÚV appointed Sigrún Ósk Kristjánsdóttir as its spokesperson to announce the Icelandic votes during the final.

=== Voting ===
Below is a breakdown of points awarded to Iceland and awarded by Iceland in the semi-final and grand final of the contest. The nation awarded its 12 points to Denmark in the semi-final and to Ukraine in the final of the contest.

Following the release of the televoting figures by the EBU after the conclusion of the competition, it was revealed that a total of 65,671 televotes were cast in Iceland during the two shows: 19,361 votes during the semi-final and 46,310 votes during the final.

==== Points awarded to Iceland ====
Points awarded to Iceland (Final)
| Score | Country |
|---|---|
| 12 points | |
| 10 points | |
| 8 points | |
| 7 points | |
| 6 points | |
| 5 points | Monaco; Norway |
| 4 points | |
| 3 points | |
| 2 points | Denmark; Finland; Russia |
| 1 point | |

==== Points awarded by Iceland ====
Points awarded by Iceland (Semi-final)
| Score | Country |
|---|---|
| 12 points | Denmark |
| 10 points | Ukraine |
| 8 points | Cyprus |
| 7 points | Estonia |
| 6 points | Greece |
| 5 points | Netherlands |
| 4 points | Albania |
| 3 points | Finland |
| 2 points | Malta |
| 1 point | Belarus |

Points awarded by Iceland (Final)
| Score | Country |
|---|---|
| 12 points | Ukraine |
| 10 points | Cyprus |
| 8 points | Sweden |
| 7 points | Serbia and Montenegro |
| 6 points | Greece |
| 5 points | Turkey |
| 4 points | Albania |
| 3 points | Poland |
| 2 points | United Kingdom |
| 1 point | Spain |
