= Tobi Jooste =

- Born: Karoo, South Africa
- Genres: Pop, Classical music
- Instruments: Vocals, piano
- Years active: 2007–present
- Labels: Leo Musiek, Storm Rekordz
- Website: www.tobijooste.co.za

Tobi Jooste is a South African singer, model, writer and television personality from Karoo, South Africa but now based in Johannesburg. Known for his baritone voice, he sings in Afrikaans, English and Italian. Signed earlier with Leo Musiek, he has now signed with Storm Rekordz label.

== Music ==
He started a musical career in 2007, having to choose between an international modeling career in Paris and his singing career. He has released so far four studio albums. He has also recorded a great number of covers for Eurovision Song Contest in their original languages or in Afrikaans.

== Television ==
He has had a prosperous television career hosting Reik na die sterre (meaning Reaching for the stars) kykNET television as well as hosting various shows on South African stations ASTV with "Paparazzi" and at TopTV.

== Modelling and fashion ==
He was offered an international modelling career in Paris but decided to pursue his music career. But meanwhile he has established his own fashion line "Royal Active Tags" and releases a Gym series for men. He is the face of Maria Garcia MEN International, and has his own perfume range for men and women. He is ambassador for ACVV and has done a nationwide tour with their clothes to raise funds for charity.

== Other ==
Also a writer, he has written two books: Inluister (meaning eavesdrop) which is in its 3rd reprint and Daar is 'n Eiffeltoring in sy Boedel, also a best-seller in the non-fiction category in South Africa. A connoiseur of coffee and wine, he has a regular wine tasting column for an internet wine magazine. He is also a keen designer designing all his records and publications.

== Books authored ==
- Inluister
- Daar is 'n Eiffeltoring in sy Boedel

== Discography ==
- Sprei Jou Vlerke (double album)
- Onthou Jy (double album with the bonus Crooners)
- Amoré

Others

- Die Beste Sover
- Hartkamers
