= Sweden in the Eurovision Song Contest 2004 =

- Eurovision Song Contest 2004
- Participating broadcaster: Sveriges Television (SVT)
- Country: Sweden
- Selection process: Melodifestivalen 2004
- Selection date: 20 March 2004

Competing entry
- Song: "It Hurts"
- Artist: Lena Philipsson
- Songwriters: Thomas "Orup" Eriksson

Placement
- Final result: 5th, 170 points

Participation chronology

Sweden was represented at the Eurovision Song Contest 2004 with the song "It Hurts", written by Thomas "Orup" Eriksson, and performed by Lena Philipsson. The Swedish participating broadcaster, Sveriges Television (SVT), selected its entry through Melodifestivalen 2004.

== Before Eurovision ==
=== Melodifestivalen 2004 ===
Melodifestivalen 2004 was hosted by Charlotte Perrelli (winner of the Eurovision Song Contest 1999), Ola Lindholm and Peter Settman. 32 songs were divided into 4 heats in order to find 10 finalists for the final. As usual, 2 songs from each heat directly qualified for the final, and all 3rd and 4th places went to the Wildcard round, where 2 more songs would make it to the final. The winner was chosen by regional juries (50%) and televoting (50%) of which Lena Philipsson was the favourite with both. The song is written and composed by Thomas 'Orup' Eriksson.

==== Heats and Second Chance round ====
- The first heat took place on 21 February 2004. "Tango! Tango!" performed by Petra Nielsen and "Som stormen" performed by Sara Löfgren qualified directly to the final, while "Love Turns Water Into Wine" performed by Karl Martindahl and "Älvorna" performed by Sarek advanced to the Second Chance round. "En gång för alla" performed by Nina and Kim, "Still Believe" performed by Joachim Bergström, "It's in the Stars" performed by LaGaylia Frazier and "Tro på mig" performed by Niklas Andersson were eliminated from the contest.
- The second heat took place on 28 February 2004. "Paradise" performed by E-Type feat. Nana and "Vindarna vänder oss" performed by Fame qualified directly to the final, while "Finally" performed by Fredrik Kempe and "Säg att du har ångrat dig" performed by Anne-Lie Rydé advanced to the Second Chance round. "Soy tu Venus" performed by Baccara, "You Are the Sunshine of My Life" performed by Jennifer Escola, "Trendy Discoteque" performed by Pay TV and "(Are U) Ready or Not" performed by LaRoxx were eliminated from the contest.
- The third heat took place on 6 March 2004. "Här stannar jag kvar" performed by Sandra Dahlberg and "C'est la vie" performed by Hanson, Carson and Malmkvist qualified directly to the final, while "Efharisto" performed by Bosson and "Blow the Spot" performed by Bubbles advanced to the Second Chance round. "Innan mörkret faller" performed by Emil Sigfridsson, "Baby I Can't Stop" performed by Gladys del Pilar, "Super Mega Nova" performed by Itchycoo and "Bulletproof Heart" performed by Autolove were eliminated from the contest.
- The fourth heat took place on 13 March 2004. "Det gör ont" performed by Lena Philipsson and "La dolce vita" performed by After Dark qualified directly to the final, while "Olé Olé" performed by Andrés Esteche and "Min kärlek" performed by Shirley Clamp advanced to the Second Chance round. "Just Like Me" performed by Anders Borgius, "Boom Bang-a-Bang" performed by Glenn Borgkvist and Lotta Nilsson, "Runaway" performed by Pandora and "Äntligen" performed by Fre were eliminated from the contest.
- The Second Chance round (Andra chansen) took place on 14 March 2004. "Olé Olé" performed by Andrés Esteche and "Min kärlek" performed by Shirley Clamp qualified to the final.

==== Final ====
The final took place on 20 March 2004 at the Globe Arena in Stockholm.

R/O	Artist	Song	Jury	Televote	Total	Place
1	Shirley Clamp	"Min kärlek"	86	88	174	2
2	Sandra Dahlberg	"Här stannar jag kvar"	8	11	19	8
3	Andrés Esteche	"Olé Olé"	14	0	14	9
4	Hanson, Carson and Malmkvist	"C'est la vie"	7	0	7	10
5	E-Type feat. Nana	"Paradise"	31	44	75	5
6	Lena Philipsson	"Det gör ont"	100	132	232	1
7	Fame	"Vindarna vänder oss"	66	0	66	6
8	After Dark	"La dolce vita"	46	110	156	3
9	Sara Löfgren	"Som stormen"	30	22	52	7
10	Petra Nielsen	"Tango! Tango!"	85	66	151	4

== At Eurovision ==
For the Eurovision Song Contest 2004, a semi-final round was introduced in order to accommodate the influx of nations that wanted to compete in the contest. Since Sweden placed 5th in the previous contest year, Sweden automatically qualified to compete in the final along with the Big Four countries and nine other nations that were also successful in the 2003 Contest.

Lena sang "Det gör ont" in its English version, "It Hurts". Lena appeared on stage with her backing singers lined up on the side. Her performance and attire were similar to her Melodifestivalen performance. Sweden closed the contest performing last in the 24th spot and eventually making their way up to a joint 5th place with 170 points, receiving 4 sets of 12-points, meaning that Sweden automatically qualified for the final in the 2005 contest.

=== Voting ===
Below is a breakdown of points awarded to and by Sweden in the semi-final and grand final of the contest. The nation awarded its 12 points to Serbia and Montenegro in the semi-final and in the grand final of the contest.

Following the release of the televoting figures by the EBU after the conclusion of the competition, it was revealed that a total of 381,495 televotes were cast in Sweden during the two shows: 86,667 votes during the semi-final and 294,828 votes during the final.

==== Points awarded to Sweden ====
Points awarded to Sweden (Final)
Score	Country
12 points	Denmark; Finland; Ireland; Norway
10 points	Estonia; Poland
8 points	Iceland; Latvia; United Kingdom
7 points	Romania
6 points	Lithuania
5 points	Andorra; Cyprus; Israel; Malta; Portugal; Spain
4 points	Albania; Belarus; Serbia and Montenegro
3 points	France; Germany; Russia; Turkey
2 points	Belgium; Bosnia and Herzegovina; Macedonia; Slovenia; Ukraine
1 point	Austria

==== Points awarded by Sweden ====
Points awarded by Sweden (Semi-final)
Score	Country
12 points	Serbia and Montenegro
10 points	Bosnia and Herzegovina
8 points	Finland
7 points	Albania
6 points	Ukraine
5 points	Denmark
4 points	Greece
3 points	Cyprus
2 points	Macedonia
1 point	Estonia

Points awarded by Sweden (Final)
Score	Country
12 points	Serbia and Montenegro
10 points	Ukraine
8 points	Bosnia and Herzegovina
7 points	Albania
6 points	Cyprus
5 points	Turkey
4 points	Greece
3 points	Norway
2 points	United Kingdom
1 point	Poland
