= List of songs about Stockholm =

This article lists songs about Stockholm, set there, or named after a location or feature of the city.

It is not intended to include songs where Stockholm is simply "name-checked" along with various other cities.

== List ==
- "19Hundra80Sju" by Imperiet
- "Ah Stockholm" by Marty Willson-Piper
- "Attention, Stockholm!" by Virna Lindt
- "Bajen" by Kenta Gustafsson
- "Balladen om det stora slagsmålet på Tegelbacken" by Olle Adolphson
- "Balladen om eken" by Fred Åkerström
- "Balladen om en gammal knarkare" by Thåström
- "Columbus" by Kent
- "Där har du grabben som har greppet direkt" by Sigge Fürst
- "De e knas" by The Latin Kings
- "Du & Jag & Stockholm" by Plura Jonsson
- "Ekenskisen" by Lasse Dahlquist
- "En vacker död stad" by Thåström
- "Estocolmo" by Dj Méndez
- "Ett enkelt rum på Sabbatsberg" by John Holm
- "Fotbollsjazzen" by Elof Ahrle
- "Från Djursholm till Danvikstull" by Orup
- "Från Söder har Stockholm fått färgen" by Carl Anton
- "Fredrik Snortare & Cecilia Synd" by Petter
- "Fröken Gull ifrån Skanstull" by Johnny Bode
- "Fulla för kärlekens skull" by Eldkvarn
- "Gustav Lindströms visa" by Olle Adolphson
- "Hammarbysången" by Plura
- "Har du vart i Stockholm?" by Dungen
- "Hem till Stockholm stad" by Svante Thuresson feat. Mats Ronander
- "Höghus, låghus, dårhus" by Imperiet
- "Huddinge, Huddinge" by Hoola Bandoola Band
- "Huddinge, Tullinge, Tumba..." by Magnus Härenstam
- "Hum, hum från Humlegården" by Ragnar Borgedahl
- "I Stockholm" by Lars Winnerbäck
- "Into the Light" by Weeping Willows
- "Jag kommer i kväll under balkongen" by Karl Wehle
- "Jitterbug från Söder" by Alice Babs
- "Just idag är jag stark" by Kenta Gustafsson
- "Just idag är jag stark" by Plura
- "Klarabergsviadukten" by Lorentz & Sakarias
- "Kontroll i Stockholm" by Imperiet
- "Kungsholmsloppet" by Eldkvarn
- "Mamma Pappa Barn" by Ebba Grön
- "Måne över Stureplan" by Monica Zetterlund
- ""Meet me in Stockholm" by Sir Douglas Quintet
- "Mina drömmars stad" by Jigs
- "Miss Huddinge -72" by Thåström
- "Mona Tumbas Slim Club" by Ebba Grön
- "När luffarna slipper att vandra" by Åsa Jinder
- "Odenplan Sthlm" by Mange Schmidt
- "O' Stockholm" by Marty Willson-Piper
- "På min mammas gata" by Lennart Skoglund
- "Packad i Stockholm (igen)" by Svensk Pop
- "Peace and Love i Sthlm City" by Stefan Sundström
- "Please Come Home to Hamngatan" by The Mountain Goats
- "Pokerkväll i Vårby Gård" by Florence Valentin
- "Sakta vi gå genom stan" by Monica Zetterlund
- "Söderjäntans lördag" by Åke Söderblom
- "Söders kors" by Eldkvarn
- "Solna" by Titiyo
- "Somewhere In Stockholm" by Avicii
- "Somliga går med trasiga skor" by Eldkvarn
- "Sommar i Stockholm" by Mauro Scocco
- "Sommarbarn" by Eva Dahlgren
- "Stenad i Stockholm" by Perssons Pack (feat. Annika Norlin)
- "Sthlm City" by Ken Ring
- "Sthlm kallar" by Bruket
- "Sthlm, Sthlm" by Olle Ljungström
- "Stockholm" by Mattias Alkberg BD
- "Stockholm" by Jean-Louis Aubert
- "Stockholm" by Euroboys
- "Stockholm" by Jason Isbell
- "Stockholm" by Kenta Gustafsson
- "Stockholm" by Ludvig Käll
- "Stockholm" by New Fast Automatic Daffodils
- "Stockholm" by Orup
- "Stockholm" by Pugh Rogefeldt
- "Stockholm Calling" by Sophia Somajo
- "Stockholm City (Live '98)" by Ulf Lundell
- "Stockholm i mitt hjärta" by Lasse Berghagen
- "Stockholm i mitt hjärta" by Petter
- "Stockholm i natt" by Peter Jöback
- "Stockholm i strålande väder" by Carl Johan Vallgren
- "Stockholm serenad" by Lorentz & M.Sakarias
- "Stockholm Syndrome" by Muse
- "Stockholm Syndrome" by One Direction
- "Stockholm, sett snett uppifran" by Vapnet
- "Stockholms kyss" by Lars Winnerbäck
- "Stockholms pärlor" by Ebba Grön
- "Stockholms ström" by Aston Reymers Rivaler
- "Stockholmsmelodi" by Sven-Bertil Taube
- "Stockholmsserenad" by Adolphson och Falk
- "Stockholmsungar" by Kalle Nämndeman
- "Stolta stad" by Fred Åkerström
- "They Are Stone Swallowers" by The Mountain Goats
- "Tjockhult" by Dag Vag
- "Tre gringos" by Just D
- "Världens bästa Karlsson" by Georg Wadenius
- "Vatten" by Robert Broberg
- "Vi hänger me'" by Nacka Skoglund
- "Vinden har vänt" by Petter
- "We’re Only In It for the Drugs No. 1" by Ebba Grön
- "Zealots of Stockholm" by Childish Gambino
