= Melodifestivalen 2004 =

Swedish music competition

Dates and venue
- Heat 1: 21 February 2004
- Heat 2: 28 February 2004
- Heat 3: 6 March 2004
- Heat 4: 13 March 2004
- Second chance: 14 March 2004
- Final: 20 March 2004

Production
- Broadcaster: Sveriges Television (SVT)
- Director: Sven Stojanovic
- Presenters: Charlotte Perrelli; Ola Lindholm; Peter Settman

Participants
- Number of entries: 32
- Number of finalists: 10

Vote
- Voting system: Heats and Second chance: 100% public vote Final: 50% public vote, 50% jury vote
- Winning song: "Det gör ont" by Lena Philipsson

Melodifestivalen 2004 was the 44th edition of the Swedish music competition Melodifestivalen, which was organised by Sveriges Television (SVT) and took place over a five-week period between 21 February and 20 March 2004. The winner of the competition was Lena Philipsson with the song "Det gör ont". She represented Sweden in the Eurovision Song Contest 2004 with the English version of the song, "It hurts", where she came fifth with 170 points.

== Format ==
The heats of Melodifestivalen 2004 began on 21 February 2004. Ten songs from these heats qualified for the final on March 20, 2004. This was the third year that a heat format had been used for the competition.

Competition Schedule
Show	Date	City	Venue
Heat 1	21 February 2004	Karlstad	Löfbergs Lila Arena
Heat 2	28 February 2004	Gothenburg	Scandinavium
Heat 3	6 March 2004	Umeå	Umeå Arena
Heat 4	13 March 2004	Malmö	Malmömässan
Second chance	14 March 2004	Stockholm	Hotel Rival
Final	20 March 2004	Stockholm	Stockholm Globe Arena

The Viewers' Choice round was renamed to Second Chance, with the format remaining the same.

=== Wildcards ===
Unlike past years, where all Melodifestivalen participants were chosen by a selection jury, in 2004, four out of the 32 participants were selected directly by the contest's producers, in order to increase musical and artistic breadth. Each artist, called "wildcard", participated in a different heat. The wildcards were the following:

Artist	Song	Heat
Niklas Andersson	"Tro på mig"	Heat 1
E-Type	"Paradise"	Heat 2
Hanson, Carson & Malmkvist	"C'est la vie"	Heat 3
Lena Philipsson	"Det gör ont"	Heat 4

== Competing entries ==
Artist	Song	Songwriter(s)
After Dark	"La dolce vita"	Larry Forsberg; Lennart Wastesson; Sven-Inge Sjöberg
Anders Borgius	"Just Like Me"	Anders Borgius
Andrés Esteche	"Olé Olé"	Johan Fransson (artist); Niklas Edberger; Tim Larsson; Tobias Lundgren
Anne-Lie Rydé	"Säg att du har ångrat dig"	Thomas G:son; Tony Johansson
Autolove	"Bulletproof Heart"	Gustave Lund; Peder Ernerot
Baccara	"Soy tu Venus"	Mats Jansson; Robert Habolin; Robert Olausson
Bosson	"Efharisto"	Ingela Forsman; Bobby Ljunggren; Henrik Wikström
Bubbles	"Blow The Spot"	Joacim Persson; Niclas Molinder; Pelle Ankarberg
E-Type	"Paradise"	Fredrik Ekdahl; Martin Eriksson
Emil Sigfridsson	"Innan mörkret faller"	Johan Fransson; Niklas Edberger; Tim Larsson; Tobias Lundgren
Fame	"Vindarna vänder oss"	Dan Attlerud; Henrik Sethsson; Pontus Assarsson
Fre	"Äntligen"	Henok Fre; Jonatan Fre; Putte Nelsson; Roberto Martorell
Fredrik Kempe	"Finally"	Fredrik Kempe
Gladys del Pilar	"Baby I Can't Stop"	Daniel Eklund; Mats Hedström
Hanson, Carson & Malmkvist	"C'est la vie"	Thomas G:son
Itchycoo	"Super Mega Nova"	Håkan Glänte; Mia Bergström; Tobias Gustavsson
Jennifer Escola	"You Are The Sunshine Of My Life"	Ari Lehtonen; Dick Cruslock
Jocke Bergström	"Still Believe"	Emil Heiling; Johan Bejerholm; Jonas Sahlin
Karl Martindahl	"Love Turns Water Into Wine"	Michael Persson; Peter Broman
LaGaylia Frazier	"It's In The Stars"	Thomas Thörnholm
LaRoxx	"(Are U) Ready Or Not"	Jon Hällgren; Koshiyar Mehdipoor; Magnus Sagrén
Lena Philipsson	"Det gör ont"	Thomas "Orup" Eriksson
Lotta Nilsson & Glenn Borgkvist	"Boom-bang-a-bang"	David Clewett; Fredrik Lenander; Larry Forsberg; Lars Erlandsson; Lennart Wastesson; Sven-Inge Sjöberg
Niklas Andersson	"Tro på mig"	Lasse Berghagen
Nina & Kim	"En gång för alla"	Gustav Eurén; Karl Eurén; Niclas Arn
Pandora	"Runaway"	Johan Fransson; Niklas Edberger; Tim Larsson; Tobias Lundgren
Pay TV	"Trendy Discothèque"	Håkan Lidbo; Ulrika Lidbo
Petra Nielsen	"Tango! Tango!"	Thomas G:son
Sandra Dahlberg	"Här stannar jag kvar"	Johan Becker; Sandra Dahlberg
Sara Löfgren	"Som stormen"	Carina Danielsson-Bergsman; Eddie Jonsson; Lars Diedricson
Sarek	"Älvorna"	Dan Attlerud|Lars Diedricson|Marcos Ubeda
Shirley Clamp	"Min kärlek"	Ingela Forsman; Bobby Ljunggren; Henrik Wikström

== Contest overview ==
=== Heat 1 ===
The first heat took place on 21 February 2004 at the Löfbergs Lila Arena in Karlstad. 3,293,000 viewers watched the heat live. A total of 590,453 votes were cast, with a total of SEK 832,539 collected for Radiohjälpen.

R/O	Artist	Song	Votes		Place	Result
R/O	Artist	Song	Round 1	Round 2	Place	Result
1	Nina & Kim	"En gång för alla"	19,272	—N/a	7	Out
2	Jocke Bergström	"Still Believe"	14,737	—N/a	8	Out
3	Sarek	"Älvorna"	35,660	48,368	4	Second Chance
4	Karl Martindahl	"Love Turns Water Into Wine"	38,123	52,923	3	Second Chance
5	LaGaylia Frazier	"It's In The Stars"	25,237	32,690	5	Out
6	Sara Löfgren	"Som stormen"	51,674	69,791	2	Final
7	Niklas Andersson	"Tro på mig"	24,476	—N/a	6	Out
8	Petra Nielsen	"Tango! Tango!"	80,558	95,030	1	Final

=== Heat 2 ===
The second heat took place on 28 February 2004 at the Scandinavium in Gothenburg. 3,307,000 viewers watched the heat live. A total of 549,315 votes were cast, with a total of SEK 774,534 collected for Radiohjälpen.

R/O	Artist	Song	Votes		Place	Result
R/O	Artist	Song	Round 1	Round 2	Place	Result
1	Fredrik Kempe	"Finally"	28,371	45,741	3	Second Chance
2	Baccara	"Soy tu Venus"	10,609	—N/a	7	Out
3	Fame	"Vindarna vänder oss"	72,185	82,434	2	Final
4	Jennifer Escola	"You Are The Sunshine Of My Life"	3,828	—N/a	8	Out
5	Pay TV	"Trendy Discothèque"	17,657	—N/a	6	Out
6	Anne-Lie Rydé	"Säg att du har ångrat dig"	30,376	34,838	4	Second Chance
7	LaRoxx	"(Are U) Ready Or Not"	19,075	24,392	5	Out
8	E-Type	"Paradise"	86,022	92,957	1	Final

=== Heat 3 ===
The third heat took place on 6 March 2004 at the Umeå Arena in Umeå. 3,138,000 viewers watched the heat live. A total of 487,367 votes were cast, with a total of SEK 687,187 collected for Radiohjälpen.

R/O	Artist	Song	Votes		Place	Result
R/O	Artist	Song	Round 1	Round 2	Place	Result
1	Bubbles	"Blow The Spot"	32,852	35,265	4	Second Chance
2	Emil Sigfridsson	"Innan mörkret faller"	23,106	26,861	5	Out
3	Gladys del Pilar	"Baby I Can't Stop"	9,073	—N/a	8	Out
4	Sandra Dahlberg	"Här stannar jag kvar"	55,307	79,410	1	Final
5	Itchycoo	"Super Mega Nova"	11,837	—N/a	7	Out
6	Hanson, Carson & Malmkvist	"C'est la vie"	45,140	52,267	2	Final
7	Autolove	"Bulletproof Heart"	20,302	—N/a	6	Out
8	Bosson	"Efharisto"	45,355	44,334	3	Second Chance

=== Heat 4 ===
The fourth heat took place on 13 March 2004 at the Malmömässan in Malmö. 3,277,000 viewers watched the heat live. A total of 512,593 votes were cast, with a total of SEK 722,756 collected for Radiohjälpen.

R/O	Artist	Song	Votes		Place	Result
R/O	Artist	Song	Round 1	Round 2	Place	Result
1	Lena Philipsson	"Det gör ont"	56,414	77,775	1	Final
2	Anders Borgius	"Just Like Me"	16,923	—N/a	7	Out
3	Lotta Nilsson & Glenn Borgkvist	"Boom-bang-a-bang"	17,670	—N/a	6	Out
4	After Dark	"La dolce vita"	57,364	59,860	2	Final
5	Pandora	"Runaway"	18,155	26,628	5	Out
6	Fre	"Äntligen"	15,712	—N/a	8	Out
7	Shirley Clamp	"Min kärlek"	40,066	42,580	4	Second Chance
8	Andrés Esteche	"Olé Olé"	52,867	57,207	3	Second Chance

=== Second chance ===
The second chance round took place on 14 March 2004 at the Hotel Rival in Stockholm. 2,293,000 viewers watched the show live. A total of 358,250 votes were cast, with a total of SEK 505,132 collected for Radiohjälpen.

R/O	Artist	Song	Votes	Place	Result
1	Sarek	"Älvorna"	40,497	5	Out
2	Karl Martindahl	"Love Turns Water Into Wine"	56,818	3	Out
3	Fredrik Kempe	"Finally"	26,438	8	Out
4	Anne-Lie Rydé	"Säg att du har ångrat dig"	27,678	7	Out
5	Bubbles	"Blow The Spot"	41,249	4	Out
6	Bosson	"Efharisto"	35,855	6	Out
7	Shirley Clamp	"Min kärlek"	57,343	2	Final
8	Andrés Esteche	"Olé Olé"	72,372	1	Final

=== Final ===
The final took place on 20 March 2004 at the Stockholm Globe Arena in Stockholm. 4,105,000 viewers watched the show live. A total of 1,401,430 votes were cast, with a total of SEK 1,975,992 collected for Radiohjälpen.

R/O	Artist	Song	Juries	Televote		Total	Place
R/O	Artist	Song	Juries	Votes	Points	Total	Place
1	Shirley Clamp	"Min kärlek"	86	176,343	88	174	2
2	Sandra Dahlberg	"Här stannar jag kvar"	8	82,492	11	19	8
3	Andrés Esteche	"Olé Olé"	14	79,723	0	14	9
4	Hanson, Carson & Malmkvist	"C'est la vie"	7	61,190	0	7	10
5	E-Type	"Paradise"	31	159,157	44	75	5
6	Lena Philipsson	"Det gör ont"	100	298,722	132	232	1
7	Fame	"Vindarna vänder oss"	66	76,003	0	66	6
8	After Dark	"La dolce vita"	46	209,795	110	156	3
9	Sara Löfgren	"Som stormen"	30	85,132	22	52	7
10	Petra Nielsen	"Tango! Tango!"	85	172,873	66	151	4

Detailed jury votes
R/O	Song	Luleå	Umeå	Sundsvall	Falun	Karlstad	Stockholm	Örebro	Norrköping	Gothenburg	Växjö	Malmö	Total
1	"Min kärlek"	6	8	6	6	12	12	2	10	6	10	8	86
2	"Här stannar jag kvar"		4					1			1	2	8
3	"Olé Olé"					2	1	10	1				14
4	"C'est la vie"	2				4				1			7
5	"Paradise"	1	1	10	1		2		2	10		4	31
6	"Det gör ont"	8	6	12	12	8	6	6	8	12	12	10	100
7	"Vindarna vänder oss"	10	10	4	2	6	10	4	6	4	4	6	66
8	"La dolce vita"		2	1	4	1	4	8	12		2	12	46
9	"Som stormen"	4		2	10					8	6		30
10	"Tango! Tango!"	12	12	8	8	10	8	12	4	2	8	1	85
Jury spokespersons
Luleå – Martin Sourra; Umeå – Kent Larsen; Sundsvall – Åsa Vilbäck; Falun – Nemah Hansson; Karlstad – Roger Ohlsson; Stockholm – Martin Melin; Örebro – Roxana Sundström; Norrköping – Zübeyde Simsek; Gothenburg – Alexandra Zazzi; Växjö – Torbjörn Ambré; Malmö – Emma Andersson

== Ratings ==
Viewing figures by show
Show	Air date	Viewers (millions)	Ref.
Heat 1	21 February 2004	3.293	
Heat 2	28 February 2004	3.307	
Heat 3	6 March 2004	3.138	
Heat 4	13 March 2004	3.277	
Second chance	14 March 2004	2.293	
Final	20 March 2004	4.105	

== See also ==
- Eurovision Song Contest 2004
- Sweden in the Eurovision Song Contest
- Sweden in the Eurovision Song Contest 2004
