= Explosiw =

Studio album by Siw Malmkvist
- Released: August 1976
- Recorded: January–May 1976
- Studio: Metronome, Stockholm, Sweden
- Genre: schlager
- Label: Metronome

Siw Malmkvist chronology
Greatest Hits 1958-75 Vol 1 (1975)	Explosiw (1976)	Pippi Långstrump på Folkan (1980)

Explosiw is a Siw Malmkvist studio album, released in August 1976 on the Metronome Records label. It was recorded between January–May of that year. The album was Malmkvist's last for Metronome Records before deciding to quit as a recording artist. She subsequently returned sporadically.

== Track listing ==
=== Side A ===
1. Jag har en fågel - Torsten Wallin
2. Genom dimmor och dis (One Day in Your Life) - Renée Armand, Sam Brown, Marie Bergman
3. Jag vill ha slowfox igen (I Wanna Slow Dance Again) – Helms, Hirsch, Wayne
4. Jag låter bli dej (Heat Wave), - Lamont Dozier, Brian Holland, Eddie Holland, Bo Carlgren
5. Kalle me' felan - (Gösta Linderholm)
6. Jag gillar dans (I Love to Love) -James Bolden, Jack Robinson

=== Side B ===
1. Du kom hem (Welcome Back) -Sebastian John, Bobo Karlsson, Ingrid Larsson
2. I tid och rum (He Closes his Eyes)- Charles Fox, Bo Rehnberg
3. Känslor (Feelings) - Morris Albert, Patrice Hellberg
4. Min jord (Bravo monsieur le monde) -Michel Fugain, Kajenn
5. Endera dan (Some of these Days) - Shelton Brooks, Bo Carlgren
6. Sovsång - Totte Wallin

== Charts ==
Chart (1976)	Peak position
Sweden (Sverigetopplistan)	38
