= Älvorna =

Single by Sarek

from the album Sarek
- A-side: "Älvorna"
- B-side: "Älvorna" (karaoke version)
- Released: March 2004
- Genre: ethnopop
- Label: S56
- Songwriters: Lars "Dille" Diedricson, Marcos Ubeda, Dan Attlerud

Sarek singles chronology
"Solen glimmar" (2003)	"Älvorna" (2004)	"Medan stjärnorna vandrar" (2004)

"Älvorna" is a song written by Lars "Dille" Diedricson, Marcos Ubeda and Dan Attlerud. The song was performed by Sarek at Melodifestivalen 2004, where it was knocked out at Andra chansen.

The single peaked at number eight on the Swedish Singles Chart. The song also charted at Svensktoppen for two weeks between 4 April-25 April 2004 with two positions at number ten before leaving the chart.

== Track listing ==
1. Älvorna - 2:58
2. Älvorna (karaoke version) - 2:58

== Charts ==
Chart (2004)	Peak position
Sweden (Sverigetopplistan)	8
