= C'est la vie (Carson, Hanson and Malmkvist song) =

Single by Ann-Louise Hanson, Towa Carson & Siw Malmkvist
- A-side: "C'est la vie"
- B-side: "C'est la vie" (sing along-version)
- Released: 2004
- Genre: schlager
- Label: M&L Records
- Songwriter: Thomas G:son

C'est la vie is a Swedish language song written by Thomas G:son, and originally performed by Ann-Louise Hanson, Towa Carson and Siw Malmkvist at Melodifestivalen 2004.

== Charts ==
The song peaked at 33rd position at the Swedish singles chart. It was tested for Svensktoppen, and on 25 April 2004 it entered 7th position. The song's Svensktoppen visit lasted for three weeks, peaking at 6th position on 2 May 2004.

== Charts ==
Chart (2004)	Peak position
Sweden (Sverigetopplistan)	33
