= (Åh) När ni tar saken i egna händer =

Single by After Dark
- A-side: "(Åh) När ni tar saken i egna händer"
- Released: 28 February 2007
- Genre: pop
- Label: M&L Records
- Songwriters: Henrik Wikström, Kent Olsson

After Dark singles chronology
"Det är då jag älskar dig" (2004)	"(Åh) När ni tar saken i egna händer" (2007)	"Kom ut som en stjärna" (2016)

(Åh) När ni tar saken i egna händer is a song by After Dark that charted at Svensktoppen, entering on 18 March 2007, but remained on the chart for only one week.

== Single track listing ==
1. Åh, när ni tar saken i egna händer (Radio Version)
2. Åh, när ni tar saken i egna händer (SoundFactory Masterclub Mix)
3. Åh, när ni tar saken i egna händer (SoundFactory Radio Edit)
4. Åh, när ni tar saken i egna händer (Karaoke Version)

== Charts ==
=== Weekly charts ===
Chart (2007)	Peak position
Sweden (Sverigetopplistan)	15

=== Year-end charts ===
Chart (2007)	Position
Sweden (Sverigetopplistan)	92
