= Bernhard Folkestad =

Norwegian painter and writer (1879–1933)

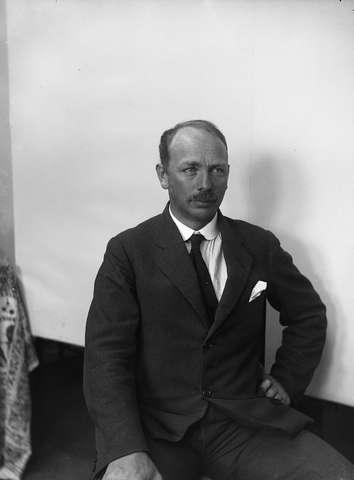
- Bernhard Folkestad in 1920.
- Born: 13 June 1879; London
- Died: 9 March 1933 (aged 53)
- Occupation: Painter
- Children: Mildred Mehle

Bernhard Folkestad (13 June 1879 – 9 March 1933) was a Norwegian naturalist painter and essayist.

== Biography ==
Bernhard Dorotheus Folkestad was born in London, where his father assisted at the Norwegian Seamen's Mission in England. In 1882, the family moved to Drammen, where Bernhard grew up in the borough of Strømsø.

After graduating at Drammen Latin School in 1896, he started as an apprentice in decoration discipline in Christiania (now Oslo) before he went to Copenhagen in 1902. Here he spent a time with Kristian Zahrtmann. From 1903 to 1904, he was a pupil of the naturalist Laurits Tuxen at the Peder Severin Krøyer painting school.

After returning to Norway in 1904, he lived in Asker. Folkestad debuted in 1905 at the Autumn Exhibition in Oslo with a painting which was purchased for the National Gallery. Folkestad went on a study trip to Lübeck, Hamburg and Amsterdam during 1907. In 1909, Folkestad was in Paris at Académie Colarossi with Christian Krogh. From 1910 to 1911, he was in Berlin, returning in 1913 to Paris.

In 1916, the family moved to Oslo. About the same time, he bought a cottage on Brøtsøy in Tjøme Municipality where he built a studio. Starting in 1921, Folkestad first published an essay. Subsequently, writing took more time away from his easel. As an essayist, he principally produced a series of articles and drawings for Norwegian newspapers.

His paintings Mørkeloftet from 1905, and Høns i høstsol and Grønnsaker from 1906 are all located in the National Gallery of Norway. Among his books are Svingdøren from 1926, Sol og morild from 1929, and Gullfisken from 1933.

== Selected Paintings ==
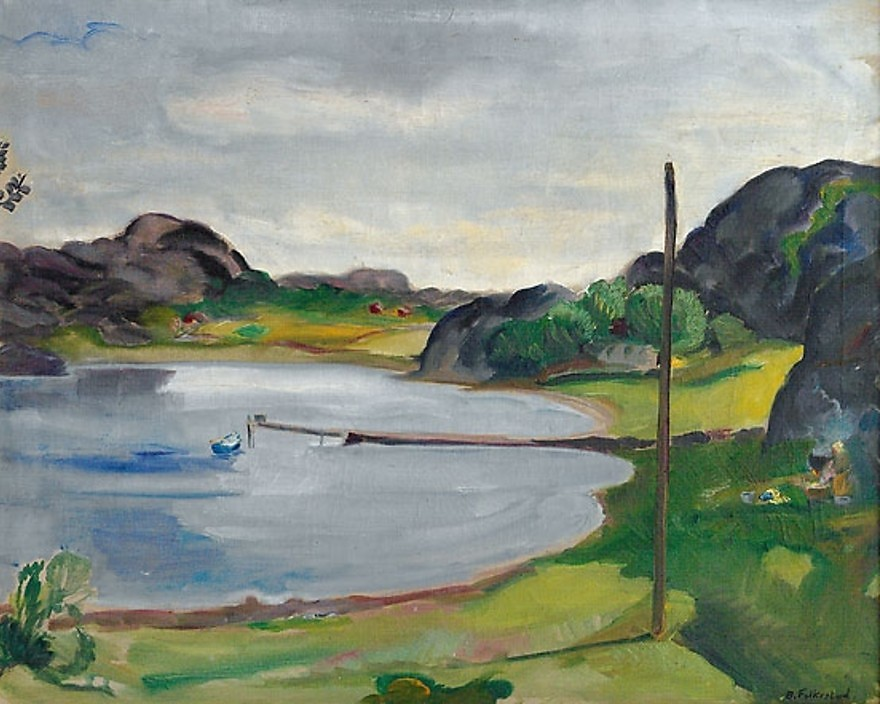
Bay with a Rowboat,
unknown date

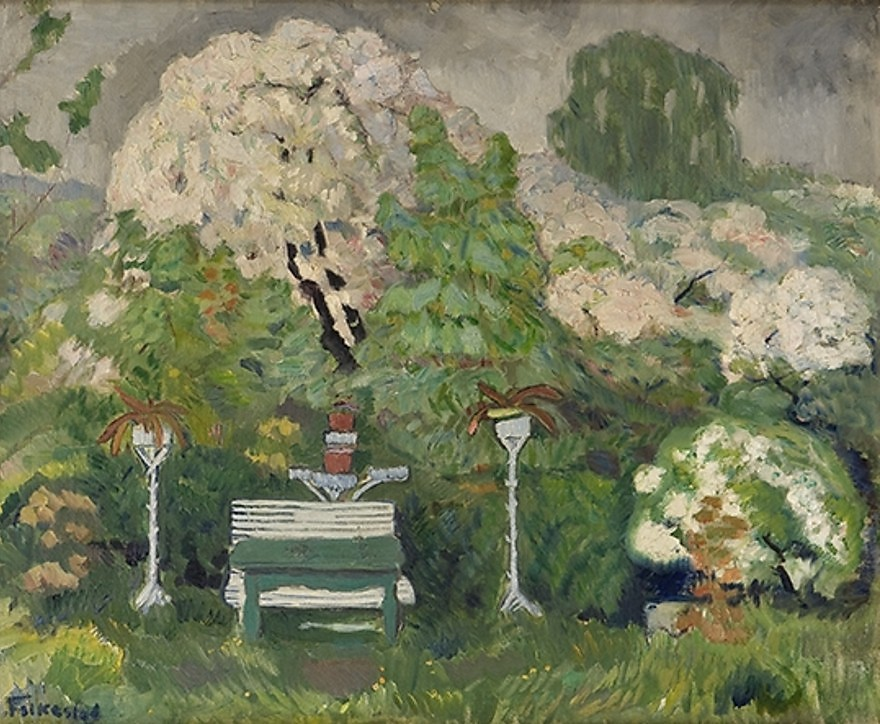
View of a Garden,
unknown date

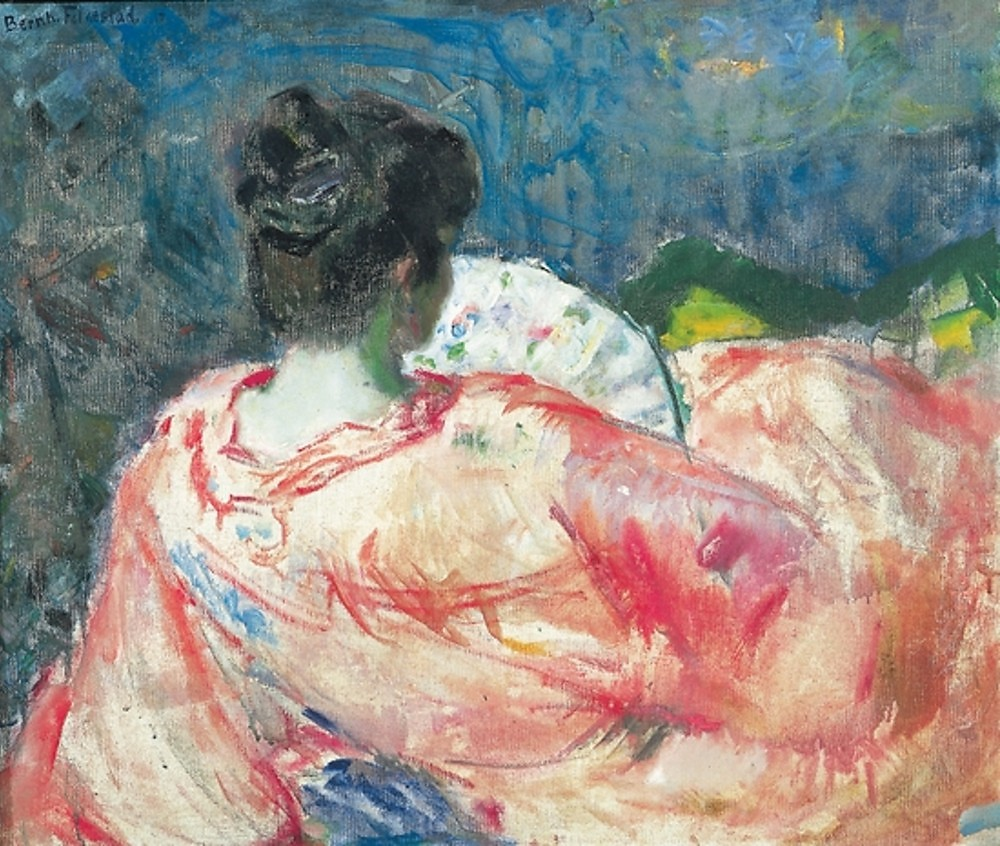
Woman with Fan, 1917

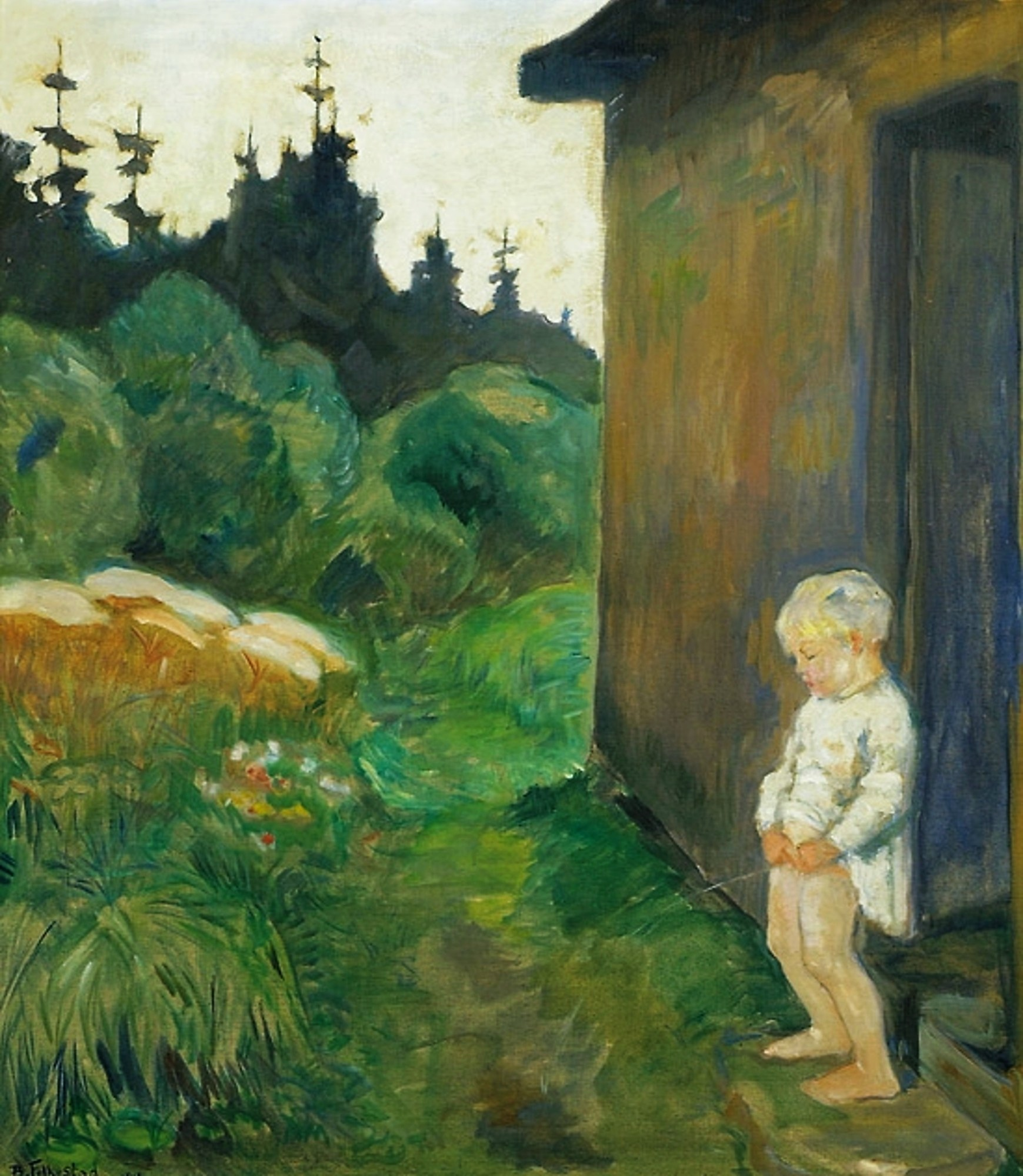
Little Boy, 1916
