= Zididada =

Danish pop band

ZIDIDADA
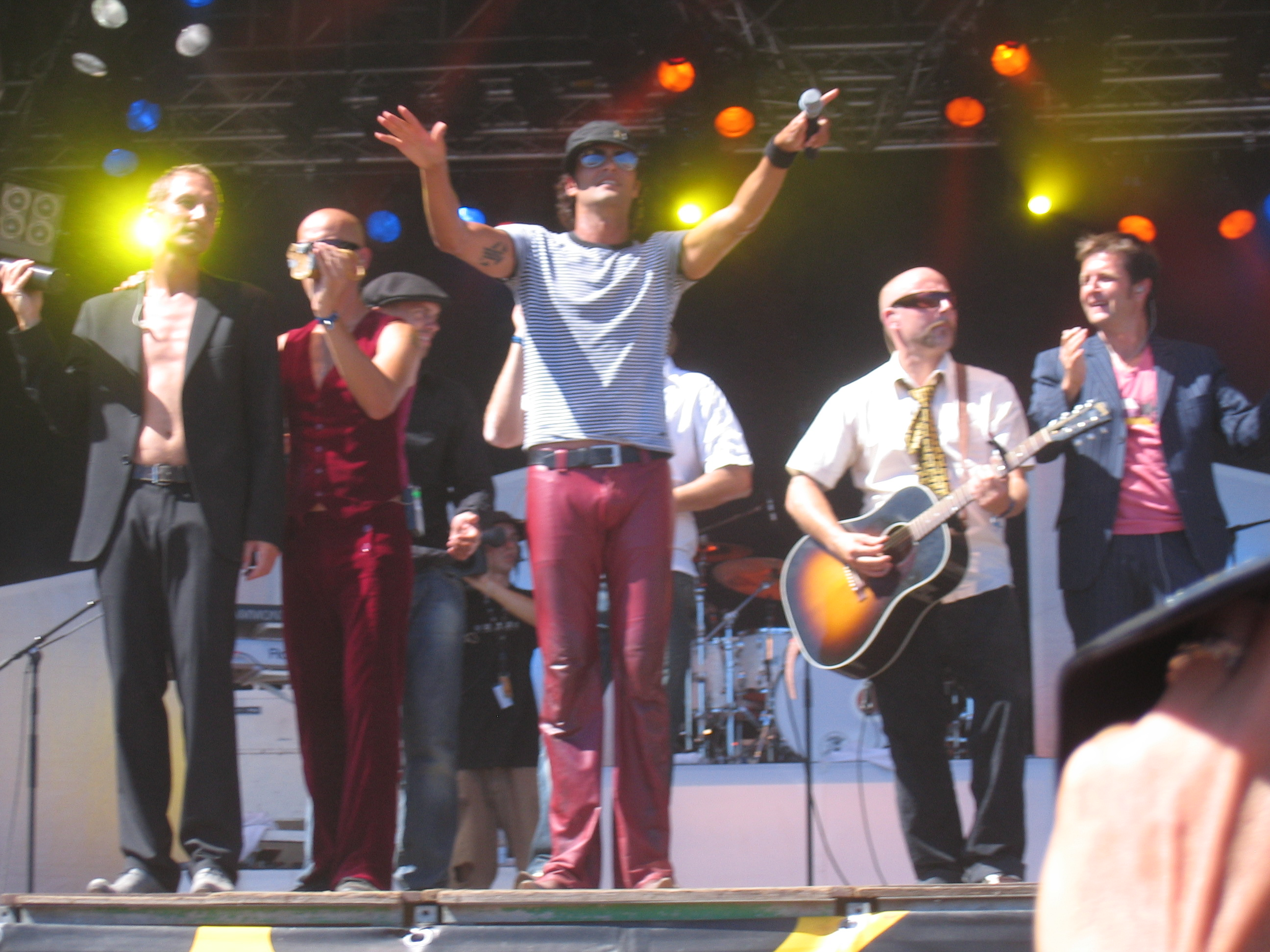
- Zididada in Langelandsfestivalen 2006

Background information
- Origin: Denmark
- Genres: Pop rock
- Years active: 1997-present
- Members: Jimmy Bacoll (former Colding); Hans Jacob Krausmann; Lars Storck; Lars Maasbøl; Anders Heidelbach Cornelins; Jacob Davidsen
- Past members: Danny Linde; Björn Jönsson
- Website: www.zididada.com

ZIDIDADA is a Danish pop music band formed in 1997 by Jimmy Bacoll (former Colding) and Danny Linde. They picked the name as a notation for eternal sun. The band took part in 2004 in the Dansk Melodi Grand Prix 2004, the selection process for Danish entry to Eurovision Song Contest 2004 to be held in Istanbul with the song "Prinsesse" ending up with 46 points and second overall to the winning song "Sig det' løgn" by Thomas Thordarson that garnered 60 points to represent Denmark. In 2008, the band performed "Take It All", its theme song for the wrestling show, WWE Judgment Day 2008.

== Members ==
Present members

- Jimmy Bacoll (former Colding) – vocals
- Hans Jacob Krausmann – keyboard, harp, guitar and vocals
- Lars Storck – percussion, guitar and vocals
- Lars Maasbøl – guitar
- Anders Heidelbach Cornelins – bass
- Jacob Davidsen – drums

Former members

- Danny Linde – guitar (founding member) – Left the band to concentrate on his hard rock music career
- Björn Jönsson – drums (Band member 1999–2020) – Died from cancer age 44.

== Discography ==
| Year | Album | Peak positions |
| Year | Album | DEN |
|---|---|---|
| 1999 | Welcome To ZIDIDADA | – |
| 2000 | Have A ZIDIDADA Day | 32 |
| 2002 | Happy Fool | 17 |
| 2004 | Princess | 2 |
| 2005 | Music Makers | 17 |
| 2008 | Take It All | 12 |
| 2013 | Fix Your Heart | 9 |
