= Sind Sie der Graf von Luxemburg =

Single by Dorthe Kollo
- A-side: "Sind Sie der Graf von Luxemburg"
- B-side: "Was ist bloß mit dem Torero los?"
- Released: 1968
- Label: Philips
- Songwriters: Henry Mayer (music), Fred Weyrich (lyrics)

Sind Sie der Graf von Luxemburg is a song written by Henry Mayer (music) and Fred Weyrich (lyrics), and recorded by Dorthe Kollo, releasing it as a single in 1968.

With lyrics in Swedish by Stikkan Anderson, the song was also recorded by Ann-Louise Hanson, as Min greve av Luxemburg. scoring a Svensktoppen hit for 13 weeks between 14 July and 6 October 1968, including topping the chart.

A Danish version was also recorded by Dorthe Kollo as Er de Greven fra Luxembourg? that same year.

A Norwegian Version was recorded by Kirsti Sparboe as Min Greve Av Luxembourg in 1968.
