= Tomas Thordarson =

- Born: Tomas Thordarsson; 1974 (age 51–52); Copenhagen, Denmark
- Origin: Denmark and Iceland
- Genre: Pop
- Occupation: Singer
- Years active: 2001–present

Tomas Thordarson (born 1974) is a Danish-Icelandic singer. He won Dansk Melodi Grand Prix 2004 with the song "Shame on You." As a result, he represented Denmark at the Eurovision Song Contest 2004. The song finished thirteenth place in the semifinal and failed to qualify.

== Musical career ==
Thordarson started his musical career at Blaagaard Statsseminarium. Then he joined a band which makes funk and soul music as a lead singer. In 2001, he participated in DR's TV program Star for a Night.

In 2004, he was nominated for LGBT Denmark's LGBT award in the category of gay of the year.

== Personal life ==
Thordarson is openly gay. He and his partner are in a registered partnership since 2003, and they had adopted a child since 2002.
