= Kom ut som en stjärna =

2016 single by After Dark

Single by After Dark
- Released: 20 February 2016
- Genre: Pop; schlager
- Length: 3:01
- Label: Warner Music Sweden
- Songwriters: Sven-Inge Sjöberg; Lennart Wastesson; Larry Forsberg; Lina Eriksson; Kent Olsson; Calle Kindbom

After Dark singles chronology
"(Åh) När ni tar saken i egna händer" (2007)	"Kom ut som en stjärna" (2016)

"Kom ut som en stjärna" (English: Come out like a star) is a song by Swedish drag act After Dark. The song was released in Sweden as a digital download on 20 February 2016, and was written by Sven-Inge Sjöberg, Lennart Wastesson, Larry Forsberg, Lina Eriksson, Kent Olsson, and Calle Kindbom. It took part in Melodifestivalen 2016, and placed last in the third semi-final. The song was recorded in Swedish, with no English counterpart.

== Charts ==
Chart (2016)	Peak position
Sweden (Sverigetopplistan)	86

== Release history ==
Region	Date	Format	Label
Sweden	20 February 2016	Digital download	Warner Music Sweden
