= Mildred Mehle =

Norwegian actress (1904–1987)

- Born: Mildred Folkestad; August 24, 1904; Kristiania (now Oslo), Norway
- Died: February 16, 1987 (aged 82); Stockholm, Sweden
- Occupation: Actress
- Spouse(s): Eyvind Mehle; Edvin Adolphson (m. 1932–1950)
- Children: Kristina Adolphson; Olle Adolphson; Kari Thomée; Per B. Adolphson
- Father: Bernhard Folkestad

Mildred Mehle (née Folkestad, August 24, 1904 – February 16, 1987) was a Norwegian actress. She appeared in three films between 1929 and 1931.

== Family ==
Mildred Mehle was the daughter of the painter Bernhard Folkestad and Kari Selvig Folkestad (1884–1926). Her first marriage was to the Norwegian radio personality Eyvind Mehle, and her second to the Swedish actor Edvin Adolphson. She was the mother of the singer Olle Adolphson and the actress Kristina Adolphson.

== Filmography ==
- 1929: Frøken statsadvokat
- 1930: Kristine Valdresdatter as a farm girl
- 1931: Halvvägs til himlen
