= Lasse Lönndahl =

Swedish actor and singer (1928–2022)

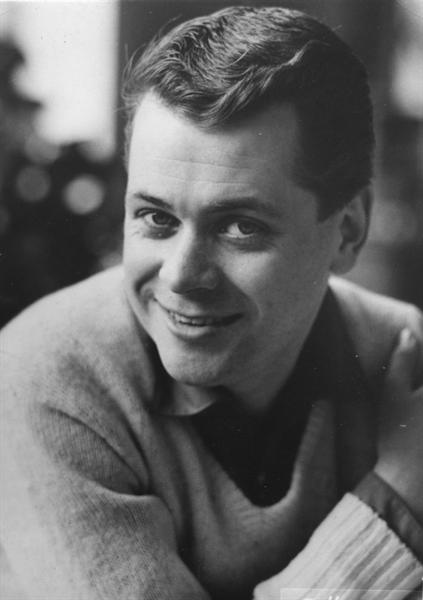
- Lönndahl in 1959
- Born: Lars Gunnar Lönndahl; 19 August 1928; Stockholm, Sweden
- Died: 26 December 2022 (aged 94)
- Occupations: Actor, singer
- Years active: 1947–2022
- Awards: Illis quorum

Lars Gunnar "Lasse" Lönndahl (Swedish pronunciation: [ˈlǎsːə ˈlø̂nːdɑːl]; 19 August 1928 – 26 December 2022) was a Swedish singer and actor. He was considered the best-known Swedish singer of the 1950s and 1960s with nicknames including "The Swedish Frank Sinatra" and "World's Oldest Teenager". Even though by the mid-1970s his career had slowed down, he was still considered arguably Sweden's most popular singer of all time and was long a very popular figure in media.

== Career ==
Lönndahl was born in Stockholm. His breakthrough was in 1949 with his first record, "Tangokavaljeren", which reached No. 2 in Sweden. After that he became one of the leading faces in popular music, scoring 12 No. 2 hit singles in the 1950s. He also made some movies in the late 1950s.

In the 1960s, he became the first singer to have a No. 1 single on the new Swedish chart Svensktoppen (the most important Swedish chart) with the 1962 single "Midnattstango". It stayed a total of 18 weeks in the charts. Between the years 1962 and 1972 he had 35 songs on the chart, with a total of 37.

== Personal life ==
Lönndahl was born in Stockholm to a Swedish mother and an English father. His father left the family early and Lönndahl rarely saw him. Lönndahl remembers his father as a man who rarely worked and lived off his wife before absconding. After Lönndahl found fame, his father tried reconnecting with his son, asking him for money. Lönndahl however, never connected with his father again as he believed too much time had passed and that his father's appearance came much too late. In late 1970, Lönndahl's seven-year-old daughter Malin and her mother died in a car accident in Los Angeles, California. After the incident, Lönndahl for a period of time went into a self-imposed exile to the United States, eluding the Swedish press. He subsequently returned to Sweden but refused to record new material, claiming it was too "onerous to be Sweden's greatest singer".

Lönndahl died on 26 December 2022, at the age of 94.

== Awards ==
Lönndahl was awarded the Illis quorum in 1993.

== Discography ==
Albums

Year	Title
1959	Hej där
1964	Med Towa & Lasse på Hamburger Börs (with Towa Carson)
1970	Möt mej efter dansen
1970	Vi två förstår varandra (with Towa Carson)
1970	Minns i November
1971	Som en saga
1971	Towa, Lars & Jan (with Towa Carson and Jan Malmsjö)
1971	En dag fylld av kärlek
1972	Romanser
1973	Lasses Låtlåda
1977	Melodibuketten
1977	Det finns en sång
1983	Kvällens sista dans
1987	Fältslag för Svensk musik (with Thore Skogman and Ewa Roos)
1987	Lars Lönndahl med Marcus Österdahls Kör och Orkester
1996	Reimers Bästa Droppar (Istället För Blommor) (with Jan Boquist Trio & Kör)
1998	Tiden går

=== EPs ===
Year	Title
1955	Ur filmen "French Can Can"
1955	Så skön som solen
1956	Livets lyckostunder
1957	Med 4 ess
1957	Kärleksbrev i sanden
1957	Ur filmen Pyjamas Leken
1958	I det blå
1958	Piccolissima Serenata
1959	My Fair Lady (With Kjerstin Dellert, Towa Carson, Tosse Bark and Mats Olsson)
1959	Piove…!
1959	L.L.
1959	Lasse
1960	Hello Young Lovers
1961	Blott för dej
1961	Marie, Marie
1961	Exodus
1961	West Side Story (With Towa Carson and Jan Malmsjö)
1961	Walt Disney Sångbok (With Towa Carson, Britt Damberg, Tosse Bark, Jan Malmsjö and Mats Olsson)
1962	Lars L
1963	Gröna, Gränna, Sköna, Sanna Sommar (With Towa Carson)
1963	Ingen kan kyssa som du
1963	Twist till menuett
1964	Cocktails för två
1965	En lilja är vit (With Towa Carson)
1966	Ernst Rolf Melodier
1966	Tusen och en natt
1966	Det händer väl kanske
1971	Tangokavaljeren

=== Singles ===
==== 1950s ====
Year	Title
1950	"Tangokavaljeren" (With the Harmony Sisters) (Note: "Tangokavaljeren" was the B-side of "Säg det i toner" by the Harmony Sisters.)
1951	"En mörkröd ros" (With the Harmony Sisters)
1951	"Om"
1951	"Nattlig serenad"
1951	"För ung"
1951	"Poetens sång" (With Ragna Ravell)
1951	"Under Paris himmel"
1952	"Blue Tango"
1953	"Röda rosor, röda läppar, purpurvin"
1953	"Tänk jag drömde"
1953	"Sången från Moulin Rouge"
1954	"That’s Amore" (With the Harmony Sisters)
1954	"Ett vänligt litet ord" (With Ingrid Almquist)
1954	"Legenden om Tina"
1955	"När natten kommer"
1955	"Under samma himmel"
1955	"För dej och mej"
1956	"Tro och kärlek"
1956	"Får jag hålla din hand i min"
1956	"Man måste vara två" (Note: "Man måste vara två" was the B-side of "Får jag hålla din hand i min".)
1956	"Livets lyckostunder"
1957	"Det blåser opp i Portugal"
1957	"Cindy min Cindy" (Note: "Cindy min Cindy" was the B-side of "Det blåser opp i Portugal".)
1957	"En grabb i Neapel"
1957	"Kärleksbrev i sanden"
1957	"Signorina"
1957	"Hernandos separée"
1957	"Melodie d'amour"
1958	"I det blå"
1958	"Jag ler mot drj"
1958	"Kom tillbaka bella mia"
1959	"Piove"
1959	"Li per li"
1959	"Venus"
1959	"Bella bambolina"
1959	"Du kysser och bedrar mig"

==== 1960s ====
Year	Title	Peak chart positions		Album
Year	Title	SWE Kvällstoppen	SWE Svensktoppen	Album
1960	"Flickor bak i bilen"	—	—	
1960	"Pappa Älskar Mamma" (With Anita Lonndahl)	—	—	
1960	"Aldrig på en Söndag"	—	—	
1961	"Marie - Marie"	—	—	
1961	"Exodus"	—	—	
1961	"På en gård på söder"	—	—	
1962	"Hello Young Lovers"	—	—	
1962	"Midnatts-tango"	19	1	
1962	"Regnet kommer snart"	—	—	
1963	"Twist till menuett"	—	3	
1963	"Rosen och vinden"	—	10	
1963	"Gröna, Gränna, Sköna, Sanna Sommar" (With Towa Carson)	—	—	
1963	"Trumslagarpojken"	14	—	
1963	"Och vinden ger svar"	—	6	
1963	"Wenn Zwei Verliebte Tanzen"	—	—	
1964	"Visa mej hur man går hem" (With Towa Carson)	—	—	
1964	"Vilken härlig sommardag"	—	—	
1964	"Hello Dolly!"	—	3	
1964	"Söker du så finner du"	—	1	
1964	"I dina kvarter"	—	—	
1965	"En röd blomma till en blond flicka"	—	—	
1965	"Om du vore här"	—	—	
1965	"Sång i solen" (With Towa Carson)	—	—	
1965	"En lilja är vit"	—	—	
1965	"Så nära som nu"	—	—	
1966	"Utan Dej" (With Towa Carson)	—	—	
1966	"Det är grabben me' chokla' i"	—	10	Ernst Rolf Melodier
1966	"Nå'n stans nå'n gång"	—	10	
1966	"Guantanamera"	—	7	
1966	"Du Lasse, Lasse Liten" (With the Osmond Brothers)	—	—	
1967	"Kvällens sista dans"	—	1	
1967	"Den sista valsen"	—	7	
1967	"Möt Mej Efter Dansen" (B-side of "Den sista valsen")	—	9	
1967	"Du och jag och våren"	—	7	
1967	"Ett Vitt Litet Hus" (B-side of "Du och jag och våren")	—	6	
1968	"Det måste vara underbart"	—	—	
1968	"Säg, Vad Har Hänt Med Vår Värld" (B-side of "Det måste vara underbart")	—	8	
1969	"Vår egen melodi"	—	8	
1969	"Tretti' da'r har September" (B-side of "Vår egen melodi")	—	8	
1969	"Hjalp! Hjalp!" (With Towa Carson and Jan Malmsjö)	—	—	

==== 1970s ====
Year	Title
1970	"Två solröda segel"
1970	"Det skall bli vi" (With Towa Carson)
1970	"Allting e' så underbart"
1971	"Jean"
1971	"Som en saga"
1971	"På en gammal bänk" (With Towa Carson)
1971	"Jag är en gentleman"
1971	"Potpurri" (With Towa Carson)
1971	"Tiden går"
1973	"Hej Du Glada Sommar"

== Filmography ==
- 1952: 69:an, sergeanten och jag
- 1956: Åsa-Nisse flyger i luften
- 1957: Johan på Snippen tar hem spelet
- 1959: Resa i toner
- 1959: Swinging at the Castle
- 1959: Sleeping Beauty (Swedish dubbing)
- 1960: Ung och grön
- 1966: Dessa fantastiska smålänningar med sina finurliga maskiner
- 1995: The Swan Princess (Swedish dubbing)

== See also ==
- List of Swedes in music
