= Balladen om det stora slagsmålet på Tegelbacken =

Song by Olle Adolphson

from the album "Resan hem" (EP)
- Language: Swedish
- Released: October 1963
- Label: Telefunken
- Songwriter: Olle Adolphson
- Composer: Olle Adolphson

Balladen om det stora slagsmålet på Tegelbacken is a song written by Olle Adolphson, and originally recorded by himself on with Hans Wahlgrens orkester on the EP record Resan hem, released in October 1963. The song lyrics describe early 20th century Stockholm gang activity.

Siw Malmkvist recorded the song on the EP record Tror du att jag förlorad är, released in July 1965. Her recording also entered Svensktoppen, entering 7th place on 4 September 1965, only to be knocked out the upcoming week. In 1968 the song was also included on her album Från Jazzbacillen till Balladen om det stora slagsmålet på Tegelbacken.

Svante Thuresson recorded the song on his 2011 album Regionala nyheter: Stockholmsdelen.
