= Kristina Adolphson =

Swedish actress (born 1937)

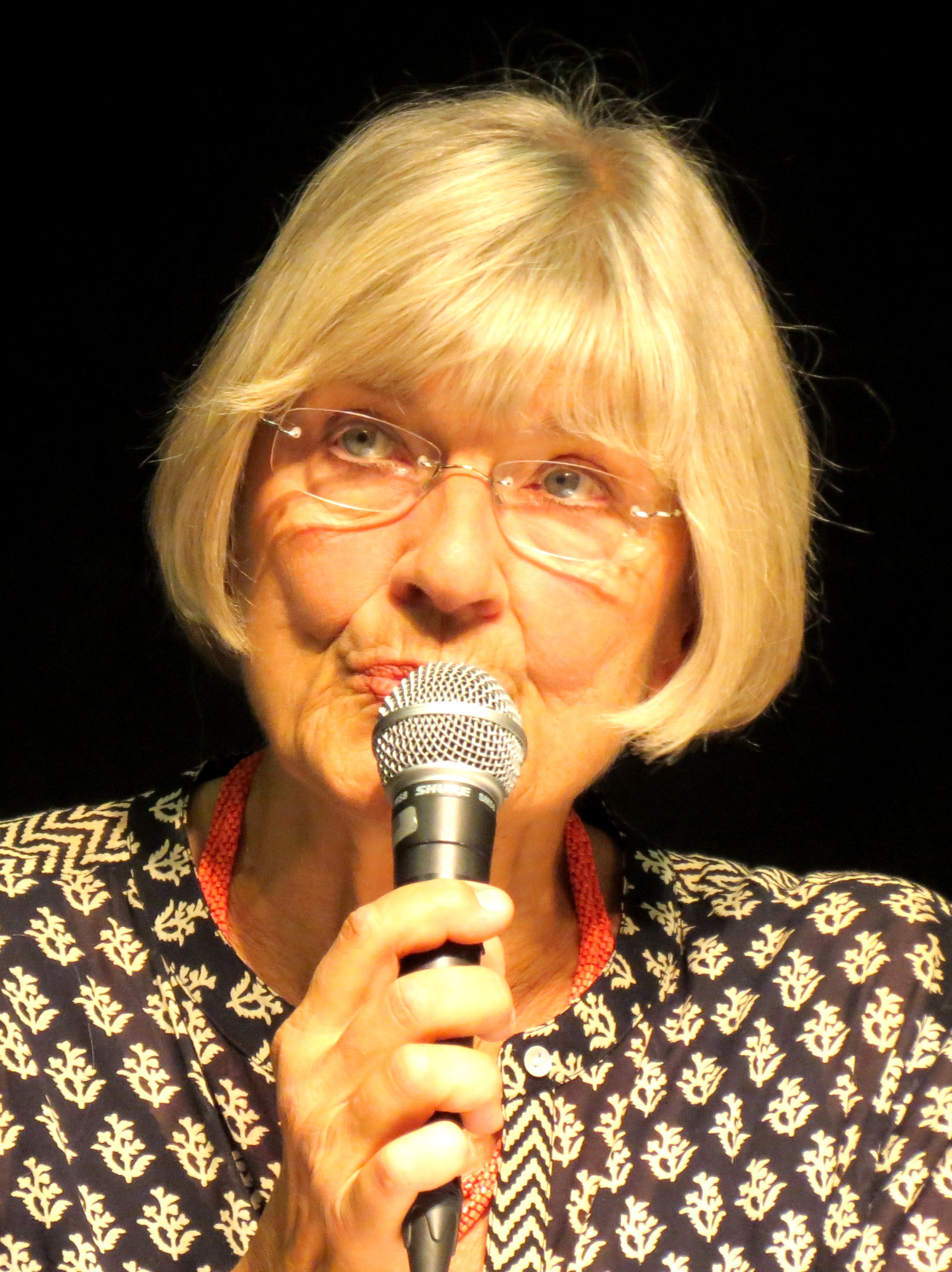
- Kristina Adolphson (2014)
- Born: 2 September 1937 (age 88); Stockholm, Sweden
- Occupation: Actress
- Years active: 1951–1996
- Spouse: Erland Josephson (1959–1989)
- Parents: Edvin Adolphson (father); Mildred Mehle (mother)
- Relatives: Olle Adolphson

Kristina Adolphson (born 2 September 1937) is a Swedish film actress. She was born in Stockholm, Sweden. She is the daughter of the actor Edvin Adolphson and the actress Mildred Mehle, and the sister of the singer Olle Adolphson. She was married to the actor Erland Josephson.

== Selected filmography ==
- The Beat of Wings in the Night (1953)
- Young Summer (1954)
- The Unicorn (1955)
- The Dance Hall (1955)
- When the Mills are Running (1956)
- Brink of Life (1958)
- The Devil's Eye (1960)
- The Pleasure Garden (1961)
- Face to Face (1976)
- Marmalade Revolution (1980)
- Fanny and Alexander (1982)
- Private Confessions (1996)
