= Denmark in the Eurovision Song Contest 2004 =

- Eurovision Song Contest 2004
- Participating broadcaster: Danmarks Radio (DR)
- Country: Denmark
- Selection process: Dansk Melodi Grand Prix 2004
- Selection date: 7 February 2004

Competing entry
- Song: "Shame on You"
- Artist: Tomas Thordarson
- Songwriters: Ivar Lind Greiner; Iben Plesner

Placement
- Semi-final result: Failed to qualify (13th)

Participation chronology

Denmark was represented at the Eurovision Song Contest 2004 with the song "Shame on You". written by Ivar Lind Greiner and Iben Plesner, and performed by Tomas Thordarson. The Danish participating broadcaster, Danmarks Radio (DR), organised the national final Dansk Melodi Grand Prix 2004 in order to select its entry for the contest. The broadcaster returned to the contest after a one-year absence following their relegation from 2003 as one of the bottom five entrants in 2002. Ten songs competed in a televised show where "Sig det' løgn" performed by Tomas Thordarson was the winner as decided upon through two rounds of public voting. The song was later translated from Danish to English for Eurovision and was titled "Shame on You".

Denmark competed in the semi-final of the Eurovision Song Contest which took place on 12 May 2004. Performing during the show in position 19, "Shame on You" was not announced among the top 10 entries of the semi-final and therefore did not qualify to compete in the final. It was later revealed that Denmark placed thirteenth out of the 22 participating countries in the semi-final with 56 points.

== Background ==
Prior to the 2004 contest, Danmarks Radio (DR) had participated in the Eurovision Song Contest representing Denmark thirty-two times since its first entry in 1957. It had won the contest, to this point, on two occasions: in 1963 with the song "Dansevise" performed by Grethe and Jørgen Ingmann, and in 2000 with the song "Fly on the Wings of Love" performed by Olsen Brothers. In 2002, it finished in twenty-fourth (last) place with the song "Tell Me Who You Are" performed by Malene Mortensen.

As part of its duties as participating broadcaster, DR organises the selection of its entry in the Eurovision Song Contest and broadcasts the event in the country. The broadcaster confirmed its intentions to participate at the 2004 contest on 27 August 2003. DR has selected all of its Eurovision entries through the national final Dansk Melodi Grand Prix. Along with its participation confirmation, the broadcaster announced that Dansk Melodi Grand Prix 2004 would be organised in order to select its entry for the 2004 contest.

== Before Eurovision ==
=== Dansk Melodi Grand Prix 2004 ===
Dansk Melodi Grand Prix 2004 was the 34th edition of Dansk Melodi Grand Prix, the music competition organised by DR to select its entries for the Eurovision Song Contest. The event was held on 7 February 2004 at the Atletion in Aarhus, hosted by Natasja Crone and Peter Mygind and televised on DR1. The national final was watched by 1.779 million viewers in Denmark.

==== Competing entries ====
DR opened a submission period between 1 October 2003 and 3 November 2003 for composers to submit their entries. All composers and lyricists were required to be Danish citizens or have Danish residency, while all songs were required to be performed in Danish. The broadcaster received 315 entries during the submission period. A seven-member selection committee selected ten songs from the entries submitted to the broadcaster, while the artists of the selected entries were chosen by DR in consultation with their composers. The competing songs were announced on 22 December 2003 with their artists being announced on 8 January 2004. Among the artists was Helge Engelbrecht (member of Neighbours) who represented Denmark in 1987 as part of Bandjo.

Artist	Song	Songwriter(s)
Claes Wegener	"For jeg kan li' dig"	Misha Popovic, Nanna Kalinka Bjerke
Ditlev Ulriksen	"Hvor end du går hen"	Søren Poppe
Jan Klausen	"Stjerner blinker i dit navn"	Jan Klausen
Kaare Thøgersen	"Lykkelig i nat"	Mette Mathiesen
Mathias Kryger	"Lonnie, kom nu hjem"	Henrik Askou, Regin Fuhlendorf
Nanna Larsen	"Kys mig en gang til"	Nanna Larsen
Neighbours	"Solens sang"	Helge Engelbrecht
Petsi Tvørfoss	"Mest når det er regn"	Niels Drevsholt
Tomas Thordarson	"Sig det' løgn"	Ivar Lind Greiner
Zididada	"Prinsesse"	Jimmy Colding, Danny Linde

==== Final ====
The final took place on 7 February 2004 where the winner was determined over two rounds of public voting. In the first round of voting the top five advanced to the superfinal. In the superfinal, the winner, "Sig det' løgn" performed by Tomas Thordarson, was selected. Viewers were able to vote via telephone or SMS and the telephone voting results of each of Denmark's four regions as well as the SMS voting results in the superfinal were converted to points which were each distributed as follows: 4, 6, 8, 10 and 12 points.

Final – 7 February 2004
R/O	Artist	Song	Result
1	Kaare Thøgersen	"Lykkelig i nat"	—N/a
2	Neighbours	"Solens sang"	Advanced
3	Petsi Tvørfoss	"Mest når det er regn"	Advanced
4	Mathias Kryger	"Lonnie, kom nu hjem"	—N/a
5	Claes Wegener	"For jeg kan li' dig"	—N/a
6	Jan Klausen	"Stjerner blinker i dit navn"	—N/a
7	Zididada	"Prinsesse"	Advanced
8	Nanna Larsen	"Kys mig en gang til"	—N/a
9	Ditlev Ulriksen	"Hvor end du går hen"	Advanced
10	Tomas Thordarson	"Sig det' løgn"	Advanced

Superfinal – 7 February 2004
R/O	Artist	Song	Televoting Regions				SMS	Total	Place
R/O	Artist	Song	Jutland	Funen	Zealand and Islands	Capital Region	SMS	Total	Place
1	Neighbours	"Solens sang"	10	8	6	8	8	40	3
2	Petsi Tvørfoss	"Mest når det er regn"	4	4	10	4	4	26	5
3	Zididada	"Prinsesse"	8	10	8	10	10	46	2
4	Ditlev Ulriksen	"Hvor end du går hen"	6	6	4	6	6	28	4
5	Tomas Thordarson	"Sig det' løgn"	12	12	12	12	12	60	1

== At Eurovision ==
It was announced that the competition's format would be expanded to include a semi-final in 2004. According to the rules, all nations with the exceptions of the host country, the "Big Four" (France, Germany, Spain and the United Kingdom), and the ten highest placed finishers in the 2003 contest are required to qualify from the semi-final on 12 May 2004 in order to compete for the final on 15 May 2004; the top ten countries from the semi-final progress to the final. On 23 March 2004, an allocation draw was held which determined the running order for the semi-final and Denmark was set to perform in position 19, following the entry from Croatia and before the entry from Serbia and Montenegro. Tomas Thordarson performed the English version of "Sig det' løgn" at the contest, titled "Shame on You". At the end of the semi-final, Denmark was not announced among the top 10 entries and therefore failed to qualify to compete in the final. It was later revealed that Denmark placed thirteenth in the semi-final, receiving a total of 56 points.

The semi-final and final were broadcast on DR1 with commentary by Jørgen de Mylius. DR appointed Camilla Ottesen as its spokesperson to announce the Danish votes during the final.

=== Voting ===
Below is a breakdown of points awarded to Denmark and awarded by Denmark in the semi-final and grand final of the contest. The nation awarded its 12 points to Bosnia and Herzegovina in the semi-final and to Sweden in the final of the contest.

Following the release of the televoting figures by the EBU after the conclusion of the competition, it was revealed that a total of 194,796 televotes were cast in Denmark during the two shows: 58,027 votes during the semi-final and 136,769 votes during the final.

==== Points awarded to Denmark ====
Points awarded to Denmark (Semi-final)
Score	Country
12 points	Iceland
10 points	Monaco
8 points	
7 points	
6 points	Norway
5 points	Israel; Sweden
4 points	Finland
3 points	Bosnia and Herzegovina; Cyprus; Estonia
2 points	Malta; Romania
1 point	Turkey

==== Points awarded by Denmark ====
Points awarded by Denmark (Semi-final)
Score	Country
12 points	Bosnia and Herzegovina
10 points	Serbia and Montenegro
8 points	Netherlands
7 points	Albania
6 points	Ukraine
5 points	Cyprus
4 points	Malta
3 points	Greece
2 points	Israel
1 point	Macedonia

Points awarded by Denmark (Final)
Score	Country
12 points	Sweden
10 points	Turkey
8 points	Bosnia and Herzegovina
7 points	Serbia and Montenegro
6 points	Cyprus
5 points	Ukraine
4 points	Albania
3 points	Greece
2 points	Iceland
1 point	Malta
