= Paradise (E-Type & Nana Hedin song) =

Single by E-Type & Nana Hedin

from the album Loud Pipes Save Lives
- Released: 2004
- Genre: Eurodance
- Label: Stockholm
- Songwriters: E-Type; Mud
- Producers: Max Martin; Rami Yacoub; John Amatiello; Christian Nilsson

"Paradise" is a song written by E-Type and Mud and performed by E-Type with Nana Hedin during Melodifestivalen 2004. Participating in the second semifinal in Gothenburg, it made it to the finals inside the Stockholm Globe Arena, where it ended up 5th.

Released as a single, it also appeared on the album Loud Pipes Save Lives. It peaked at 2nd position at the Swedish singles chart.

It also charted at Svensktoppen, for three weeks between 11 April 2004 and 25 April 2004, peaking at 5th position before leaving the chart.

During Melodifestivalen, Motörhead's drummer Mikkey Dee appeared with E-Type. He also appears in the song video.

== Music video ==
The music video begins with a family celebrating studenten - Swedish high school graduation. The graduate, studentmössa in hand, is called out to the dinner table by her mother. Once everyone is sitting down, E-Type draws everyone's attention by first strumming his guitar and then addressing everyone at the table with the opening lyrics. The graduate, initially embarrassed by the scene, starts daydreaming during the lengthy speech and begins to fantasize about being in paradise, which is essentially an E-Type concert with her partying to the music with her friends and along with almost everybody seated at the table as well. The music video has over 1 million views on YouTube as of September 2021.

== Chart position ==
Chart (2004)	Peak position
Finland	11
Norway	11
Sweden	2
