= Stockholms ström (song) =

Song by Aston Reymers Rivaler

from the album Kräål
- Language: Swedish
- Released: 1980
- Label: Musiklagret
- Songwriter: Magnus Lindh

Stockholms ström is a song written by Magnus Lindh, and originally recorded by Aston Reymers Rivaler on the 1980 album Kräål as well as appearing on the 1981 album Finaste blandning.

The song charted at Svensktoppen for seven weeks between 18 January-1 March 1981, peaking at eight position.

In 2004, the song was recorded by Gösta Engström on the album Gösta Engström & Kavringarna på S/S Saltsjön. In 2010, it was recorded by Rigo & the Topaz Sound.

The song lyrics arguing for no watercourse in the world compares to Stockholms ström.
