= After Dark (drag act) =

Swedish drag act

After Dark (1976–2018) was a Swedish drag act starring entertainer Christer Lindarw who eventually also began appearing intermittently out of drag and singing with his own voice.

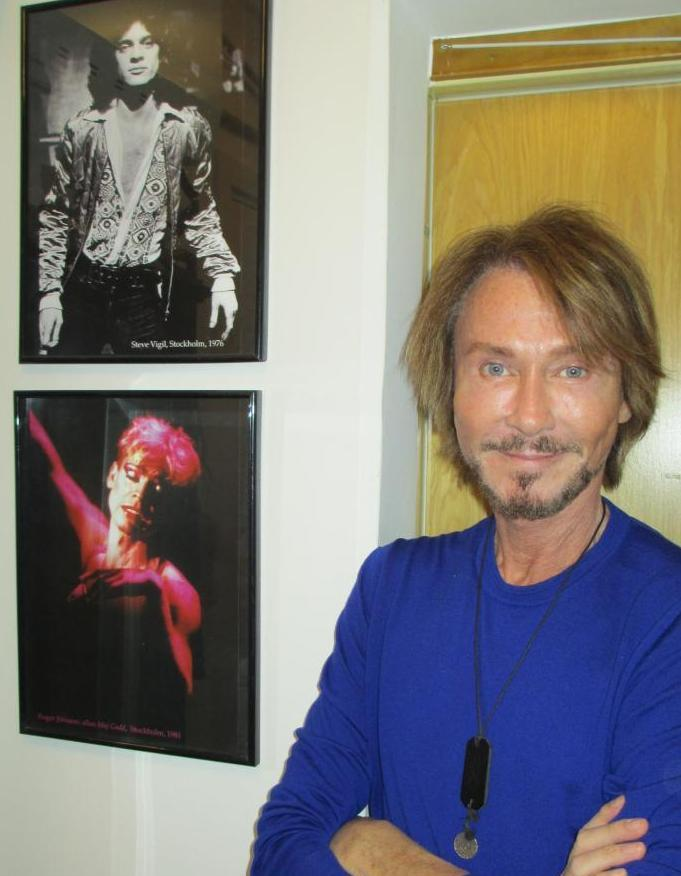
Lindarw in 2015 next to a portrait (lower) of the late co-founder Jönsson

== Show history ==
The group was put together for a special Stockholm nightclub called After Dark Club immediately after Lindarw with Roger Jönsson had appeared in Wild Side Story at Alexandra's in January 1976 and also in February, with an added co-star Lars "Lasse" Flinckman. Its immediate appeal with Alexandra's clientele has been cited as instrumental to rapid and early success. Since that time, After Dark has been a major ingredient in Swedish LGBT culture. Jönsson however left the group for another in 1981 and died in 1984. The Lindarw-Flinckman duo had international success, performing in Barcelona, Madrid and San Francisco.

By 2009 Flinckman had retired from the show (he died in 2016) and was replaced for a tour of Sweden by entertainer Lars-Åke Wilhelmsson also known as Babsan. Their Stockholm version of the show was broadcast by TV4 on New Year's Eve 2011. Dancer Nils-Albert Eriksson remained in the ensemble since its start in 1976 doing male parts.

Late in 2016, as his comprehensive biography was published by Bonniers, Lindarw starring alone began his last big show tour, to be completed at Oscarsteatern in Stockholm during the last few months of 2017, and he then revealed that After Dark would be discontinued after that.

== Eurovision Song Contest attempts ==
In 2004 After Dark competed in Melodifestivalen, the annual Swedish preparation for the Eurovision Song Contest. Their song La dolce vita finished third domestically and did not proceed. A single of the song was a hit on the radio in Sweden and was often played at Swedish day care centers. After Dark did a new show that year, named for the song, at Stockholm's main amusement park.

In a fourth and final televised Melodifestivalen trial in February 2007 After Dark, without Flinckman, did (Åh) När ni tar saken i egna händer, which competed well but did not proceed to the domestic finale. The Swedish lyrics related humorously to masturbation using puns.

After Dark was in Melodifestivalen 2016 again with the song "Kom ut som en stjärna" and finished in 7th place in the third semifinal.

== Singles ==
Title	Year	Peak chart positions	Certifications	Album
Title	Year	SWE	Certifications	Album
"La dolce vita"	2004	8	GLF: Gold	Non-album singles
"Det är då jag älskar dig"	2004	38		Non-album singles
"Kom ut"	2006	4		Non-album singles
"(Åh) När ni tar saken i egna händer"	2007	15		Non-album singles
"Kom ut som en stjärna"	2016	86		Non-album singles

== See also ==
- List of drag groups
