= Sara Löfgren =

Swedish singer

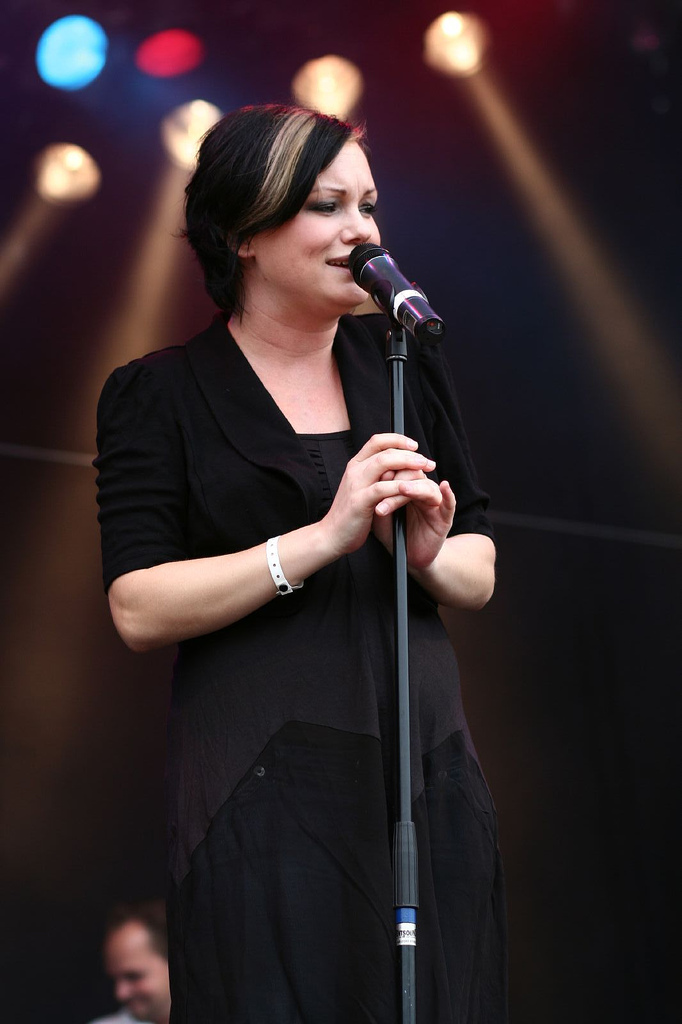
- Sara Löfgren during the Stockholm Pride Festival in August 2007

Background information
- Born: 11 April 1977 (age 48)
- Origin: Sweden
- Genres: Soul, Pop, Gothic metal
- Occupations: Singer-songwriter
- Instruments: Vocals

Sara Therese Löfgren (born 11 April 1977) is a Swedish singer known for her participation in Fame Factory and her song "Starkare" (Stronger).

== Background ==
Löfgren started singing at the age of 12. She got a break in the talent show Fame Factory which was broadcast on TV3, performing songs like "Starkare", and "Aldrig". She participated in Melodifestivalen 2004 performing "Som stormen", which finished 7th. In 2004, she was also nominated in two categories at the Nordic Music Award". Her debut album "Starkare" sold over 60,000 copies.

She was a member of the gothic metal band Those We Don't Speak Of, later leaving the band due to pregnancy.

By 2017, Sara Löfgren had put her career as an artist on hold. She was working as a recreational leader in Varberg, Sweden.

== Discography ==
=== Album ===
- 2004: Starkare
- 2009: Där maskrosorna blommar

=== Singles ===
- 2003: Starkare
- 2004: För alltid
- 2004: Som stormen
- 2004: Lite kär
- 2005: Fastän regnet öser ned
- 2006: Vägen hem
- 2009: Glöd
- 2009: Maskrosor

=== Cooperation with other artists ===
- 2008: Still looking for you (med Sulo)
