= Som stormen =

Single by Sara Löfgren
- A-side: "Som stormen"
- B-side: "Som stormen" (summertime mix)
- Released: 2004
- Genre: pop
- Label: M&L Records
- Songwriters: Lars Diedricson; Carina Bergsman Danielsson; Eddie Jonsson

Sara Löfgren singles chronology
"För alltid" (2004)	"Som stormen" (2004)	"Lite kär" (2004)

"Som stormen" is a song written by Lars Diedricson, Carina Bergsman Danielsson and Eddie Jonsson, and performed by Sara Löfgren at Melodifestivalen 2004. Participating at the first deltog semifinal in Karlstad on 21 February 2004, it went directly to the finals in Stockholm, where it ended up 7th.

The single, released the same year, peaked at 16th position at the Swedish singles chart. The song also charted at Svensktoppen for three weeks between 16-30 May 2004.

== Charts ==
Chart (2004)	Peak position
Sweden (Sverigetopplistan)	16
