= Vindarna vänder oss =

Single by Fame
- A-side: "Vindarna vänder oss"
- B-side: "The Wind Has Turned Around" ("Vindarna vänder oss")
- Released: March 2004
- Genre: pop
- Label: Mariann Grammofon
- Songwriters: Henrik Sethson, Pontus Assarsson, Dan Attlerud

Fame singles chronology
"The Way You Love Me" (2004)	"Vindarna vänder oss" (2004)	"Gjorda för varandra" (2005)

Vindarna vänder oss is a song written by Henrik Sethson, Pontus Assarsson and Dan Attlerud, and performed by Fame at Melodifestivalen 2004. The song participated in the third semifinal inside Scandinavium in Gothenburg on 28 February 2004, making it directly to the final, ending up 6th. The song was also released as a single.

The single peaked at 23rd position at the Swedish singles chart. The song also charted at Svensktoppen for one week, ending up 10th on 2 May 2004 before leaving chart.

Fame also recorded the song with lyrics in English, as "The Wind Has Turned Around".

== Charts ==
Chart (2004)	Peak position
Sweden (Sverigetopplistan)	23
