= La dolce vita (After Dark song) =

2004 single by After Dark

Single by After Dark
- A-side: "La dolce vita"
- Released: March 2004
- Genre: Pop, Schlager
- Label: Start klart
- Songwriters: Larry Forsberg, Sven-Inge Sjöberg, Lennart Wastesson

After Dark singles chronology
"La dolce vita" (2004)	"Det är då jag älskar dig" (2004)

Audio
- "La Dolce Vita" on YouTube

"La dolce vita" is a song written by Larry Forsberg, Sven-Inge Sjöberg and Lennard Wastesson, and originally performed by After Dark (Christer Lindarw and Lasse Flinckman) at Melodifestivalen 2004, where the song competed in the semifinal in Malmö on 13 March 2004, before reaching the final inside the Stockholm Globe Arena, where it ended up third. On stage they wore pink dresses, the same style as Lena Philipsson wore when her song "Det gör ont" won the contest that year.

On the Swedish singles chart, the single peaked at number 8. The song also stayed at Svensktoppen for eleven weeks during the period of 4 April-13 June 2004, topping the chart three times before leaving it.

== Charts ==
Chart (2004)	Peak position
Sweden (Sverigetopplistan)	8
