= Siw Malmkvist =

Swedish schlager singer (born 1936)

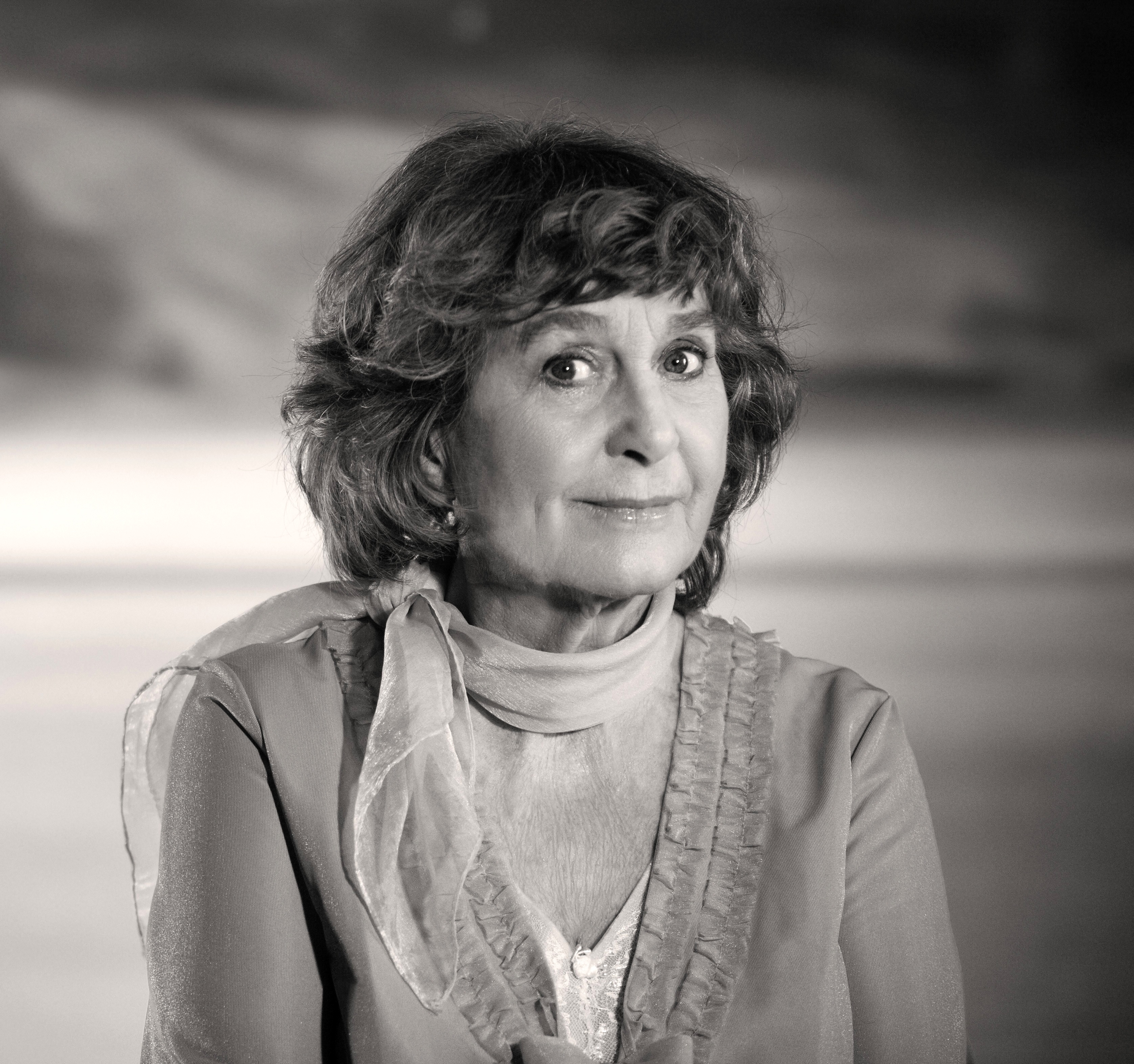
- Siw Malmkvist in 2011

Background information
- Born: Siw Gunnel Margareta Malmkvist; 31 December 1936 (age 89); Landskrona, Sweden
- Occupations: Singer; actress
- Years active: 1957–present
- Musical career
- Genre: Schlager
- Instrument: Vocals

Siw Gunnel Margareta Malmkvist (born 31 December 1936) is a Swedish schlager singer and actress popular in Scandinavia and West Germany (today's Germany). She represented Sweden in the Eurovision Song Contest 1960 and West Germany in the Eurovision Song Contest 1969.

She had a number one hit in West Germany in 1964 with "Liebeskummer lohnt sich nicht" ("Lovesickness Is Not Worthwhile"), and on 18 July 1964 she became the first Swede to have a hit on the US Billboard Hot 100 chart, when "Sole Sole Sole", a duet with Italian singer Umberto Marcato, entered the chart, peaking at No. 58. Malmkvist is notable for having recorded in more than 10 languages, including Swedish, English, Finnish, Norwegian, Danish, Dutch, French, Italian, Spanish and particularly German.

== Early life ==
Siw Malmkvist grew up in Landskrona as one of nine siblings. She is the daughter of Albert Malmkvist (1901–1979) and Sigrid Lind (1899–1988), as well as the older sister of singer Lil Malmkvist and aunt to Morgan Alling.

Her career started when she participated in orchestras in Skåne. In 1955 she participated in a singing competition, which defined her career. She won the first round of competition locally in Skåne, and got to travel to Stockholm Concert Hall, where the grand final took place. She won the final, receiving a clock as an award, and recorded her first grammophone record, called Tweedle Dee. Malmkvist had also worked as an invoice clerk in Landskrona.

== Career ==
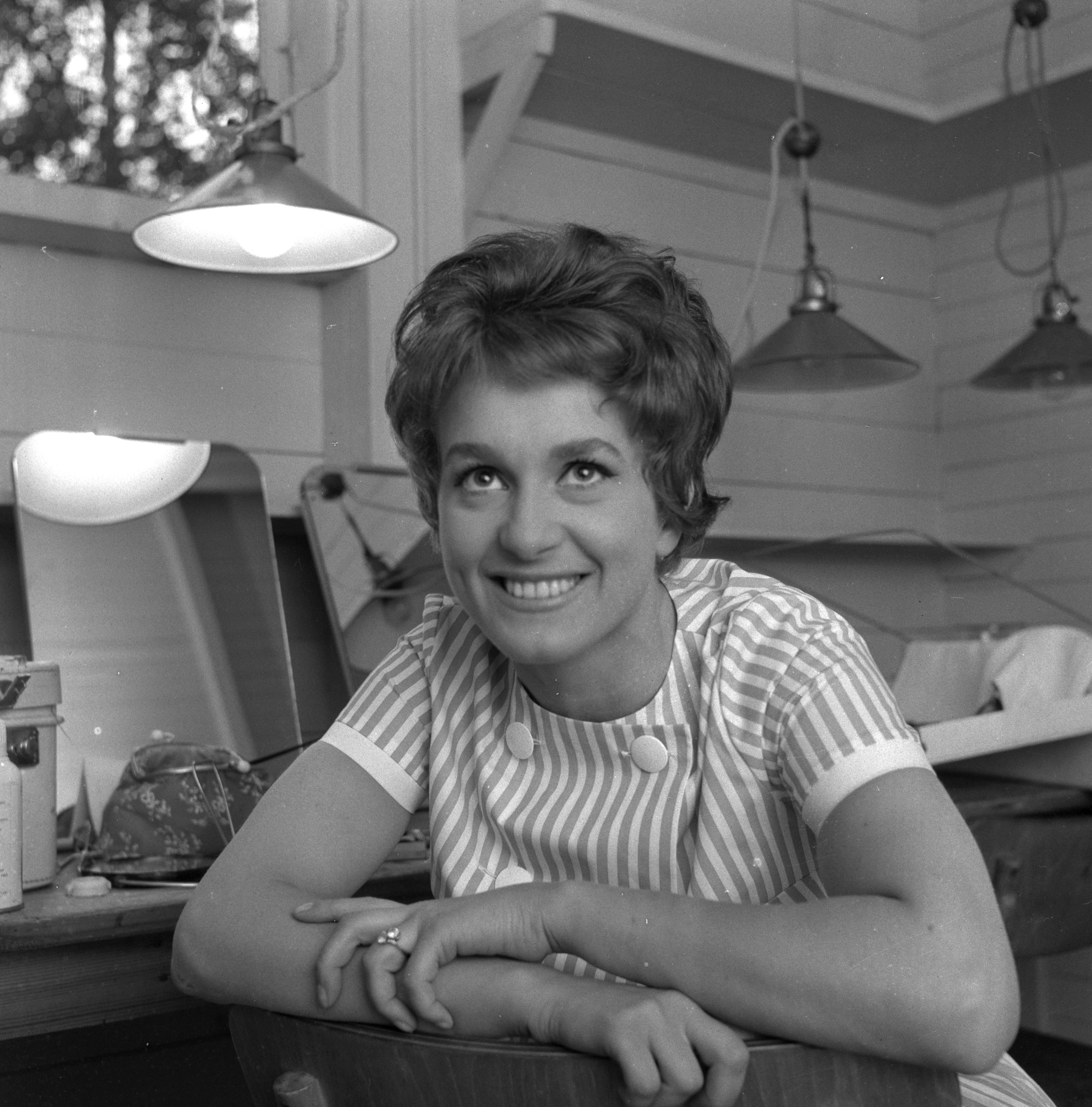
Siw Malmkvist 13 June 1959

Her breakthrough came in 1959 when she was a hostess on Lennart Hyland's television show Stora famnen. The same year, she won Melodifestivalen with the song "Augustin", but did not get to represent Sweden in Eurovision Song Contest, as Brita Borg was internally selected to sing the song in Cannes. With the song "Augustin", Malmkvist got her first hit song. It went on to place fourth on Show-Business magazine's bestseller list on 1 March 1959, and sold over 60,000 copies. One year later, Malmkvist would represen Sweden in the Eurovision Song Contest 1960 in London with the song "Alla andra får varann", where she ended up placing tenth. In the Swedish Melodifestivalen the same year, Inger Berggren and Östen Warnerbring had won with the same song song, but Malmkvist had been internally selected for Eurovision. Malmkvist again won Melodifestivalen in 1961, with the song "April, April", but again, SVT internally selected another singer to perform it in Eurovision, this time Lill-Babs.

In 1959, she launched her career in West Germany, where she became very popular. In 1961, she had a hit song with the song "Danke für die Blumen". In 1960, she released the song "Die Liebe ist ein seltsames Spiel" under the pseudonym "Die Jolly Sisters". Later, she would release the song in Sweden as well with the title "Tunna skivor", which became a hit, topping the chart for seven weeks and selling over 97,000 copies. Her next song, "Läs inte brevet jag skrev dej", sold over 80,000 copies. From 1963 onward, she lived in Helsinki, Finland, with her husband Lasse Mårtenson and their daughter. During this time in 1964, she became the first Swedish singer to place on the Billboard hit list. Along with Umberto Marcato, she sang the song "Sole Sole Sole" in Italian and peaked at number 58 for five weeks.

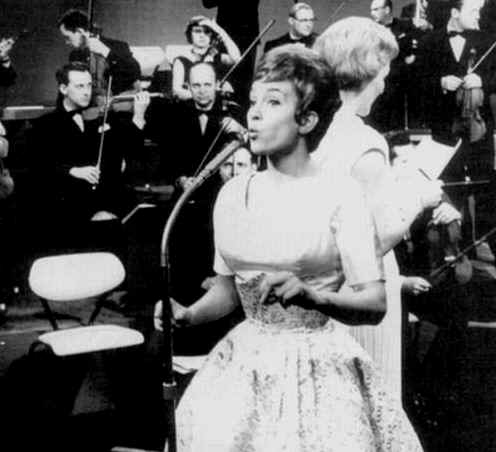
Siw Malmkvist in Melodifestivalen 1961 with "April April"

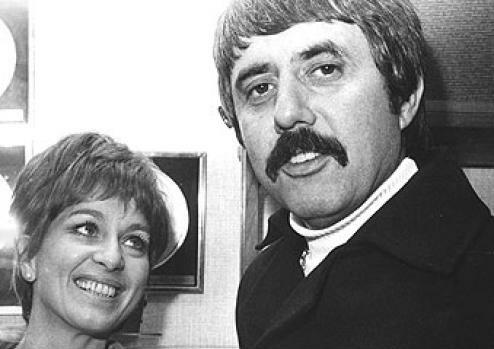
Siw Malmkvist and Lee Hazlewood 1968

Malmkvist had success in the singing competition Schlager-Festspiele in Baden-Baden. At the debut in 1962, she placed second with "Die Wege der Liebe". In 1964, she won the competition with "Liebeskummer lohnt sich nicht", which sold 1,000,000 copies and peaked at number one on the West Germany chart for ten weeks, In Swedish, the song was named "Kärleksgrubbel". In 1968, she won the competition once again with the song "Harlekin". In 1969, she won the West German selection for the Eurovision Song Contest the same year with the song "Primaballerina", placing seventh in Madrid. To this day, Malmkvist's songs remain popular in Germany. In Melodifestivalen 1988, she participated with the song "Det är kärlek".

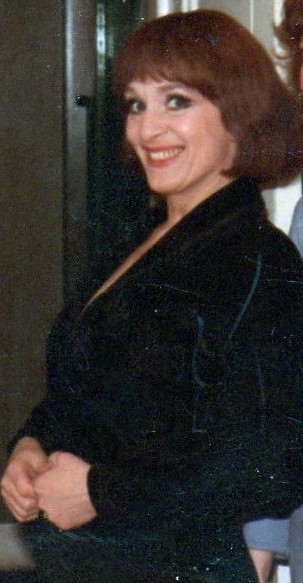
Siw Malmkvist at Oscarsteatern, 1983

Malmkvist had an acting career in Denmark as well as Sweden. Amongst other roles she played the leading role in the film Forelsket i København (1960) and as Eivor in Varning för Jönssonligan (1981). She soon also showed talent on stage; she had the leading role in the musical Irma la douce. She also participated in the Kar de Mumma-revue at Folkan in 1972, and in the Karl Gerhard show Hej på dig du gamla primadonna at Vasateatern. In 1980, she played the role of Pippi Longstocking in a play at Folkan in Stockholm. She received acclaim for her role as Luise in the musical Nine at Oscarsteatern 1983–84, where she acted against Ernst-Hugo Järegård. In later years, Malmkvist has acted in the musical I hetaste laget at Nöjesteatern in Malmö. In 2008, she played Fräulein Schneide in Colin Nutley's version of the musical Cabaret at Stockholms stadsteater.

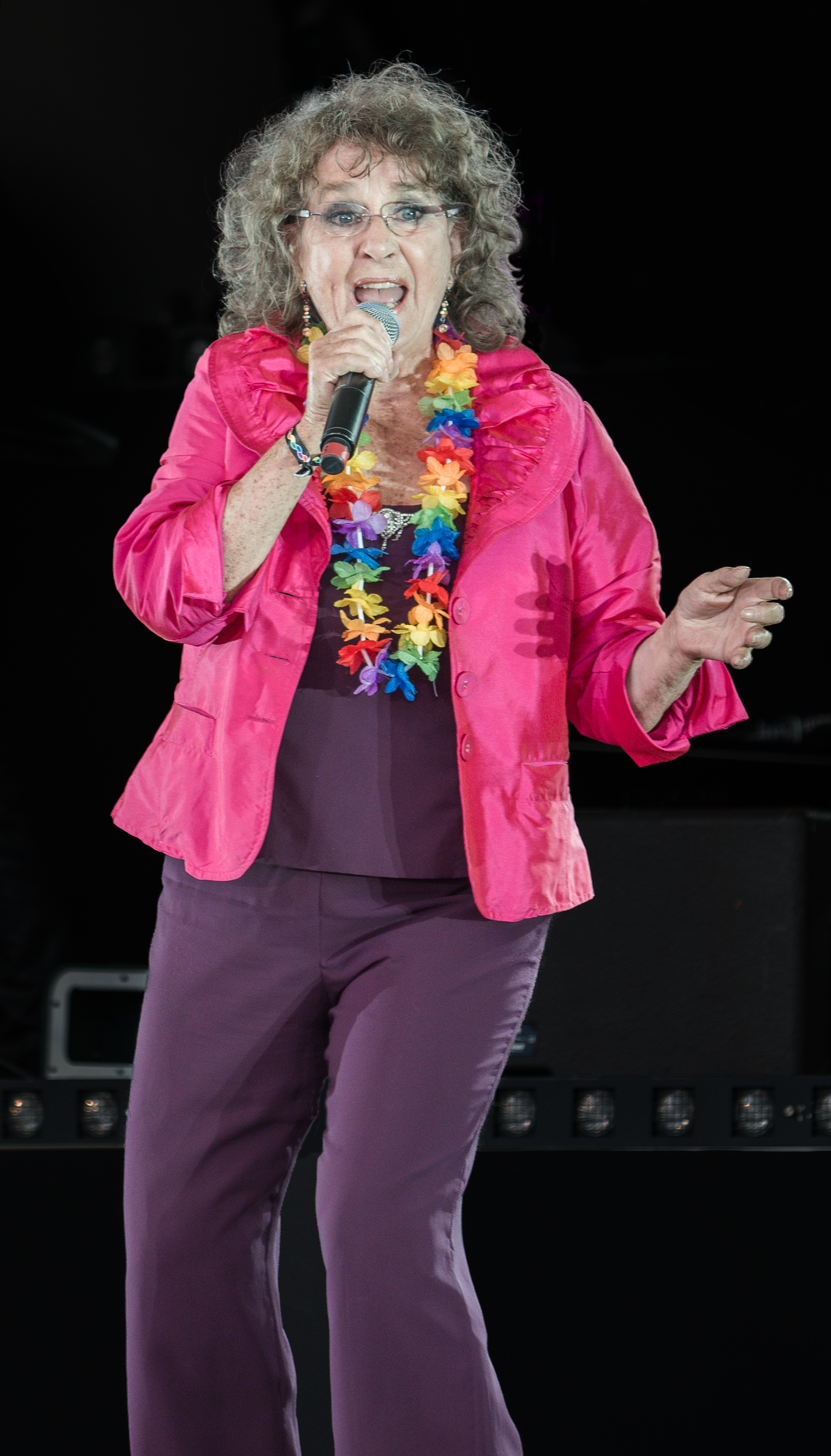
Siw Malmkvist at Stockholm Pride 2014

In later years she has done many shows, including on Hamburger Börs in Stockholm, along with Lill-Babs and Wenche Myhre. She participated in Melodifestivalen 2004 with the song "C'est la vie" along with Towa Carson and Ann-Louise Hanson. The trio went on to sing at Allsång på Skansen, which is broadcast on SVT. Between 2003 and 2012, Malmkvist participated in the Arlövs revue show every year. In 2003 and 2004, she took part in the Diggiloo summer tour. On 2 June 2004, Malmkvist, along with Wenche Myhre and Gitte Henning, debuted their show Gitte Wenche Siw – Die Show, in Germany, Austria and Switzerland. The tour continued until June 2008 in Kiel, with a total of 350 shows. Together with actor Thorsten Flinck, she recorded a Swedish cover of Nick Cave/Kylie Minogue's 1995 hit "Where the Wild Roses Grow", called "Vildvuxna rosor". In 2005, Malmkvist participated in the TV4 show Körslaget, where she was eliminated first on 5 April.

In 2009, she was a celebrity guest on SVT1's Stjärnorna på slottet, where she discussed her life and career. Between 2010 and 2011, Malmkvist, along with Lill-Babs and Ann-Louise Hanson, had a show called Tre damer. In 2010, Malmkvist published her memoirs, named Tunna skivor av mig.

In 2011, she performed at Allsång på Skansen performing a medley of her hits. In 2012, she participated on the SVT show Vem tror du att du är?, the Swedish version of Who Do You Think You Are?. On the show, she was told her ancestors were soldiers at the Battle at Poltava and that she had Snapphanar amongst her relatives.

Malmkvist signed on to be a celebrity dancer on Let's Dance 2020, which is broadcast on TV4. However, on 17 March it was revealed that she would not participate because of restrictions concerning the COVID-19 virus.

In 2021, she took part in two episodes of the TV4 show Så mycket bättre.

In 2023, Malmkvist was a guest celebrity judge on the episode "MARATHON Talent Hunt" of the Swedish-language reality television series Drag Race Sverige broadcast on SVT1 and SVT Play.

In 2025, the documentary film Filmen om Siw ('The film about Siw') premiered in Swedish cinemas. In December of that year, SVT broadcast a three-part documentary series on Malmkvist's life and career, called Siw.

On 24 December 2025, Malmkvist was the julvärd ('Christmas host'), the presenter for SVT's Christmas Eve broadcasts.

== Personal life ==
Malmkvist was married to Finnish-Swedish musician Lasse Mårtenson from 1963 to 1969, and the couple have one daughter. Malmkvist was in a relationship with actor Fredrik Ohlsson from 1971 until his death in 2023; the couple have a son together born in 1973.

== Discography ==
=== Albums ===
Year	Title	Peak chart positions	
Year	Title	SWE	GER
1958	Siw Malmkvist	—	—
1960	Förälskad I Köpenhamn (with Henning Moritzen)	—	—
1961	Siw	—	—
1967	Doctor Dolittle (with Per Myrberg, Svante Thuresson and Fred Åkerström)	—	—
1968	Nu!	—	—
1969	Today	—	—
1970	Underbara Siw	—	—
1971	Mycket Siw Och Lite Dragspel	—	—
1972	Har'u Vart På Cirkus (With Tove Mårtenson)	—	—
1974	Ragtime	—	—
1976	Explosiw	38	—
1980	Pippi På Folkan	—	—
1984	Med Lånade Låtar Och Vänner Till Hjälp (with Hasse Andersson, Kvinnaböske Band and Peps Persson)	—	—
1985	Alla Tiders Siw	—	—
1988	Det Är Kärlek	—	—
1994	Danke Für Die Blumen	—	—
1998	Musik Ist Wie Ein Freund	—	—
2005	Gitte Wencke Siw - Die Show (with Gitte Hænning and Wencke Myhre)	—	100
2010	Tunna Skivor Av Mig	—	—

=== EPs ===
Year	Title	Peak chart positions	Album
Year	Title	SWE Kvällstoppen	Album
1956	Walt Disney’s Lady och Lufsen (with Staffan Broms)	—	Non-album singles
1957	En hemvävd stillsam tös	—	Non-album singles
1958	Mister Wonderful	—	
1958	Den som glad är	—	
1958	Alle Elsker	—	
1959	Bubbel	—	
1959	You Can't Get To Heaven On Roller Skates	—	
1959	Augustin (with Lilian Malmkvist)	—	
1959	Kärleksgasen	—	
1959	Bella Danica	—	
1959	Jazz Bacillen	—	
1959	Miss 100.000 Volts	—	
1960	Flickor Bak I Bilen	—	
1960	Tunna skivor	—	
1960	Förälskad i Köpenhamn (Vol. 1) (with Henning Moritzen)	—	
1960	Förälskad i Köpenhamn (Vol. 2) (with Henning Moritzen)	—	
1960	Miss 500.000 Volts	—	
1961	April April	—	
1961	Du förstår ingenting	—	
1961	Du har bara lekt med mej	—	
1961	Läs inte brevet jag skrev dej	—	
1962	Music, Music, Music	—	
1962	Tänk Så Härligt	—	
1963	Gulle Dej (with The Popcorns)	7	
1963	Skona mitt hjärta	—	
1964	För sent skall syndarn vakna	—	
1964	Amore, Scusami	—	
1965	Tror du att jag förlorad är	—	
1965	Siw Malmkvist Für Kenner	—	
1966	Bergsprängartango	—	
1966	Slit & Släng	6	
1967	Sprattelgumma	—	

=== Singles ===
==== 1950s ====
Year	Title	Peak chart positions	Album
Year	Title	GER	Album
1955	"Tweedlee Dee"	—	Non-album single
1955	"Bambino" (with Jørgen Ingmann)	—	Siw Malmkvist
1955	"Freddy"	—	Non-album single
1956	"Cha-Cha-Cha"	—	Non-album single
1956	"Titta på varandra"	—	Non-album single
1956	"Tiritomba"	—	Non-album single
1957	"Två små fåglar på en gren"	—	Non-album single
1957	"Tammy"	—	Non-album single
1958	"Mister Wonderful"	—	Siw Malmkvist
1958	"Den Som Glad Är"	—	Non-album single
1959	"Jazz Bacillen" / "The Preacher"	—	Non-album single
1959	"Sermonette"	—	Non-album single
1959	"You Can't Get To Heaven On Roller Skates"	—	Siw Malmkvist
1959	"Augustin"	—	Siw Malmkvist
1959	"Sju vackra gossar"	—	Non-album single
1959	"Cocktail Tango" (with Lilian Malmkvist)	—	Siw Malmkvist
1959	"Hundertmal"	—	Non-album single
1959	"Schotten-Rock"	—	Non-album single
1959	"Träume Sind Wie Der Wind"	—	Non-album single
1959	"September Im Regen"	—	Non-album single
1959	"Sig de skøreste ting"	—	Non-album single
1959	"Buon Giorno, Amore" (with The Delta Rhythm Boys)	—	Non-album single
1959	"Syv flotte fyre" (Note: Released in Denmark only.)	—	Non-album single
1959	"Mon du elsker mig stadig klaus jørgen"	—	Non-album single
1959	"Den nye fuglesangen"	—	Siw Malmkvist
1959	"Liefdesdrank"	—	Non-album single
1959	"So Soviel Liebe"	47	Non-album single
"—" denotes the single failed to chart or was not released.

==== 1960s ====
Year	Title	Peak chart positions										Album
Year	Title	SWE Kvällstoppen	SWE Svensktoppen	SWE Tio i topp	AUT	BEL	GER	FIN	NET	NOR	US	Album
1960	"Flickor bak i bilen"	—	—	—	—	—	—	—	—	—	—	Non-album single
1960	"Tunna skivor"	—	—	—	—	—	—	—	—	—	—	Non-album single
1960	"Bare minner tilbake jag har"	—	—	—	—	—	—	—	—	—	—	Non-album single
1960	"Förälskad i Köpenhamn"	—	—	—	—	—	—	—	—	—	—	Förälskad I Köpenhamn
1960	"Skeed Lee Bee"	—	—	—	—	—	—	—	—	—	—	Förälskad I Köpenhamn
1960	"Melody For Two" (with Henning Moritzen)	—	—	—	—	—	—	—	—	—	—	Förälskad I Köpenhamn
1960	"Den Kolde Skulder"	—	—	—	—	—	—	—	—	—	—	
1960	"Trocadero 9910"	—	—	—	—	—	50	—	—	—	—	
1960	"Lieber Jonny, Komm' Doch Wieder"	—	—	—	—	—	—	—	—	—	—	
1960	"So Wie Es Damals War"	—	—	—	—	—	—	—	—	—	—	
1960	"Buon Giorno Amore"	—	—	—	—	—	—	—	—	—	—	
1961	"April April"	—	—	—	—	—	—	—	—	—	—	
1961	"Wedding Cake" / "Danke Für Die Blumen" (German version)	—	—	—	—	—	4	—	—	—	—	
1961	"Du har bara lekt med mej"	—	—	10	—	—	—	—	—	—	—	Siw
1961	"För kärleks skull"	—	—	—	—	—	—	—	—	—	—	Siw
1961	"Bortom Bergen"	—	—	— (Note: Utslagen)	—	—	—	—	—	—	—	
1961	"Schade, Schade, Schade"	—	—	—	—	—	—	—	—	—	—	
1961	"Tosse rundt"	—	—	—	—	—	—	—	—	—	—	
1961	"Læs ikke brevet jeg skrev dig"	—	—	— (Note: Utslagen)	—	—	—	—	—	—	—	
1961	"Der var en gang på trinidad"	—	—	—	—	—	—	—	—	—	—	
1961	"Here Comes The Bride"	—	—	—	—	—	—	—	—	—	—	
1962	"Music, Music, Music" / "Schade, Schade, Schade" (German version)	—	—	— (Note: Utslagen)	—	—	13	—	—	—	—	
1962	"Våran katt" / "Schwarzer Kater Stanislaus" (German version)	—	—	—	—	—	17	—	—	—	—	Tänk Så Härligt EP
1962	"När Det Blåser På Månen"	—	9	—	—	—	—	—	—	—	—	Tänk Så Härligt EP
1962	"Die Wege Der Liebe"	—	—	—	—	—	19	—	—	—	—	
1962	"Jimmy Verzeih' Mir Noch Einmal"	—	—	—	—	—	31	—	—	—	—	
1963	"Happy Oscar"	—	9	—	—	—	—	—	—	—	—	Gulle Dej EP
1963	"Gulle Dej"	—	2	—	—	—	—	—	—	—	—	Gulle Dej EP
1963	"Monsieur"	—	5	—	—	—	—	—	—	—	—	Gulle Dej EP
1963	"Tror Du Att Jag Förlorad Är"	—	10	—	—	—	—	—	—	—	—	
1963	"Brænd mine breve"	—	—	—	—	—	—	—	—	—	—	
1963	"Skona mitt hjärta"	6	2	—	—	—	—	—	—	2	—	
1963	"Mr. Casanova"	—	—	—	—	—	7	—	—	—	—	
1963	"1999"	—	—	—	—	—	8	—	—	—	—	
1964	"Sole Sole Sole" (With Umberto Marcato)	—	3	—	—	—	22	—	—	—	58	
1964	"Før sent skall syndarn vakna"	—	2	—	—	—	—	—	—	—	—	
1964	"Kärleksgrubbel" (Swedish version) / "Liebeskummer Lohnt Sich Nicht" (German version)	—	6	14	—	8	1	—	5	—	—	Siw Malmkvist
1964	"O' Sheriff"	—	—	—	—	—	—	—	—	—	—	
1964	"Kom Hjem Jensen"	—	—	—	—	—	—	—	—	—	—	Non-album single
1965	"Vogt dig når du kysser ham" (Swedish version) / "Küsse nie nach Mitternacht" (German version)	—	—	—	10	—	9	—	39	—	—	
1965	"Amore, Scusami"	13	3	—	—	—	—	—	—	—	—	
1965	"Balladen Om Det Stora Slagsmålet På Tegelbacken" (with Boris & The Beat Dogs)	—	7	—	—	—	—	—	—	—	—	Tror Du Att Jag Förlorad Är EP
1965	"Tror Du Att Jag Förlorad Är" (Note: "Tror Du Att Jag Förlorad Är" re-entered the Svensktoppen chart after the EP consisting the song was released in 1965.)	—	5	—	—	—	—	—	—	—	—	Tror Du Att Jag Förlorad Är EP
1965	"Das Fünfte Rad Am Wagen"	—	—	—	—	—	22	—	—	—	—	
1965	"Sieben Tränen"	—	—	—	—	—	11	—	—	—	—	
1966	"Bergsprängartango"	—	—	—	—	—	—	—	—	—	—	
1966	"Jag kunde aldrig glömma dej"	—	6	—	—	—	—	—	—	—	—	
1966	"Gustav Lindströms Visa"	—	—	—	—	—	—	—	—	—		
1966	"Columbus Fandt Amerika"	—	—	—	—	—	—	—	—	—	—	
1966	"Slid Og Slæb" (Swedish version) "Slid Og Slæb" (German version)	—	2	—	—	—	—	—	—	—	—	
1966	"Frech geküßt ist halb gewonnen"	—	—	—	—	—	17	—	—	—	—	
1966	"Don't Let It Happen Again"	—	—	—	—	—	—	—	—	—		
1967	"Den Person Som Tillgrep En Väska I Grönt I Kön På Centralen Igår" (Swedish version) "The Man Who Took The Valise Off The Floor Of Grand Central Station At Noon" (English version)	19	3	—	—	—	—	—	—	—	—	
1967	"Monsieur Kannibal"	—	6	—	—	—	—	—	—	—	—	
1967	"Sprattelgumma"	5	2	—	—	—	—	32	—	—	—	
1967	"Nånting Fånigt" (B-side to "Sprattelgumma")	—	8	—	—	—	—	—	—	—	—	
1967	"Arvid"	17	4	—	—	—	—	—	—	—	—	
1967	"Downtown" (Swedish version - B-side to "Arvid")	—	10	—	—	—	—	—	—	—	—	
1967	"En hipp häpp happening"	—	7	—	—	—	—	—	—	—	—	
1967	"Samma gamla sång" (B-side to "En hipp häpp happening")	—	8	—	—	—	—	—	—	—	—	
1967	"En Lille Dumhed" (with Otto Brandenburg)	—	—	—	—	—	—	—	—	—	—	
1967	"Ein Neues Spiel"	—	—	—	—	—	30	—	—	—	—	
1967	"Hier Kommt Ein Herz Für Dich"	—	—	—	—	—	—	—	—	—	—	
1968	"Jon Andreas Visa"	—	15	—	—	—	—	—	—	—	—	
1968	"Den Som Lever Får Se" (B-side to "Jon Andreas Visa")	—	10	—	—	—	—	—	—	—	—	
1968	"Min Rockefeller"	—	—	—	—	—	—	—	—	—	—	
1968	"Var Finns Det Ord" (B-side to "Min Rockefeller")	—	14	—	—	—	—	—	—	—	—	
1968	"Livet är fullt av svindlande höjder"	—	—	—	—	—	—	—	—	—	—	
1968	"Mamma Är Lik Sin Mamma" (Swedish version) "Sadie (The Cleaning Lady)" (English version)	2	1	—	—	—	—	—	—	—	—	
1968	"Ingenting går upp mot gamla skåne" (B-side to "Mamma Är Lik Sin Mamma")	—	7	—	—	—	—	—	—	—	—	
1968	"Sen drömmer jag ekn stund om dej"	12	4	—	—	—	—	—	—	—	—	
1968	"Hjälten hela dan, Tegelbruksgatan 20" (B-side to "Sen drömmer jag ekn stund om dej")	—	4	—	—	—	—	—	—	—	—	
1968	"Carneval In Caracas"	—	—	—	—	—	35	—	—	—	—	
1968	"Olé-Okay"	—	—	—	—	—	26	—	—	—	—	
1968	"Harlekin"	—	—	—	—	—	9	—	59	—	—	
1968	"Zigeunerhochzeit"	—	—	—	—	—	23	—	—	—	—	
1969	"Vackraste paret i världen" (with Svante Thuresson)	—	15	—	—	—	—	—	—	—	—	
1969	" Jag är kvinna, du är man" (with Svante Thuresson) (B-side to Vackraste paret i världen)	—	15	—	—	—	—	—	—	—	—	
1969	"Prima Ballerina"	—	5	—	—	—	13	—	—	—	—	
1969	"Lyckans ost"	—	3	—	—	—	—	—	—	—	—	
1969	"Zum, Zum, Zum"	—	2	—	—	—	—	—	—	—	—	
"—" denotes the single failed to chart or was not released.

==== 1970s ====
Year	Title	Peak chart positions			Album
Year	Title	SWE Kvällstoppen	SWE Svensktoppen	GER	Album
1970	"Regnet det bara öser ner"	5	1	—	
1970	"La La La" (B-side to "Regnet det bara öser ner")	—	6	—	
1970	"Sov inte på tunnelbanan"	—	11	—	
1970	"Både en och två"	—	7	—	
1970	"Det måste vara han"	—	10	—	
1970	"Pröva lite kärlek nå'n gång"	—	11	—	
1970	"Regndråber Drypper"	—	—	—	
1970	"Ljuva Barndomstid"	—	7	—	
1970	"Spanska Siw"	—	11	—	
1970	"Adiolé"	—	—	25	
1970	"Clementine"	—	—	—	
1971	"På en gammal bänk"	6	1	—	
1971	"Ett rött äpple" (B-side to "På en gammal bänk")	—	4	—	
1971	"Lyssna till min melodi"	—	7	—	
1971	"Att man aldrig blir stor"	—	3	—	
1971	"Vind För Våg" (B-side to "Att man aldrig blir stor")	—	14	—	
1971	"Liebe Wie Im Rosengarten"	—	—	47	
1971	"Zwei Augen"	—	—	—	
1972	"Der Wein Ist Gut"	—	—	—	
1972	"Balladen om ett munspel"	—	15	—	
1972	"Teddybjörnen Fredriksson"	—	16	—	
1973	"När du ler"	—	7	—	
1973	"En blomma du får för vår kärlek" (B-side to "När du ler")	—	10	—	
1973	"Peppar, Peppar ta i trä"	—	5	—	
1973	"Som att börja om"	—	—	—	
1973	"Er Liebt Mich"	—	—	—	
1973	"Liebe Heißt L'Amour"	—	—	—	
1974	"Sascha Nimmt Die Geige"	—	—	—	
1974	"Bambu"	—	—	—	
1975	"Paloma Blanca"	8	—	—	
1975	"Det Sa' Boom" (B-side to "Paloma Blanca")	—	3	—	
1976	"Kalle Me' Felan"	—	—	—	
1977	"Liebeskummer Lohnt Sich Nicht"	—	—	—	
"—" denotes the single failed to chart or was not released.

==== 1980s - present day ====
Year	Title	Peak chart positions	Album
Year	Title	SWE	Album
1983	"Dröm om mej" (with Umberto Marcato)	—	
1984	"Käre John" (with Hasse Andersson)	—	
1987	"Es Kann Nicht Immer Rosen Regnen"	—	
1988	"Drömmen om livet"	—	
1988	"Det är kärlek"	—	
1997	"Amore Bambini Pasta"	—	
1998	"Reklame"	—	
1998	"Du Bist Der Anfang Und Das Ziel"	—	
1998	"Ma, Wo Sind Die Clowns"	—	
2000	"Aber Du…"	—	
2000	"Du Bist Der Mann Der Mich Liebt"	—	
2001	"Nur Die Zeit Hat Zeit"	—	
2001	"Oh Hallo"	—	
2002	"Frühling In San Pedro"	—	
2002	"Denkst Du Denn Wirklich..." (with Ulli Schwinge)	—	
2002	"Wellen Auf Dem Ozean"	—	
2002	"Mi Scusi Signor"	—	
2003	"Nimm Mich In Die Arme"	—	
2003	"Jeder Liebt Die Liebe Etwas Anders"	—	
2004	"Nur Die Leisen Worte Zähl'n"	—	
2004	"C'est La Vie"	33	
2008	"Hast Du Jemals Geliebt?"	—	
2013	"Pensionär"	—	
"—" denotes the single failed to chart or was not released.

== Filmography ==
- 1959 – Testfilm Siw Malmkvist
- 1960 – Forelsket i København
- 1960 – Låten från båten
- 1961 – Was macht Papa denn in Italien?
- 1962 – Drei Liebesbriefe aus Tirol
- 1963 – Pop i topp
- 1963 – Verrückt und zugenäht
- 1965 – Siw Malmkvist Show (Svensk TV-produktion AB)
- 1979 – Trolltider (Sveriges Television's Christmas Calendar)
- 1981 – Varning för Jönssonligan
- 1996 – The Hunchback of Notre Dame (Swedish voice for Laverne)
- 1999 – Tarzan (Swedish voice for Tantor's mother)
- 2000 – Peter-No-Tail and the Great Treasure Hunt
- 2000 – The Emperor's New Groove (Swedish voice for Yzma)
- 2004 – Home on the Range (Swedish voice for Pearl)
- 2004 – Howl's Moving Castle (Swedish voice for Witch of the Waste)
- 2009 – Så olika
- 2011 – Getingdans
- 2019 – Enkelstöten (TV series)
- 2021 – Seniorsurfarna (TV series)
- 2021 – Så mycket bättre (TV series)

== Notes ==
Preceded by Brita Borg with Augustin	Sweden in the Eurovision Song Contest; 1960	Succeeded by Lill-Babs with April, April
Preceded by Wenche Myhre with Ein Hoch der Liebe	Germany in the Eurovision Song Contest; 1969	Succeeded by Katja Ebstein with Wunder gibt es immer wieder
