= Olle Adolphson =

Swedish singer-songwriter and writer

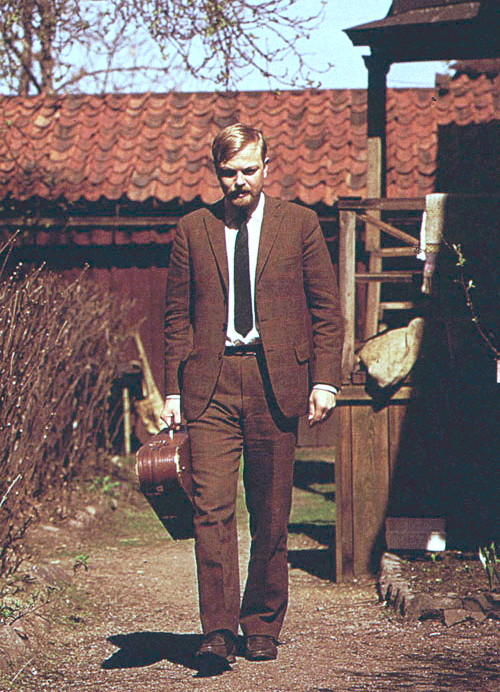
- Olle Adolphson, 1963

Background information
- Born: 2 May 1934; Stockholm, Sweden
- Died: 10 March 2004 (aged 69) Stockholm, Sweden
- Occupation(s): Singer, Songwriter
- Instrument: Guitar
- Years active: 1956–2004

Olle Adolphson (2 May 1934 – 10 March 2004) was a Swedish writer, singer and songwriter. He released a range of books (Aubade, Foliá), LPs (En stol på Tegnér, etc.) and CDs (Älskar inte jag dig då, Mässa på svenska språket, etc.).

He was born and died in Stockholm, and was the son of the actor Edvin Adolphson and the actress Mildred Mehle. He was the brother of the actress Kristina Adolphson.

Adolphson's theme was, according to himself, "to see the great in small things and the small in big things". Some of his most loved songs follow that description, for example Gustaf Lindströms visa ("The Ballad of Gustaf Lindström", about the human victims of urban renewal), Trubbel ("Trouble", about male disappointments and defeats), Nu har jag fått den jag vill ha ("Now I've got the one I want", about the futility of getting one's wishes), and Sigge Skoog (about the unreliability of memories: Sigge, can one remember how one has felt, although only pictures remain? Or have I lied to us both, as I lied you full of tales when we were young?.)

He also equipped most of his songs with catchy tunes which in some cases have made it as instrumental versions. He also sang songs with texts by others, e.g. Beppe Wolgers, Nils Ferlin or Lars Forssell and his own music. Among his most popular songs are "Okända djur" (Unknown Animals), "Mitt eget land" (My Own Land) and "Det gåtfulla folket" ("The Enigmatic People", a song about children) with lyrics by Beppe Wolgers (1950s) and his own "Trubbel" (Trouble).

Adolphson wrote most of his songs in a short period, from the late 1950s to the early 1970s, afterwards turning to film and choir arrangements, but is still regarded as one of the four great Swedish songwriters of the 1900s, together with Birger Sjöberg, Evert Taube and Cornelis Vreeswijk. He was rather sarcastic about the politically engaged singers who followed him in the late 1960s and 1970s, regarding them as too superficial and simplistic, but remained revered by them as a champion of popular culture values and a critic of bureaucratic development and emotional poverty in general.

Dubbel Trubbel, a homage to Olle Adolphson, performed by various Swedish artists, such as Håkan Hellström, Eva Dahlgren and Frida Hyvönen, was released in 2005.

Olle Adolphson's work has been scrutinized in two academic dissertations; from musicological points of view by Frans Mossberg "Visans Kontinuum – studier i Olle Adolphsons musik och framförandekonst" ["The continuum of balladry — studies in the music and performance art of Olle Adolphson"] (2002), and from lyrical perspectives by Charlotte Ullmert "Visan som gåva" ["Song as a gift"] (2004), both at Lund university. Mossberg musicological studies focused on relationships between words and music, from phonetic perspectives, vocal and musical interpretations and content. They were pioneering among the musicological performance studies of the singer songwriter genre in Sweden – the so called "visa". The thesis included a vast database over Adolphson´s recordings and media appearances, as well as analyses of a number of Adolphons songs. It was heavily referred to in the 10 cd box with collected works "Tystnaden smyger som en katt" EMI (2009).

”Visans kontinuum" (The continuum of balladry) was among the earliest musicological studies published online with linked music clips in Sweden.
