= Petra Nielsen =

Swedish singer and actress

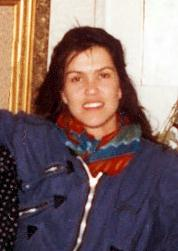
- Petra Nielsen in mid 1993

Background information
- Born: 1 February 1965 (age 60); Stockholm, Sweden
- Occupation(s): singer, actress
- Years active: 1986–

Petra Nielsen (born Petra Magdalena Nielsen 1 February 1965 in Stockholm) is a Swedish singer and actress. She has starred on Broadway during her career. Her mother is Swedish actress Monica Nielsen and her father Swedish-Hungarian photographer Adam Inczédy-Gombos (1940–2020). She is best known for her appearances at the Chinatheater in Stockholm in the 1990s, in musicals including Grease and Fame. She participated in Melodifestivalen in 2004, finishing fourth with "Tango! Tango!". She received some international fame when she appeared in the vampire film Frostbite as one of the main characters, Annika.
