= Ann-Louise Hanson =

Swedish singer

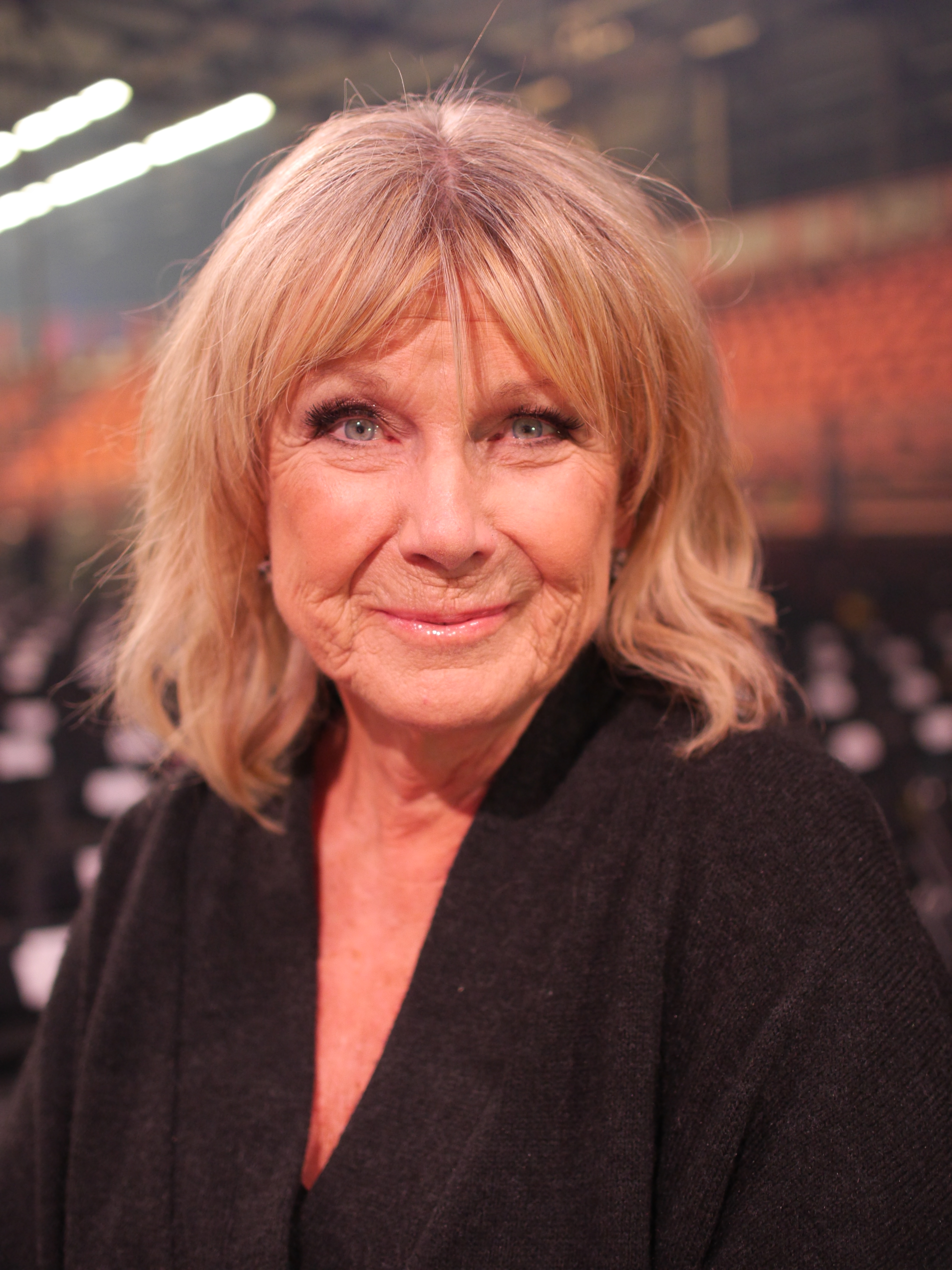
- Ann-Louise Hanson (2019)

Background information
- Born: 4 April 1944 (age 81); Kristianstad, Sweden
- Genres: Schlager
- Occupation: Singer
- Years active: 1956–present

Ann-Louise Hanson (born in Kristianstad in 1944) is a Swedish singer who has been involved in the music industry since 1956.

In 1960, she had her first hit, "Är du ensam i kväll?", a Swedish version of Elvis Presley's "Are You Lonesome Tonight?"

Many of her solo recordings from the 1960s feature Bruno Glenmarks Orkester and, following their marriage, Ann-Louise and Bruno Glenmark formed the group Glenmarks with Bruno's niece Karin and nephew Anders. Soon after, their own GlenDisc record label began producing vinyl, cassettes and eventually CDs under the banner of 'Hanson-Glenmark Production AB'.

Ann-Louise holds the dubious honour of having entered the Swedish Melodifestivalen competition thirteen times without winning once, which is a record in itself. Of those entries, the songs "Bara en enda gång" (a duet with John Ballard) and "Kärleken lever" are amongst her best remembered. Ann-Louise performed one of the entries in the German preselection for the Eurovision Song Contest in 1962. Having moved to France with Bruno in the late 1980s, she now remains a resident of Kristianstad in Sweden.

1986's synth-based Duva – Flyg igen (Doves – Fly Again) is Hanson's most recent studio album, upon which she shared lead vocals with her daughters Jessica and Josefin on the title track, alongside a duet with Billy Preston on "So Good, So Fine".

She participated in Melodifestivalen 2019 with the song "Kärleken finns kvar".

Ann-Louise's daughter Josefin Glenmark recently embarked upon her own musical career.

== Kvällstoppen ==
- 62 – Vita rosor från Athen – 14#
- 62 – Vita sommarmoln – 17#
- 62 – Paradiso – 19#
- 67 – Jag hade en gång en båt (with Cornelis Vreeswijk) – 11#
- 68 – Min greve av Luxemburg (Sind Sie der Graf von Luxemburg) – 3#
- 68 – Arrivederci Frans – 1#
- 68 – Min luftballong – 8#
- 69 – Svenska flicka – 10#
- 72 – Vad än sker – 13#

== Singles ==
Title	Year	Peak chart positions	Album
Title	Year	SWE Heat.	Album
"Kärleken finns kvar"	2019	4	Non-album single
