= Amanda Lear discography =

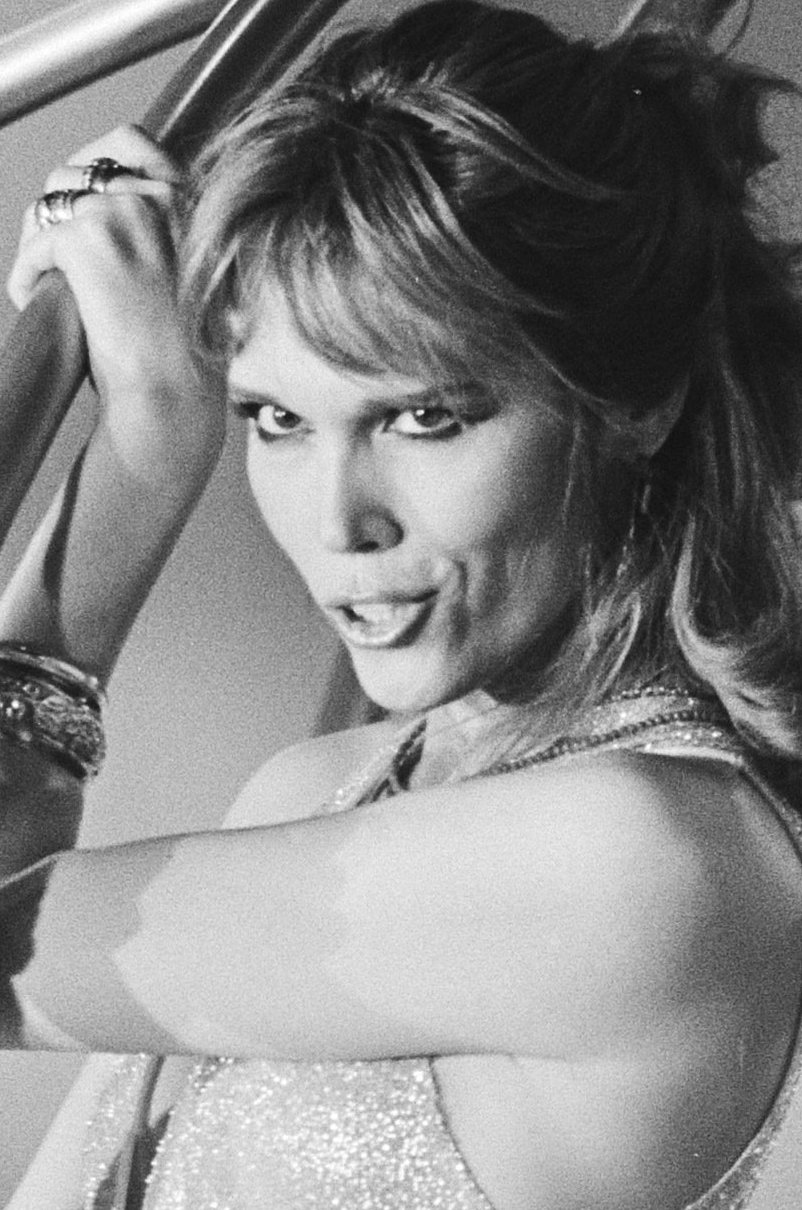
- Studio albums: 19
- Extended plays: 2
- Compilation albums: 38
- Singles: 76
- Video albums: 1
- Music videos: ?

Amanda Lear's discography consists of eighteen full-length studio albums, thirty-eight compilation albums, two extended plays and seventy-six singles. She has also released one video album and numerous music videos.

== Background ==
Lear achieved the greatest international success between 1976 and 1983 when she was signed to West German label Ariola Records. The six Ariola albums were all released in Continental Europe as well as Scandinavia, Japan, South America and some parts of the former Eastern Bloc. Lear was in fact one of the very few Western artists in the 1970s to have her music officially released in the Soviet Union, on state-owned label Melodiya.

Following her initial signing to Ariola, various other labels were used to distribute her records in other nations, for example Chrysalis Records in the United States, Les Disques Direction Records, Siamese Records and Inter Global Records/Epic Records in Canada, RCA Victor in Australasia and South America, Columbia Records/Nippon Columbia in Japan, Eurodisc and Arabella in France, Epic Records in Greece and Cyprus, PGP-RTB in Yugoslavia, and Polydor, RCA Victor and Ariola in Italy. In other European countries like Sweden, albums and singles were first imported West German Ariola pressings. With Lear achieving mainstream success in Sweden in 1980 with album Diamonds for Breakfast, the Scandinavian Ariola distributor, CBS Records, did however start manufacturing its own pressings of both albums and singles to meet with public demand. They also issued singles like "When" in 1980 and "Nymphomania" in 1981, targeted for the Scandinavian market specifically, although these tracks were never A-side releases in West Germany or any other territory.

Despite full-page ads by US licensee Chrysalis Records in Billboard magazine for Sweet Revenge, her personal connections with Bowie and Roxy Music, a feature in Andy Warhol's Interview magazine with photos by Karl Stoecker (the photographer who shot the cover of Roxy Music's For Your Pleasure) and a two-month long promotional tour in the United States in early 1979 that included appearances at discothèques and gay clubs like New York's Paradise Garage, The Saint and The Loft, Lear's commercial success in North America was moderate. Her career as a recording artist in the United Kingdom was similarly lacklustre. Despite promotional gimmicks like red vinyl 12" singles and the Never Trust a Pretty Face album being released as a limited edition picture disc, "the English remained immune to the effect of Amanda Lear", as she has herself described it.

In 1982, Lear took legal action against Ariola-Eurodisc in order to be released from her recording contract on the grounds of artistic differences. The lawsuit was unsuccessful and she remained with the label as stipulated in the original deal until the end of 1983, resulting in single "Incredibilmente donna" and album Tam-Tam being recorded in Italy and double A-side single "Love Your Body"/"Darkness and Light" with Anthony Monn's sound engineer Peter Lüdemann. The relationship between Lear, Monn and her former record company was to stay strained all the way into the late 1990s. Since parting with Ariola-Eurodisc, as of the late eighties a daughter label of BMG-Ariola and eventually absorbed into what is now Sony Music, Lear has been signed to the following labels:

- WEA Italiana (1984) for single "Assassino". Now a part of Warner Music Group.
- Five Records, Italy (1984–1986) for single "Ritmo Salsa" and EP A L. Former Italian label, now defunct.
- Merak Music, Italy (1985–1986) for singles "No Credit Card" and "Women". Former Italian label, now defunct.
- Carrere Records/Carrere Disques, France (1986–1990) for albums Secret Passion and Tant qu'il y aura des hommes, and singles "Les Femmes", "Aphrodisiaque", "Follow Me" (1987 re-recording) and "Thank You". Carrere Records is now a part of the Warner Music Group. European publishing rights to album Secret Passion and worldwide rights to album Tant qu'il y aura des hommes with the exception of title "Métamorphose" are held by Siebenpunkts Verlags GmbH, Germany.
- Virgin Records, Italy (1988) for tracks "Tomorrow (Voulez-vous un rendez-vous)" and "Inch'Allah ça va" with band CCCP Fedeli alla linea. Now a sublabel of EMI.
- Ricordi International, Italy (1989) for album Uomini più uomini. European publishing rights to eight tracks from the album are held by Siebenpunkts Verlags GmbH, Germany.
- Disco 3, Italy (1990) for single "Do You Remember Me?". Former Italian label, now defunct.
- Indisc, Belgium (1992) for single "Fantasy".
- ZYX Music, Germany (1993–1995) for single "Fantasy" and album Alter Ego.
- Chène Music, France (1993) for album Cadavrexquis. Worldwide publishing rights to the album held by Siebenpunkts Verlags GmbH, Germany.
- Giungla Records, Italy (1995) for single "Everytime You Touch Me". Worldwide publishing rights to the track held by Siebenpunkts Verlags GmbH, Germany.
- Dig-It International, Italy (1998). Former Italian label, now defunct. Worldwide publishing rights to eleven tracks on album Back in Your Arms, remixes of 1998 re-recording of "Queen of Chinatown" and tracks "Mellow Yellow", "They're Coming to Take Me Away, Ha-Haaa!" and "C'est si bon" held by Siebenpunkts Verlags GmbH, Germany.
- EMI, France (2000) for Paris Pride re-recording of "Follow Me".
- Caus-N'-ff-ct Records, Germany (2000) for cover version of Giorgio Moroder's "From Here to Eternity". Sublabel of Sony BMG. Publishing rights to the track held by Siebenpunkts Verlags GmbH, Germany.
- Le Marais Prod., France (2001–2002) for album Heart.
- Ice Records, Italy (2002) for track "Cocktail d'amore".
- Virgin Records, Belgium (2002) for single "Beats of Love" with boy band Get Ready!. Sublabel of EMI Music Group.
- Sony BMG, Italy (2004) for single "Martini Disease" with Jetlag.
- Edina Music, France (2005) for compilation Forever Glam!.
- Dance Street Music, France/Germany (2005–2007) for single "Paris by Night" and album With Love. Publishing rights held by Siebenpunkts Verlags GmbH, Germany.
- Just Good Music for Your Ears, Italy (2009) for the Brief Encounters album trilogy.
- Edina Music, France (2009–2010) for EP Brand New Love Affair and single "I'm Coming Up".
- Outsider Music, United States (2010) for single "I'm Coming Up".
- Boomlover (2011–present) for all studio albums from I Don't Like Disco to Tuberose.

== Albums ==
=== Studio albums ===
Title	Details	Peak chart positions								Certifications
Title	Details	AUS	AUT	FRA	GER	ITA	NLD	NOR	SWE	Certifications
I Am a Photograph	Released: 1977; Label: Ariola; Formats: LP, cassette, CD, digital	—	25	—	26	7	—	—	—	
Sweet Revenge	Released: 1978; Label: Ariola; Formats: LP, cassette, CD, digital	50	8	17	4	9	9	—	—	FRA: Gold; GER: Gold
Never Trust a Pretty Face	Released: 1979; Label: Ariola; Formats: LP, cassette	63	—	8	24	—	—	—	20	
Diamonds for Breakfast	Released: 1980; Label: Ariola; Formats: LP, cassette	—	11	—	43	—	—	10	4	
Incognito	Released: 1981; Label: Ariola; Formats: LP, cassette	—	—	—	—	—	—	19	28	
Tam-Tam	Released: December 1983; Label: Ariola; Formats: LP, cassette	—	—	—	—	—	—	—	—	
Secret Passion	Released: 1986; Label: Carrere; Formats: LP, cassette	—	—	—	—	—	—	—	—	
Uomini più uomini	Released: 1989; Label: Ricordi International; Formats: LP, cassette, digital	—	—	—	—	—	—	—	—	
Cadavrexquis	Released: 1993; Label: Chène Music; Formats: CD, cassette	—	—	—	—	—	—	—	—	
Alter Ego	Released: November 1995; Label: ZYX Music; Formats: CD, cassette	—	—	—	—	—	—	—	—	
Back in Your Arms	Released: 20 May 1998; Label: Dig It Int'l; Formats: CD, cassette	—	—	—	—	—	—	—	—	
Heart	Released: 11 December 2001; Label: Le Marais Prod.; Formats: CD	—	—	—	—	—	—	—	—	
With Love	Released: 16 October 2006; Label: Dance Street; Formats: CD, digital	—	—	—	—	—	—	—	—	
Brief Encounters	Released: 16 October 2009; Label: Just Good Music for Your Ears; Formats: CD, digital	—	—	—	—	—	—	—	—	
I Don't Like Disco	Released: 9 January 2012; Label: Little Boom Records; Formats: CD, digital	—	—	—	—	—	—	—	—	
My Happiness	Released: 17 March 2014; Label: Boomlover; Formats: CD, digital	—	—	224	—	—	—	—	—	
Let Me Entertain You	Released: 13 May 2016; Label: Boomlover; Formats: CD, digital	—	—	175	—	80	—	—	—	
Tuberose	Released: 22 Oct 2021; Label: Boomlover; Formats: CD, digital	—	—	—	—	—	—	—	—	
Looking Back	Released: 7 November 2025; Label: Universal Music Deal Distribution; Formats: LP, CD, digital	—	—	193	—	—	—	—	—	

==== Reissues ====
Title	Details
Tant qu'il y aura des hommes (reissue of Uomini più uomini)	Released: 1989; Label: Carrere; Formats: LP, cassette, CD
Tendance (reissue of Heart)	Released: 10 February 2003; Label: Le Marais Prod.; Formats: CD, digital

=== Compilation albums ===
Title	Details
Golden Hits	Released: 1979; Label: Ariola; Formats: LP
Amanda Lear	Released: 1980; Label: Ariola; Formats: 12" EP
Πoeт Аманда Лир	Released: 1981; Label: Melodiya; Formats: LP
Ieri, oggi	Released: 1982; Label: Ariola; Formats: LP, cassette
1 heure avec	Released: 1984; Label: Arabella; Formats: Cassette
Super 20	Released: 1989; Label: Ariola; Formats: CD, cassette
Follow Me – Gold-Serie	Released: 1990; Label: Ariola; Formats: CD, cassette
The Collection	Released: 1 July 1991; Label: BMG-Ariola; Formats: CD, cassette
Télégramme	Released: 5 May 1993; Label: JBR; Formats: CD
Je t'aime	Released: 1993; Label: Joker International; Formats: CD, cassette, digital
Indovina chi sono	Released: 1994; Label: Arcade; Formats: CD
Hits and More	Released: 1995; Label: Giungla; Formats: CD, cassette
Amanda Lear	Released: 16 June 1997; Label: LaserLight Digital; Formats: CD
Queen of Chinatown	Released: 12 January 1998; Label: Ariola; Formats: CD, digital
The Collection	Released: 1998; Label: BMG-Ariola; Formats: CD, cassette, digital
Amanda '98 – Follow Me Back in My Arms	Released: October 1998; Label: BMG-Ariola; Formats: CD
Follow Me	Released: 1999; Label: Versailles; Formats: CD, digital
Follow Me	Released: 2000; Label: Harmony; Formats: CD
Made of Blood & Honey	Released: 2 October 2000; Label: LaserLight Digital; Formats: CD
I'm a Mistery – The Whole Story	Released: 2001; Label: LaserLight Digital; Formats: CD
28 Golden Hits	Released: 30 April 2002; Label: Jaba Music; Formats: CD
Follow Me – The Greatest Hits	Released: 2 September 2002; Label: Mint; Formats: CD
DivinAmanda	Released: 2002; Label: Brioche Edizioni Musicali; Formats: CD
Follow Me	Released: 2002; Label: Falcon Neue Medien; Formats: CD
Essential	Released: 2003; Label: Next Music; Formats: CD
Living Legend	Released: 29 September 2003; Label: ZYX Music; Formats: CD
The Queen Is... Amanda – Platinum Edition	Released: 17 July 2004; Label: Nar International; Formats: CD
Gwiazdy XX wieku – Największe przeboje	Released: 16 September 2004; Label: BMG Poland; Formats: CD, cassette, digital
Forever Glam!	Released: 7 November 2005; Label: Edina Music; Formats: CD
Sings Evergreens	Released: 2 December 2005; Label: Dance Street; Formats: CD
The Sphinx – Das Beste aus den Jahren 1976–1983	Released: 1 September 2006; Label: Sony BMG; Formats: CD, digital
Greatest Hits	Released: 3 August 2007; Label: Eurotrend; Formats: CD
Disco Queen of the Wild 70's	Released: 25 July 2008; Label: TreColori Media; Formats: CD, digital
My French Italian Songbook	Released: 29 October 2010; Label: TreColori Media; Formats: CD, digital
4 Hits	Released: 2011; Label: BMG; Formats: digital EP
Amanda Lear	Released: 1 November 2013; Label: LaserLight Digital; Formats: CD
Collection 2006–2012	Released: 17 November 2013; Label: Boomlover; Formats: digital
Follow Me – The Ultimate Hit-Collection	Released: 8 June 2018; Label: Electrola; Formats: CD, digital

== EPs ==
Title	Details
A L	Released: 1985; Label: Five; Formats: LP, cassette
Brand New Love Affair	Released: 30 November 2009; Label: Edina Music; Formats: CD, digital

== Singles ==
=== As lead artist ===
Title	Year	Chart positions								Album
Title	Year	AUT	BEL	GER	ITA	NLD	NOR	SWE	SWI	Album
"La Bagarre"	1975	—	—	—	—	—	—	—	—	I Am a Photograph
"Blood and Honey"	1976	—	—	12	11	—	—	—	—	I Am a Photograph
"Tomorrow"	1977	—	—	—	1	—	—	—	—	I Am a Photograph
"Blue Tango"	1977	—	—	—	—	—	—	—	—	I Am a Photograph
"Alphabet"	1977	—	—	—	—	—	—	—	—	I Am a Photograph
"Queen of Chinatown"	1977	11	—	2	2	—	—	—	5	I Am a Photograph
"Follow Me"	1978	6	3	3	9	3	—	—	7	Sweet Revenge
"Run Baby Run"	1978	—	—	—	—	—	—	—	—	Sweet Revenge
"Enigma (Give a Bit of Mmh to Me)"	1978	—	10	—	10	11	—	—	—	Sweet Revenge
"Gold"	1978	—	28	—	—	—	—	—	—	Sweet Revenge
"Lili Marleen"	1978	—	—	—	12	—	—	—	—	Never Trust a Pretty Face
"The Sphinx"	1978	—	18	19	—	—	—	—	—	Never Trust a Pretty Face
"Fashion Pack"	1979	—	27	24	26	50	—	13	—	Never Trust a Pretty Face
"Fabulous (Lover, Love Me)"	1979	—	—	25	—	—	—	8	—	Diamonds for Breakfast
"Diamonds"	1979	—	—	30	—	—	7	18	—	Diamonds for Breakfast
"Ho fatto l'amore con me"	1980	—	—	—	—	—	—	—	—	Diamonds for Breakfast
"When"	1980	—	—	—	—	—	—	—	—	Diamonds for Breakfast
"Japan"	1980	—	—	—	—	—	—	—	—	Diamonds for Breakfast
"Solomon Gundie"	1980	—	—	36	—	—	—	—	—	—N/a
"Égal"	1981	—	—	75	—	—	—	—	—	Incognito
"Love Amnesia"	1981	—	—	—	—	—	—	—	—	Incognito
"Nymphomania"	1981	—	—	—	—	—	—	—	—	Incognito
"Red Tape"	1981	—	—	—	—	—	—	—	—	Incognito
"Hollywood Is Just a Dream When You're Seventeen"	1981	—	—	—	—	—	—	—	—	Incognito
"Fever"	1982	—	—	—	—	—	—	—	—	—N/a
"Incredibilmente donna"	1982	—	—	—	39	—	—	—	—	Ieri, oggi
"Love Your Body"	1983	—	29	—	—	—	—	—	—	—N/a
"No Regrets"	1983	—	—	—	—	—	—	—	—	Tam-Tam
"Assassino"	1984	—	—	—	—	—	—	—	—	—N/a
"Ritmo Salsa"	1984	—	—	—	—	—	—	—	—	—N/a
"No Credit Card"	1985	—	—	—	—	—	—	—	—	—N/a
"Women"	1985	—	—	—	—	—	—	—	—	—N/a
"Les Femmes"	1986	—	—	—	—	—	—	—	—	Secret Passion
"Wild Thing"	1987	—	—	—	—	—	—	—	—	Secret Passion
"Aphrodisiaque"	1987	—	—	—	—	—	—	—	—	Secret Passion
"Time's Up"	1987	—	—	—	—	—	—	—	—	Secret Passion
"Follow Me" (New Mix)	1987	—	—	—	—	—	—	—	—	—N/a
"Thank You"	1988	—	—	—	—	—	—	—	—	—N/a
"Gold"/"Follow Me" (The '89 Remixes)	1989	—	—	—	—	—	—	—	—	—N/a
"Métamorphose"	1989	—	—	—	—	—	—	—	—	Tant qu'il y aura des hommes
"L'École d'amour"	1990	—	—	—	—	—	—	—	—	Tant qu'il y aura des hommes
"Do You Remember Me"	1990	—	—	—	—	—	—	—	—	—N/a
"Fantasy"	1992	—	—	—	—	—	—	—	—	Cadavrexquis
"Everytime You Touch Me"	1995	—	—	—	—	—	—	—	—	Alter Ego
"Peep!"	1995	—	—	—	—	—	—	—	—	Alter Ego
"Angel Love"	1996	—	—	—	—	—	—	—	—	Alter Ego
"Follow Me"/"Tomorrow" (re-recordings)	1998	—	—	—	—	—	—	—	—	Back in Your Arms
"Blood and Honey" (New Remix '98)	1998	—	—	—	—	—	—	—	—	Amanda '98 – Follow Me Back in My Arms
"I'll Miss You"	1998	—	—	—	—	—	—	—	—	Amanda '98 – Follow Me Back in My Arms
"Queen of Chinatown" (remixes of the 1998 re-recording)	1999	—	—	—	—	—	—	—	—	Back in Your Arms
"Love Boat"	2001	—	—	—	—	—	—	—	—	Heart
"I Just Wanna Dance Again"	2002	—	—	—	—	—	—	—	—	Heart
"Paris by Night"	2005	—	—	—	41	—	—	—	—	—N/a
"Copacabana"	2005	—	—	—	—	—	—	—	—	Forever Glam!
"Someone Else's Eyes" (with Deadstar)	2009	—	—	—	—	—	—	—	—	Brief Encounters
"Brand New Love Affair (In the Mix)"	2009	—	—	—	—	—	—	—	—	Brand New Love Affair
"I Am What I Am"	2010	—	—	—	—	—	—	—	—	Brand New Love Affair
"I'm Coming Up"	2010	—	—	—	—	—	—	—	—	Brand New Love Affair
"Chinese Walk"	2011	—	—	—	—	—	—	—	—	I Don't Like Disco
"I Don't Like Disco"	2011	—	—	—	—	—	—	—	—	I Don't Like Disco
"La Bête et la Belle"	2011	—	—	—	—	—	—	—	—	I Don't Like Disco
"Love at First Sight"	2012	—	—	—	—	—	—	—	—	I Don't Like Disco
"Back to Black"	2012	—	—	—	—	—	—	—	—	Brief Encounters
"Suspicious Minds"	2014	—	—	—	—	—	—	—	—	My Happiness
"Prima del tuo cuore" (with Gianluca De Rubertis)	2016	—	—	—	—	—	—	—	—	Let Me Entertain You
"The Best Is Yet to Come"	2016	—	—	—	—	—	—	—	—	Let Me Entertain You
"Catwalk"	2017	—	—	—	—	—	—	—	—	Let Me Entertain You
"More"	2021	—	—	—	—	—	—	—	—	Tuberose
"Le bel âge"	2021	—	—	—	—	—	—	—	—	Tuberose
"Immortels"	2021	—	—	—	—	—	—	—	—	Tuberose
"Follow Me (2.0.2.3.)"	2023	—	—	—	—	—	—	—	—	—N/a

=== As featured artist ===
Title	Year	Chart positions			Album
Title	Year	BEL	HUN	ITA	Album
"Tomorrow (Voulez-vous un rendez-vous)" (with CCCP Fedeli alla linea)	1988	—	—	40	—N/a
"From Here to Eternity" (Giorgio Moroder vs. Eric D. Clark feat. Amanda Lear)	2000	—	—	—	DJ Empire Presents: A Tribute to Giorgio Moroder
"Beats of Love" (with Get Ready!)	2002	48	—	—	Tendance
"Queen of Chinatown" (Sterbinszky & Zola feat. Amanda Lear)	2005	—	5	—	Revival
"Queen of Chinatown 2006" (with DJenetix)	2006	—	—	—	Disco Celebration – 40 Remixed Hits of the 70s & 80s

== Video albums ==
Title	Details
Live in Concert 1979	Released: 1980, 2008; Label: VCL, DF Presse SAS; Formats: VHS, DVD

== Music videos ==
Note that the list is incomplete
Title	Year	Director(s)
"Blue Tango"	1977	
"Tomorrow"	1977	
"Tomorrow"	1978	Michael Leckebusch
"Blood and Honey"	1978	Michael Leckebusch
"Comics"	1978	Michael Leckebusch
"Blue Tango"	1978	Michael Leckebusch
"Alligator"	1978	Michael Leckebusch
"Follow Me"	1978	Michael Leckebusch
"These Boots Are Made for Walkin'"	1978	Michael Leckebusch
"Alphabet"	1978	Michael Leckebusch
"The Sphinx"	1978	Michael Leckebusch
"The Stud"	1978	Michael Leckebusch
"Queen of Chinatown"	1978	Michael Leckebusch
"I Am a Photograph"	1978	Michael Leckebusch
"Run Baby Run"	1978	
"Diamonds"	1980	
"Solomon Gundie"	1980	
"Égal"	1981	
"Made in France"	1981	
"Red Tape"	1981	
"Hollywood Is Just a Dream"	1982	Davide Rampello, Valerio Lazarov
"Fashion Pack"	1982	Davide Rampello, Valerio Lazarov
"Incredibilmente donna"	1982	Davide Rampello, Valerio Lazarov
"Ho fatto l'amore con me"	1982	Davide Rampello, Valerio Lazarov
"New York"	1982	Davide Rampello, Valerio Lazarov
"Blue Tango"	1982	Davide Rampello, Valerio Lazarov
"Tomorrow"	1982	Davide Rampello, Valerio Lazarov
"Follow Me"	1983	Davide Rampello, Valerio Lazarov
"Love Your Body"	1983	
"No Regrets"	1983	Gino Landi
"Assassino"	1984	Mauro Bolognini
"Ritmo Salsa"	1984	Giancarlo Nicotra, Romolo Siena
"Hotel Palace"	1985	Giancarlo Nicotra, Romolo Siena
"Stato d'allarme"	1985	Giancarlo Nicotra, Romolo Siena
"Insomnia"	1985	Giancarlo Nicotra, Romolo Siena
"New York"	1985	Giancarlo Nicotra, Romolo Siena
"Berlin Lady"	1985	Giancarlo Nicotra, Romolo Siena
"I Need a Man"	1985	Giancarlo Nicotra, Romolo Siena
"No Credit Card"	1985	
"Women"	1985	
"Les Femmes"	1986	
"Tomorrow (Voulez-vous un rendez-vous)"	1988	
"Thank You"	1988	
"Follow Me"	1993	
"Peep!"	1995	
"I Just Wanna Dance Again"	2002	Kris Gautier
"With Love"	2006	Denis Larrieste
"Someone Else's Eyes"	2009	Fabio Tibaldi
"Brand New Love Affair (In the Mix)"	2009	
"Doin' Fine"	2010	
"Chinese Walk"	2011	Thibault Guerin
"La Bête et la Belle"	2012	Fred Gasimov
"Suspicious Minds"	2014	Thibault Guerin
"What Now My Love (Et maintenant)"	2014	Thibault Guerin
"Mai più"	2015	
"The Best Is Yet to Come"	2016	
"Prima del tuo cuore"	2016	Maria Cuevas
"Catwalk"	2017	Thibault Guerin
"More"	2021	Thibault Guerin
"(Have I Stayed) Too Long at the Fair?"	2022	Thibault Guerin
