= Poet Amanda Lear =

Compilation album by Amanda Lear
- Released: 1981
- Recorded: 1977–1978
- Genre: Euro disco
- Language: English, French
- Label: Melodiya
- Producer: Anthony Monn

Amanda Lear chronology
Incognito (1981)	Poet Amanda Lear (1981)	Ieri, oggi (1982)

Poet Amanda Lear (Cyrillic: Πoeт Аманда Лир; Russian for Amanda Lear Sings) is a compilation album by French singer Amanda Lear, first released in 1981 by Melodiya.

== Background ==
The album was released in the former Soviet Union by state-owned label Melodiya, featuring material from Lear's first three studio albums, released between 1977 and 1979. The LP mostly consists of songs from Never Trust a Pretty Face, to the extent that it retains the original track listing of its side B. The only track from that album not to be approved of by the Russian authorities was the German wartime classic "Lili Marleen". The compilation features two tracks from Sweet Revenge and only one song from I Am a Photograph, omitting most of Lear's greatest hits of the disco era. While a number of flexi discs with Lear's recordings was released in both the Soviet Union and other parts of the Eastern Bloc during the 1980s, the Poet Amanda Lear compilation was one of the few releases to actually be pressed on vinyl and released with a proper picture sleeve. Originally released in 1981, the LP was re-issued a number of times up until 1990. It has been voted the 10th favourite album of 1981 in the Soviet Union.

Along with The Beatles, ABBA and Boney M., Amanda Lear was one of the very few Western pop acts during the Cold War era to have her music officially released in the Soviet Union by Melodiya. Both I Am a Photograph and Sweet Revenge were released by Ariola Records in East Germany in 1978 and were then followed by a series of singles and EPs issued by DDR record label Amiga in the late 1970s and early 1980s, which found their way to other parts of Eastern Europe. An official visit to the USSR was scheduled for 1982, but ultimately cancelled because Lear was involved in a legal dispute with her record company at the time.

Lear has gained a large and lasting fanbase in the entire Eastern Bloc, and in late November 1997 she finally was able to visit Moscow, appearing on a TV show broadcast during the Russian New Year's festivities with an audience of approximately fifty million viewers.

== Track listing ==
Side A

1. "Реклама Вокруг Нас" ("Fashion Pack") (Anthony Monn, Amanda Lear) – 5:05
2. "Забудь Это" ("Forget It") (Anthony Monn, Amanda Lear) – 4:10
3. "Голубое Танго" ("Blue Tango") (Leroy Anderson, Amanda Lear) – 2:40
4. "Голливудский Кадр" ("Hollywood Flashback") (Anthony Monn, Amanda Lear) – 4:31
5. "Комиксы" ("Comics") (Charly Ricanek, Amanda Lear) – 3:40
6. "Никогда Не Доверяй Красивому Лицу" ("Never Trust a Pretty Face") (Anthony Monn, Amanda Lear) – 4:45

Side B

1. "Сфинкс" ("The Sphinx") (Anthony Monn, Amanda Lear) – 4:20
2. "Черные Ямы" ("Black Holes") (Anthony Monn, Amanda Lear) – 5:00
3. "Интеллектуально" ("Intellectually") (Charly Ricanek, Amanda Lear) – 4:15
4. "Зеркало" ("Miroir") (Amanda Lear) – 2:00
5. "Мечтатель" ("Dreamer (South Pacific)") (Rainer Pietsch, Amanda Lear) – 5:10

== Release history ==
Year	Region	Format(s)	Label
1981	USSR	LP	Melodiya
