= Eva Sinclair =

Eva Sinclair may refer to:

- Eva Sinclair (violinist) on My Happiness (album)
- Eva Sinclair, fictional character in Under the Dome (TV series)
- Eva Sinclair, fictional character in The Originals (TV series)
