= Paris by Night (disambiguation) =

Paris by Night is a direct-to-video series featuring Vietnamese-language musical variety shows.

Paris by Night may also refer to:

- Paris by Night (1930 film), a French comedy film
- Paris by Night (1988 film), a British thriller film
- Paris by Night (2012 film), a French crime film
- "Paris by Night" (song), a 2005 song by Amanda Lear
- Paris by Night, a 2013 album by Bob Sinclar
- "Paris by Night", a 2002 song by Thomas Bangalter from the Irréversible film soundtrack
