= Tant qu'il y aura des hommes =

Studio album (reissue of Uomini più uomini) by Amanda Lear
- Released: 1989
- Genre: Pop
- Length: 41:08
- Language: French, Italian
- Label: Carrere
- Producer: Stefano Previsti

Amanda Lear chronology
Uomini più uomini (1989)	Tant qu'il y aura des hommes (1989)	Super 20 (1989)

Tant qu'il y aura des hommes (French for As Long as There Are Men) is a reissue of French singer Amanda Lear's studio album Uomini più uomini. The album was released in 1989 by Carrere Records.

== Background ==
Following the release of the Italian language album Uomini più uomini in 1989, Amanda Lear went back into studio to re-record some of the songs in French. The album was recorded at BIPS Studios in Milan and mixed at Heaven Studio in Rimini. Side A consists of four French language versions of songs from Uomini più uomini and one new recording, "Métamorphose", while side B contains five tracks from the original Italian release. The French version of "Telegramma", entitled "Télégramme", was recorded during these sessions, but ultimately not included in the final track listing. The song would later appear on various mid-price CD compilation.

The dance track "Métamorphose" was released as the lead single in 7" format, and, despite numerous TV performances, failed to chart. "L'École d'amour" followed as the second and final single from the album, released on 7" disc in 1990, but was a commercial failure as well.

Tant qu'il y aura des hommes was released by Carrere Records as Lear's second album for the label, after 1986's Secret Passion. It was also her first studio album to be issued in a limited edition on compact disc. The front covers of LP and CD editions differed slightly, sporting white and blue backgrounds, respectively.

Parts of Tant qu'il y aura des hommes material have since been re-packaged and re-released on budget CD compilations, often combined with selected tracks from its Italian language predecessor and other recordings:

- 1993: Télégramme, released in France by JBR Records. Consists of the entire Tant qu'il y aura des hommes album in re-arranged order, excluding "Métamorphose" in favour of "Télégramme". Re-released in 1994 in France by Arcade with the same title and track listing.
- 1993: Je t'aime, released in Italy by Joker. Consists of a selection of Uomini più uomini and Tant qu'il y aura des hommes tracks, plus "Télégramme". Re-released twice in France with the same track listing but different titles: as Essential in 2001 by Next Music, and Je t'aime in 2002 by Puzzle Productions.
- 1994: Indovina chi sono, released in Germany by Arcade/Mint Records. Consists of the same track listing as Je t'aime, adding "Ripassi domani" and the 1993 re-recording of "Lili Marleen". Re-released in 1995 in Germany and Russia by Mint Records with the same title and track listing.
- 2010: My French Italian Songbook, released in Germany by TreColori Media. Consists of the same track listing as Je t'aime, adding "Assassino ", "C'est si bon" and "Stato d'allarme".

== Track listing ==
Side A

1. "Ma chére Claire" (Willy Molco, Vito Pallavicini, Paolo Conte) – 3:38
2. "Métamorphose" (Jérémy Coquement, L.L.H.) – 3:59
3. "Demain" (Amanda Lear, Willy Molco, Vito Pallavicini, Paolo Conte) – 4:15
4. "L'École d'amour" (Amanda Lear, Daiano) – 4:30
5. "Echec et mat" (Amanda Lear, Massimo Poggini, Daiano, Giulio Caliandro) – 4:30

Side B

1. "Una notte insieme a te" (Sergio Menegale, Raffaele Ferrato) – 3:51
2. "Indovina chi sono" (Paolo Limiti, P. Leon) – 3:22
3. "Ragazzino" (Daiano, Giulio Caliandro) – 4:18
4. "Una rosa un tango" (Cristiano Malgioglio, Corrado Castellari) – 4:05
5. "Due" (Carlo Zavaglia, Sabino Mogavero, Franco Graniero) – 3:27

== Personnel ==
- Amanda Lear – lead vocals, inside cover illustration
- Andre Bourlakoff – make-up
- Nicola Calgari – sound technician
- Moreno Ferrara – backing vocals, electric guitar
- Mario Flores – sound engineer
- Lalla Francia – backing vocals
- Elodie Grégoire – photography
- Monica Magnani – backing vocals
- Giorgio Mastrota – guest vocals on "Indovina chi sono"
- Paolo Mauri – sound technician
- Pier Carlo Penta – sound engineer
- Stefano Previsti – record producer, musical arranger
- Gennaro Trasi – acoustic guitar

== Release history ==
Year	Region	Format(s)	Label
1989	France	CD, LP, cassette	Carrere Records
