= No Regrets (Amanda Lear song) =

Single by Amanda Lear

from the album Tam-Tam
- B-side: "It's All Over"
- Released: 1983
- Recorded: 1983
- Genre: Pop
- Length: 4:26
- Label: Ariola Records
- Songwriters: Amanda Lear, Paul Micioni, Massimiliano DiCarlo, Robert Masala
- Producer: Roberto Cacciapaglia

Amanda Lear singles chronology
"Love Your Body" (1983)	"No Regrets" (1983)	"Bewitched" (1983)

"No Regrets" is a song by French singer Amanda Lear from her album Tam-Tam released in 1983 by Ariola Records.

== Song information ==
The song was written by Amanda Lear, Paul Micioni, Massimiliano DiCarlo and Robert Masala, and produced by Roberto Cacciapaglia. It was recorded for Lear's final Ariola album, Tam-Tam, and has been described as a highlight on the record.

"No Regrets" was the only regular single from Tam-Tam and on its side B included the break-up ballad "It's All Over" taken from the same LP. The single was only released in Italy, where "No Regrets" was used as the theme song of the second season of Premiatissima which Amanda hosted at that time, and was played during end credits.

In the 2017 book Europe's Stars of '80s Dance Pop, the song is mentioned as one of Lear's "noteworthy tracks" from the 80s.

== Music video ==
The music video for the track consists of only one long take which pictures topless Lear performing the song sat still. She sings verses in dimmed light, positioned sideways, and choruses in brighter light, looking directly into the camera.

== Track listing ==
- 7" Single

A. "No Regrets" – 4:26
B. "It's All Over" – 3:35

- 12" Single

A. "No Regrets" (Extended Vocal Version) – 5:50
B. "No Regrets" (Instrumental Dub) – 5:23
