= Forever Glam! =

Greatest hits album by Amanda Lear
- Released: 7 November 2005
- Recorded: 1976–2005
- Genre: Pop, Eurodisco, dance, dance-pop, diva house
- Language: English, Italian, French
- Label: Edina Music

Amanda Lear chronology
| Tendance (2003) | Forever Glam! (2005) | Sings Evergreens (2005) |

Forever Glam! is a greatest hits album by French singer Amanda Lear released in 2005 by Edina Music.

== Background ==
The CD was released only in France, distributed by Nocturne. While numerous CD collections of Amanda Lear music had been released before, Forever Glam! is notable for being the first compilation to be officially approved of and promoted by the singer herself. The album marked the beginning of Lear's creative collaboration with Alain Mendiburu who would produce or co-produce most of her records since then.

Nearly all tracks are arranged chronologically, representing every stage of Lear's musical career. Besides most of her best known songs from the 1970s, combined with selected tracks from the 1980s, 1990s and 2000s, Forever Glam! includes two new recordings, which had both been released as singles; "Martini Disease", a duet with Italian indie band Jetlag on which Lear recites Charles Baudelaire, and her English-French language take on Barry Manilow's 1978 hit "Copacabana". The compilation also contains three tracks that have never been available on CD before; the evergreens "As Time Goes By" and "Bye Bye Baby", recorded for the 1985 EP A L, as well as the rare 1984 single "Assassino". Included is also Lear's recording of Giorgio Moroder's "From Here to Eternity", remixed by DJ Eric D. Clark, previously not available on any of her solo albums.

The photographs used on the cover were taken by Denis Taranto, and date back to 1979 when one of the images from the session was used on the cover of the single "Fabulous (Lover, Love Me)".

== Track listing ==
1. "Martini Disease" (With Jet Lag) (Emilio Cozzi, Jacopo Rondinelli, Livio Magnini) – 3:25
2. "Blood and Honey" (Anthony Monn, Amanda Lear) – 4:50
3. "Queen of Chinatown" (Anthony Monn, Amanda Lear) – 4:11
4. "Follow Me" (Anthony Monn, Amanda Lear) – 3:50
5. "Fashion Pack" (Long Version) (Anthony Monn, Amanda Lear) – 5:09
6. "Fabulous Lover Love Me" (Rainer Pietsch, Amanda Lear) – 4:13
7. "Assassino" (Cristiano Malgioglio, Luigi Lopez, Amanda Lear) – 3:51
8. "I'm a Mystery" (Seraphim, Amanda Lear, Roland Vincent) – 4:36
9. "Scuola d'amore" (Daiano, Amanda Lear) – 4:30
10. "As Time Goes By" (Herman Hupfeld) – 3:25
11. "Bye Bye Baby" (Jule Styne, Leo Robin) – 3:00
12. "Loving" (David Laloue, Amanda Lear) – 3:38
13. "On the Air Tonight" (Peter Bardens) – 3:29
14. "The Sphinx '98" (Anthony Monn, Amanda Lear) – 4:39
15. "From Here to Eternity" (Giorgio Moroder, Pete Bellotte) – 3:36
16. "Do U Wanna See It" (Laurent Wolf, Thierry Willems, Amanda Lear) – 3:51
17. "I Just Wanna Dance Again" (Pumpin' Dolls Mix) (Laurent Wolf, Thierry Willems) – 3:50
18. "Love Boat" (Charles Fox, Paul Williams) – 3:13
19. "Copacabana" (Barry Manilow, Jack Feldman, Bruce Sussman) – 4:17

== Personnel ==
- Amanda Lear – lead vocals
- Alain-Rudy-Buman – liner notes
- Yvon Chateigner – production
- Alain Mendiburu – production
- C. Ricchi-Fedeli – assistance with liner notes
- Denis Taranto – photography

== Release history ==
| Date | Region | Format(s) | Label |
|---|---|---|---|
| 7 November 2005 | France | CD | Edina Music |
