= Women (Amanda Lear song) =

Single by Amanda Lear
- B-side: "Women Wow Wow"
- Released: 1985
- Recorded: 1985
- Genre: Pop
- Length: 4:08
- Label: Merak Music
- Songwriters: Amanda Lear, Silvano Fossati
- Producers: Roberto Gasparini, Silvano Fossati

Amanda Lear singles chronology
"No Credit Card" (1985)	"Women" (1985)	"Les Femmes" (1986)

"Women" is a song by French singer Amanda Lear released in 1985 by Merak Music.

== Song information ==
"Women" is an uptempo pop song written by Amanda Lear and Silvano Fossati, arranged by Fossati and Pinuccio Pirazzoli, and produced by Fossati and Roberto Gasparini. Its feminist lyrics point out how women's rights have progressed through the ages, and tell about diverse career paths that women can choose to follow in today's society.

The song was released by Merak Music as a standalone single in 1985, with its instrumental version "Women Wow Wow" as the B-side. "Women" replaced "Ritmo Salsa" as the theme song of Italian TV show W le donne which Amanda hosted at that time on Canale 5. It played during end credits in the last season of the show, aired from 1985 to 1986.

== Music video ==
The song's music video consists of short clips in which Amanda channels women working in various professions, loosely following the song's lyrics. The video begins with the singer as a Paleolithic woman from the Stone Age, and then pictures her as a busy professional in a modern office, a politician, a boxer, a housewife with kids, an aviator, a painter, and a prostitute, among others.

== Track listing ==
- 7" Single

A. "Women" – 4:08
B. "Women Wow Wow" – 3:45
