= Secret Passion =

Studio album by Amanda Lear
- Released: 1986
- Recorded: 1986
- Studios: Stefana Studios (Los Angeles, USA); Hollywood Studios (Rome, Italy)
- Genres: Hi-NRG, synthpop
- Length: 33:22
- Label: Carrere Records
- Producers: Christian De Walden, Steve Singer

Amanda Lear chronology
A L (1985)	Secret Passion (1986)	Uomini più uomini (1989)

Secret Passion is the seventh studio album by French singer Amanda Lear, released by Carrere Records in 1986.

== Background ==
Secret Passion was Amanda's first full-length studio album after her departure from Ariola Records. It was recorded in Stefana Studios in Los Angeles and Hollywood Studios in Rome with mostly American composers, musicians and arrangers. Contrary to previous albums, Amanda had little input into songwriting and composing, with minor contributions in only three songs. The material showcased a danceable synthpop sound produced by Christian De Walden with Steve Singer. Secret Passion was released by Carrere Records, a major label in Francophone countries like France, Belgium, Switzerland and Canada in the 1970s and 1980s.

"Les Femmes", a French-language version of "She Wolf", was released as the lead single in 1986. A cover of The Troggs' "Wild Thing" and "Time's Up" were released in early 1987, the latter only in the United Kingdom. "Aphrodisiac" was re-recorded in French and re-titled "Aphrodisiaque" for its release as a single exclusively in France. During the album's recording sessions, an updated dance version of Lear's signature tune "Follow Me" was recorded, and subsequently released as a single to promote Secret Passion, although it was not included on the album. Despite frequent television performances, none of the singles managed to chart.

The album was not only intended to be a European comeback for Amanda Lear, after a few years of working primarily as a successful TV presenter, but also a serious attempt to launch her career in English-speaking countries like the USA, Canada and the United Kingdom as well. However, as she was getting ready to start promoting Secret Passion, Lear was seriously injured in a near fatal car crash. She had to spend months in convalescence and was unable to promote the album. As a result, it did not fare as well commercially as had been hoped and planned for.

While the album has not had a CD release as such, tracks have surfaced on a number of compilations licensed by Siebenpunkts Verlag Gmbh/ZYX Music/Mint Records over the years and all eight songs have appeared on compilations I'm a Mistery – The Whole Story (2001) and Living Legend (2003).

== Track listing ==
Side A

1. "Desire" (Cale Roberts, Frank Anselmo) – 4:18
2. "Wild Thing" (Chip Taylor) – 3:36
3. "I Want My Name on a Billboard" (Steve Singer, Margaret Harris, Peter Van Asten, Richard DeBois) – 4:25
4. "She Wolf" (Madelynn Von Ritz, Gary M. Johnson) – 4:17

Side B

1. "Mannequin" (Michael Price, Amanda Lear) – 3:32
2. "I'm a Mistery" (Seraphim, Amanda Lear, Roland Vincent) – 4:35
3. "Aphrodisiac" (Mike Stepstone, Steve Singer, Amanda Lear, Lenny Macaluso) – 3:44
4. "Time's Up" (Mara Cubeddu, Michael Bernard, Bob Esty) – 4:55

== Personnel ==
- Amanda Lear – lead vocals
- Rocco Barocco – dress
- Rick Braun – trumpet
- Kim Bullard – synthesizers
- Charlie Cannon – backing vocals
- Frank Castiglia – backing vocals
- Claude Caudron – artwork
- Rosie D'Andrea – backing vocals
- Christian De Walden – record producer, musical and vocal arranger, executive producer, mixing
- Stacey Dunne – backing vocals
- Michael Fisher – percussion
- Denny Fongheiser – drums
- Kiko Fusco – sound engineer
- Brian Gardner – mastering
- John Inglodsby – assistant sound engineer
- Marco Manusso – guitar
- Maurizio Mariani – assistant sound engineer
- Carlo Mezzano – executive producer
- Victoria Miller – backing vocals
- Doug Norwine – saxophone
- Carol Parks – backing vocals, vocal arranger
- Dean Parks – guitar
- Bob Parr – bass guitar
- John C. Parr – guitar
- Greg Penny – sound engineer, mixing
- Leslie Perkins – backing vocals
- Eddiy Petrolati – assistant sound engineer
- Michael Price – synthesizers
- Debbie Rider – backing vocals
- Annie Robert – backing vocals
- Roberto Rocchi – cover photo
- Denise Rosner – backing vocals
- Tom Walsh – drums
- Joe Seta – sound engineer
- Steve Singer – record producer, musical arranger, executive producer, synthesizers

== Release history ==
Year	Region	Format(s)	Label
1986	France	LP, cassette	Carrere Records
1986	Portugal	LP	Carrere Records
1987	Greece	LP	Carrere Records
1987	United Kingdom	LP, cassette	Carrere Records
1987	Canada	LP	Power Records
