= Tam-Tam (album) =

Studio album by Amanda Lear
- Released: December 1983
- Recorded: 1983
- Studio: Regson Studios (Milan, Italy)
- Genre: Pop, new wave
- Length: 33:02
- Label: Ariola
- Producer: Roberto Cacciapaglia

Amanda Lear chronology
Ieri, oggi (1982)	Tam-Tam (1983)	A L (1985)

Tam-Tam is the sixth studio album by French singer Amanda Lear, released in 1983 by West German label Ariola Records.

== Background ==
Tam-Tam was Amanda's last album with Ariola Records and was mainly recorded only to fulfill her contract with the label. It was also her first full-length release not to be produced in Munich by Anthony Monn, but only by Italian musicians, primarily Roberto Cacciapaglia who produced the entire material. The album is a blend of synthesizer-based pop and new wave music. Lyrically, it references African folklore, mainly dealing with topics such as black magic. Amanda explained in a 1983 interview: "I'm fascinated with Voodoo, Macumba, exorcisms. Basically, the sphere that goes beyond the perception of rationality".

The album artwork is credited to Graphic Studio CGD. It portrays Amanda as a witch. The dress and jewelry are credited to Artemio of Milano, and the photographs are by Angelo Deligio.

Although Lear performed songs from the album on the popular Italian TV show Premiatissima, she did not promote the album in the rest of Europe and neither did the record company because of their complicated relationship at the time. "No Regrets" was released as a single in Italy only, and no singles were released internationally to promote the album. "Bewitched" was then released as a promotional single, again only on Italian market. Lack of promotion largely contributed to Tam-Tam's subsequent commercial failure. The LP failed to chart and remains her lowest-selling Ariola album.

The rights to the Ariola-Eurodisc back catalogue are currently held by Sony BMG. Like most of Amanda's albums from the Ariola Records era, Tam-Tam has not received the official CD re-issue.

== Track listing ==
Side A

1. "Tam Tam" (Amanda Lear, Villahermosa, Roberto Cacciapaglia) – 3:37
2. "Bewitched" (Amanda Lear, Tony Carasco, Roberto Cacciapaglia, Pino Nicolosi, Lino Nicolosi) – 4:32
3. "Wicked Lady" (Amanda Lear, Roberto Cacciapaglia) – 4:27
4. "No Regrets" (Amanda Lear, Paul Micioni, Massimiliano DiCarlo, Roberto Masala) – 4:28

Side B

1. "Magic" (Amanda Lear, Roberto Cacciapaglia) – 4:14
2. "It's All Over" (Amanda Lear, Sergio Menegale, Raffaele Ferrato) – 3:39
3. "Gipsy Man" (Amanda Lear, Tony Carrasco, Pino Nicolosi) – 4:29
4. "Music Is" (Amanda Lear, Roberto Cacciapaglia) – 3:36

== Personnel ==
- Amanda Lear – lead vocals
- Paolo Bocchi – sound engineer
- Roberto Cacciapaglia – record producer, musical arranger
- Maurizio Cannici – executive producer
- Tony Carrasco – drum programming, production assistance
- Claudio Cattafesta – electric guitars
- Angelo Deligio – photography
- Stefano Previsti – keyboards, arrangement assistance

== Release history ==
Year	Region	Format(s)	Label
1983	Europe	LP, cassette	Ariola Records
