= My Happiness (album) =

Studio album by Amanda Lear
- Released: 17 March 2014
- Recorded: April–November 2013
- Genre: Pop
- Length: 45:15 (Original edition); 1:24:00 (Deluxe edition)
- Label: Boomlover
- Producer: Alain Mendiburu

Amanda Lear chronology
I Don't Like Disco (2012)	My Happiness (2014)	Let Me Entertain You (2016)

Professional ratings
Review scores
Source	Rating
Music Story	3/5 stars

My Happiness is a studio album by French singer Amanda Lear, released on March 17, 2014 by the independent label Boomlover. The album is a tribute to Elvis Presley.

== Background ==
Amanda Lear began her musical career with a cover version of Elvis Presley's "Trouble" in 1975, and has since also recorded "Fever" (1982) and "Always on My Mind" (2009), both songs closely associated with his repertoire. My Happiness features thirteen songs previously performed by Presley, and is Lear's third album consisting exclusively of cover versions, after A L and With Love.

Lear announced working on a new album in May 2013, via her official Facebook page, with originally planned release date in autumn 2013. The recording sessions would eventually continue into November at Studio Entouka in Paris, and the album received its release in March 2014.

"Suspicious Minds" was released as the first single in an edited version. The music video, directed by Thibault Guerin, was released on 13 March, followed by "What Now My Love" in June. The album charted in French Physical and Digital Albums Chart, but failed to enter the general sales chart.

The deluxe version of the album was released in November 2014, and included dance remixes of selected songs as well as the previously unreleased cover of "Love Me Tender".

== Track listing ==
=== Original edition ===
1. "Burning Love" (Dennis Linde) – 3:28
2. "Suspicious Minds" (Mark James) – 5:03
3. "All Shook Up" (Otis Blackwell, Elvis Presley) – 2:14
4. "Are You Lonesome Tonight" (Lou Handman, Roy Turk) – 3:07
5. "It's Now or Never" (Aaron Schroeder, Alfredo Mazzucchi, Wally Gold) – 3:22
6. "(You're the) Devil in Disguise" (Bill Giant, Bernie Baum, Florence Kaye) – 2:39
7. "Viva Las Vegas" (Doc Pomus, Mort Shuman) – 2:24
8. "Heartbreak Hotel" (Elvis Presley, Mae Boren Axton, Tommy Durden) – 3:50
9. "What Now My Love" (Carl Sigman, Gilbert Bécaud, Pierre Delanoë) – 3:11
10. "Trouble" (Jerry Leiber and Mike Stoller) – 2:44
11. "You Don't Have to Say You Love Me" (Pino Donaggio, Simon Napier-Bell, Vicki Wickham, Vito Pallavicini) – 3:08
12. "Can't Help Falling in Love" (George David Weiss, Hugo Peretti, Luigi Creatore) – 3:26
13. "My Happiness" (Robert Maxwell) – 2:47

=== Deluxe edition ===
1. "Suspicious Minds" (Almighty Radio Edit) (Mark James) – 4:03
2. "Suspicious Minds" (Dance Mix) (Mark James) – 4:49
3. "(You're the) Devil in Disguise" (Dance Mix) (Chris Hillman, Gram Parsons) – 2:53
4. "Burning Love" (Dance Mix) (Dennis Linde) – 3:56
5. "Viva Las Vegas" (Dance Mix) (Doc Pomus, Mort Shuman) – 2:48
6. "Burning Love" (Dennis Linde) – 3:29
7. "Suspicious Minds" (Mark James) – 5:04
8. "All Shook Up" (Otis Blackwell, Elvis Presley) – 2:14
9. "Are You Lonesome Tonight" (Lou Handman, Roy Turk) – 3:08
10. "It's Now or Never" (Aaron Schroeder, Alfredo Mazzucchi, Wally Gold) – 3:22
11. "(You're the) Devil in Disguise" (Chris Hillman, Gram Parsons) – 2:40
12. "Viva Las Vegas" (Doc Pomus, Mort Shuman) – 2:26
13. "Heartbreak Hotel" (Elvis Presley, Mae Boren Axton, Tommy Durden) – 3:51
14. "What Now My Love" (Carl Sigman, Gilbert Bécaud, Pierre Delanoë) – 3:12
15. "Trouble" (Jerry Leiber and Mike Stoller) – 2:46
16. "Love Me Tender" (Elvis Presley, George R. Poulton, Ken Darby) – 4:08
17. "You Don't Have to Say You Love Me" (Pino Donaggio, Simon Napier-Bell, Vicki Wickham, Vito Pallavicini) – 3:10
18. "Can't Help Falling in Love" (George David Weiss, Hugo Peretti, Luigi Creatore) – 3:28
19. "My Happiness" (Robert Maxwell) – 2:47
20. "Suspicious Minds" (Almighty Club Edit) (Mark James) – 5:45
21. "Suspicious Minds"/"Viva Las Vegas"/"Burning Love"/"(You're the) Devil in Disguise" (Bruce Discomix) (Mark James, Doc Pomus, Mort Shuman, Dennis Linde, Chris Hillman, Gram Parsons) – 14:01

== Personnel ==
- Amanda Lear – lead vocals
- Gaël Brusseleers – sound engineer
- Mauro Delgado-Diaz – trumpet
- Romain Durand – trombone
- Jean Paul Gaultier – clothes
- Thibault Guerin – artwork, photography
- Melina Jacob – backing vocals
- Pierre-Marie Jubin – backing vocals
- Bob Landser – musical arranger, guitar, percussion, piano, backing vocals
- Alix Malka – photography
- Alain Mendiburu – record producer
- Elena Mineva – violin
- Manon Philippe – violin
- Eva Sinclair – violin
- Clément Mao Takacs – orchestra leader
- Dima Tsypkin – violoncello
- Julien Vern – flute

== Chart performance ==
Chart (2014)	Peak position
France (Physical Albums)	185
France (Digital Albums)	197

== Release history ==
Year	Region	Format(s)	Label
17 March 2014	France	CD, digital	Boomlover
17 March 2014	Europe	digital	Boomlover
10 November 2014	Worldwide	digital (deluxe edition)	Boomlover
