= No Credit Card =

Single by Amanda Lear
- B-side: "Jungle Beat"
- Released: 1985
- Genre: Pop
- Length: 3:46
- Label: Merak, Indisc, ZYX
- Songwriter: Sangy
- Producer: Roberto Gasparini

Amanda Lear singles chronology
"Ritmo Salsa" (1984)	"No Credit Card" (1985)	"Women" (1985)

"No Credit Card" is a song by French singer Amanda Lear released in 1985 by Merak Music.

== Song information ==
The song was solely written by Maurizio Sangineto under the pseudonym "Sangy", produced by Roberto Gasparini and was recorded in Sangy's studio in Vicenza, Italy. The song is an uptempo track with synthpop elements.

The single was released through the now-defunct label Merak Music in Italy, with "Jungle Beat" on side B, which de facto was an instrumental version of the title song. In Belgium, it was released by Indisc, and by ZYX Records in Germany. "No Credit Card" was never included on any Amanda Lear album, but it appeared on the 1985 various artists compilation The Best of Italo Disco Vol. 4, released by ZYX in Germany. The song was promoted on Italian television, but was not a chart success.

In the 2017 book Europe's Stars of '80s Dance Pop, "No Credit Card" is mentioned as one of Lear's "noteworthy tracks" from the 80s.

== Music video ==
In the song's music video, Amanda is seen walking through a city dressed in a tribal outfit, and performing the song outside a cottage in a forest and from behind jail bars.

== Track listing ==
- 7" Single

A. "No Credit Card" – 3:46
B. "Jungle Beat" – 4:00

- 12" Single

A. "No Credit Card" – 6:58
B. "Jungle Beat" – 4:16
