= Let Me Entertain You (Amanda Lear album) =

Studio album by Amanda Lear
- Released: 13 May 2016
- Recorded: September 2015–February 2016
- Genres: Pop, dance
- Length: 67:44 (Digital edition)
- Languages: English, French, Italian
- Label: Boomlover
- Producer: Alain Mendiburu

Amanda Lear chronology
My Happiness (2014)	Let Me Entertain You (2016)	Tuberose (2021)

Let Me Entertain You is a studio album by French singer Amanda Lear, released in May 2016 by the independent label Boomlover.

== Background ==
The album was recorded at Studio Richer in Paris from September 2015 to February 2016. Stylistically, it is a diverse collection of ballads and uptempo pop/dance tracks. It includes some new material written by Lear herself and her collaborators Gaël Brusseleers and Bob Landser, alongside the re-recordings of her 70s hits "Follow Me" and "Fashion Pack" as well as cover versions of Charlie Chaplin's "Smile", Frankie Valli's "Can't Take My Eyes Off You" and the Village People's "Macho Man", among others. The physical edition came with a DVD of Amanda performing selected songs from the album.

Lear announced the album's release date on her social media in March 2016. The Italian ballad "Prima del tuo cuore" recorded with Gianluca De Rubertis (with whom Lear had collaborated on the song "Mai più" the previous year) was released as the lead single in late April 2016. The second single was "The Best Is Yet to Come", released shortly before the album in May 2016. "Catwalk" was chosen as the third single, released in early 2017, accompanied by multiple remixes. The album was a minor chart success in Italy and France.

== Track listing ==
=== Physical edition ===
CD

1. "Let Me Entertain You" (Jule Styne, Stephen Sondheim) – 2:59
2. "Good to Be Bad" (Ken Lowe, Claire Dewey) – 3:36
3. "Si tu savais ma belle" (Alain Largouadette) – 3:14
4. "Couleurs" (Gael Brusseleers, Bob Landser, Amanda Lear) – 3:01
5. "Mad About the Boy" (Noël Coward) – 2:36
6. "La Rumeur" (Stéphane Corbin, Alexis Michalik) – 2:51
7. "Moi je t'aime aujourd'hui" (Gael Brusseleers, Bob Landser, Amanda Lear) – 2:43
8. "The Best Is Yet to Come" (Gael Brusseleers, Bob Landser, Amanda Lear) – 3:45
9. "Catwalk (A Model)" (Gael Brusseleers, Bob Landser, Amanda Lear) – 3:32
10. "Fashion Pack" (Anthony Monn, Amanda Lear) – 4:23
11. "Can't Take My Eyes Off You" (Bob Crewe, Bob Gaudio) – 3:39
12. "Macho Man" (Jacques Morali, Henri Belolo, Victor Willis, Peter Whitehead) – 3:27
13. "Follow Me" (Anthony Monn, Amanda Lear) – 4:07
14. "The Actress" (Gael Brusseleers, Bob Landser, Amanda Lear) – 3:17
15. "Prima del tuo cuore" (feat. Gianluca De Rubertis) (Gianluca de Rubertis) – 3:07
16. "La Belle Vie" (Sacha Distel, Jean Broussolle) – 2:00
17. "For Me Formidable" (Jacques Plante, Charles Aznavour) – 2:22
18. "Smile" (Charlie Chaplin, Geoffrey Parsons, John Turner) – 3:18

DVD

1. "Let Me Entertain You"
2. "Good to Be Bad"
3. "Si tu savais ma belle"
4. "Couleurs"
5. "Mad About the Boy"
6. "La Rumeur"
7. "Can't Take My Eyes Off You"
8. "Catwalk (A Model)"
9. "For Me Formidable"
10. "Fashion Pack"
11. "Smile"
12. "The Best Is Yet to Come"

=== Digital edition ===
1. "Let Me Entertain You" (Jule Styne, Stephen Sondheim) – 2:59
2. "Good to Be Bad" (Ken Lowe, Claire Dewey) – 3:36
3. "Si tu savais ma belle" (Alain Largouadette) – 3:14
4. "Couleurs" (Gael Brusseleers, Bob Landser, Amanda Lear) – 3:01
5. "Mad About the Boy" (Noël Coward) – 2:36
6. "Moi je t'aime aujourd'hui" (Gael Brusseleers, Bob Landser, Amanda Lear) – 2:43
7. "The Best Is Yet to Come" (Gael Brusseleers, Bob Landser, Amanda Lear) – 3:45
8. "Catwalk (A Model)" (Radio Edit) (Gael Brusseleers, Bob Landser, Amanda Lear) – 3:32
9. "Fashion Pack" (Anthony Monn, Amanda Lear) – 4:23
10. "Can't Take My Eyes Off You" (Edit Version) (Bob Crewe, Bob Gaudio) – 3:39
11. "Macho Man" (Edit Version) (Jacques Morali, Henri Belolo, Victor Willis, Peter Whitehead) – 3:27
12. "Follow Me" (Anthony Monn, Amanda Lear) – 4:07
13. "The Actress" (Gael Brusseleers, Bob Landser, Amanda Lear) – 3:17
14. "Prima del tuo cuore" (feat. Gianluca De Rubertis) (Gianluca de Rubertis) – 3:07
15. "La Rumeur" (Stéphane Corbin, Alexis Michalik) – 2:51
16. "La Belle Vie" (Sacha Distel, Jean Broussolle) – 2:00
17. "For Me Formidable" (Jacques Plante, Charles Aznavour) – 2:22
18. "Smile" (Charlie Chaplin, Geoffrey Parsons, John Turner) – 3:18
19. "Catwalk (A Model)" (Club Edit) (Gael Brusseleers, Bob Landser, Amanda Lear) – 3:54
20. "The Best Is Yet to Come" (B*Gold Remix) (Gael Brusseleers, Bob Landser, Amanda Lear) – 6:03

== Personnel ==
- Amanda Lear – lead vocals
- Sébastien Arrighi – musical arranger (tracks: 6, 8, 10–13)
- Thomas Bouzy – violin
- Gaël Brusseleers – musical arranger (tracks: 7, 9, 14), programming, mixing
- Matteo Buzzanca – musical arranger (track 15)
- Stephane Corbin – piano
- Gianluca De Rubertis – lead vocals (track 15), piano
- Giuliano Dottori – guitar
- Pascal Druelle – photography
- Thibault Guérin – artwork
- Sedrick Hamilton – voice
- Mélina Jacob – backing vocals
- Benjamin Joubert – mastering
- Bob Landser – musical arranger (tracks: 1–5, 16–18), backing vocals, drums, guitar, bass guitar, percussion, piano
- Fanny Leveque – violin
- Alain Mendiburu – record producer
- Elena Mineva – violin
- Manon Philippe – violin
- Maxime Quenesson – cello
- Klaus Roethlisberger – photography
- Hsing-Han Tsai – cello
- Anne-Sophie Versnaeyen – musical arranger (tracks: 6, 8, 10–13)

== Chart performance ==
Chart (2016)	Peak position
France	175
France (Physical Albums)	160
Italy	80

== Release history ==
Date	Region	Format	Label
13 May 2016	France	CD, digital	Boomlover
13 May 2016	Worldwide	digital	Boomlover
