= Uomini più uomini =

Studio album by Amanda Lear
- Released: 1989
- Studios: Bips Studio (Milan, Italy)
- Genre: Pop
- Length: 41:27
- Language: Italian
- Label: Ricordi International
- Producer: Stefano Previsti

Amanda Lear chronology
Secret Passion (1986)	Uomini più uomini (1989)	Tant qu'il y aura des hommes (1989)

Uomini più uomini (Italian for Men More Men) is the eighth studio album by French singer Amanda Lear, released in 1989 by Ricordi International.

== Background ==
On Uomini più uomini, Amanda worked only with Italian musicians. The album was recorded in Milan and mixed at Heaven Studio in Rimini, Italy. The lyrical content of the album talks mainly about love, and is written completely in Italian, making it Lear's first album to consist exclusively of non-English language material. The singer stated the album was recorded as a means to appeal to the Italian audience she had acquired as a TV presenter in Italy. The song "Una notte insieme a te" played during the end credits in her 1989 Italian talk show Ars Amanda.

Uomini più uomini was only released in Italy, where Lear's popularity remained high because of her successful television career over the years. No singles were released, although the material received moderate promotion on TV. The album, however, failed to make much impact on the charts. It would re-appear under the name Tant qu'il y aura des hommes in France the same year, with half of the songs re-recorded in French, adding a new track, "Métamorphose".

The album was initially only available on vinyl and cassette. German company Siebenpunkts Verlags Gmbh has since acquired the publishing rights to the album and in 1993 it was re-released on CD by Farad Records as Indovina chi sono, with a different artwork and re-arranged track listing. Portions of the album would be subsequently re-released many times on different budget CD compilations, combined with tracks from its French language counterpart Tant qu'il y aura des hommes.

== Track listing ==
=== Original edition ===
Side A

1. "Mia cara Clara" (Willy Molco, Vito Pallavicini, Paolo Conte) – 3:38
2. "Telegramma" (Cristiano Malgioglio, Corrado Castellari) – 3:12
3. "Ragazzino" (Daiano, Giulio Caliandro) – 4:18
4. "Ripassi domani" (Willy Molco, Vito Pallavicini, Paolo Conte) – 4:15
5. "Scuola d'amore" (Amanda Lear, Daiano) – 4:30

Side B

1. "Una notte insieme a te" (Sergio Menegale, Raffaele Ferrato) – 3:51
2. "Indovina chi sono" (Paolo Limiti, P. Leon) – 3:22
3. "Una rosa un tango" (Cristiano Malgioglio, Corrado Castellari) – 4:05
4. "Illibata" (Massimo Poggini, Daiano, Giulio Caliandro) – 3:25
5. "Due" (Carlo Zavaglia, Sabino Mogavero, Franco Graniero) – 3:27
6. "La partita di pallone" (Carlo Alberto Rossi, Edoardo Vianello) – 3:24

=== CD edition: Indovina chi sono ===
1. "La partita di pallone" (Carlo Alberto Rossi, Edoardo Vianello) – 3:22
2. "Una notte insieme a te" (Sergio Menegale, Raffaele Ferrato) – 3:51
3. "Illibata" (Massimo Poggini, Daiano, Giulio Caliandro) – 3:25
4. "Una rosa un tango" (Cristiano Malgioglio, Corrado Castellari) – 4:05
5. "Due" (Carlo Zavaglia, Sabino Mogavero, Franco Graniero) – 3:27
6. "Indovina chi sono" (Paolo Limiti, P. Leon) – 3:22
7. "Scuola d'amore" (Amanda Lear, Daiano) – 4:30
8. "Ragazzino" (Daiano, Giulio Caliandro) – 4:18
9. "Mia cara Clara" (Willy Molco, Vito Pallavicini, Paolo Conte) – 3:38
10. "Ripassi domani" (Willy Molco, Vito Pallavicini, Paolo Conte) – 4:15
11. "Telegramma" (Cristiano Malgioglio, Corrado Castellari) – 3:12

== Personnel ==
- Amanda Lear – lead vocals
- Nicola Calgari – sound technician
- Antonio Colombo – mastering
- Moreno Ferrara – backing vocals, electric guitar
- Mario Flores – sound engineer
- Lalla Francia – backing vocals
- Monica Magnani – backing vocals
- Filippo Maniscalco – cover
- Giorgio Mastrota – guest vocals on "Indovina chi sono"
- Paolo Mauri – sound technician
- Pier Carlo Penta – sound engineer
- Stefano Previsti – record producer, musical arranger
- Gennaro Trasi – acoustic guitar

== Release history ==
Year	Region	Format(s)	Label
1989	Italy	LP, cassette	Ricordi International
1993	Italy	CD (Indovina chi sono)	Farad Records
