= Sterbinszky =

Hungarian DJ

DJ sTERBInszky (born: Károly Sterbinszky, 10, November 1972) is a Hungarian DJ.

== Biography ==
Sterbinszky started to make music at around the age of 16, becoming a significant DJ of several smaller clubs. Five years later, in 1993 he won the Hungarian Disco Mix Club Competition. Proving his technical proficiency behind the turntables, the award earned him wider recognition and new opportunities within the Hungarian club entertainment industry. Aside from regular performances at a number of high-profile venues, he also promoted and organized major club events such as SkyLight and Hype Holiday House.

In late 1998 he had released his acclaimed debut recording, a dance mix compilation of club favourites titled, Hits Form Club E-Play. The album’s breakthrough success - partly due to an effective promotional marketing campaign - garnered him nationwide recognition and following establishing Sterbinszky as a professional recording artist, producer and performer at the forefront of Hungary’s dance club industry. Media heralding Sterbinszky as the nation’s first “star DJ”, a number of successful tours followed with sold-out performances and various organised party events at popular club venues.

A sophomore follow-up was released in June of 1999 titled Egy Nyár a Flörtben. The dance mix compilation became an instant critical and commercial success further solidifying Sterbinszky’s mainstream popularity. The album documented a catalog of club hits during Sterbinszky’s tenure as house DJ of the Friday night PlayMate party series held at Flört Dance Club, Siófok.

With a continuing effort to keep the Hungarian club scene up to date, Sterbinszky regularly made routine trips to browse London's record shops. This allowed him to be among the first to consistently showcase newly emerging artists, tracks and mixes in an effort to familiarise Hungarian club-goers with the latest trends in house and trance music form Western Europe. For the next 6 years he’d release further series of club mix compilations – featuring standout tracks already part of his DJ repertoire - on a semi-annual basis with each subsequent album indicating a slight progression of sound while, more or less, still remaining within the genres of house and trance. Though never straying far from his funky/disco house roots, his 2002 Palace mix compilations, however signaled a departure into less commercial domains of deep, progressive house.

The turn of the millennium marked a more prolific phase is Sterbinszky’s career whereby he began producing original compositions on vinyl singles, EP’s, remixes and two full-length solo albums titled, Discography and Gates of Mind released in 2000 and 2001 respectively. The title track of the latter also gained Sterbinszky moderate international exposure by its entry on the Billboard Dance charts. Having received an invitation from DJ Carl Cox, Sterbinszky had the opportunity to perform at Ibiza’s prestigious Space superclub in 2004.

In 2006, Sterbinszky started a musical collaboration with Hungarian producer/remixer Gábor Boros under the alias Sequence 11.

== Works ==
=== Albums (solo) ===
- 2000 Discography
- 2001 Gates of Mind
- 2003 Gates of Mind (modified re-release for international markets)

=== EP's ===
- 2000 DJ! Play The Music/Let's Do It!/Missed!/Ugly Dog! (12" promo)
- 2001 Gates Of Mind E.P. (12" promo)
- 2004 AXEtázis A Palaceban 4. (with Bruckmann feat. Johnny d'Ark)

=== Singles (solo) ===
- 2000 Discography/Immortal Sense
- 2000 Discography/Scorpion/Funk Express (12" promo)
- 2000 Fly Away (12" promo)
- 2000 1942/Fly Away With Me (feat. Náksi & Brunner)
- 2001 Gates of Mind (with Tranzident)
- 2002 Discography I, II
- 2002 Discography III, IV
- 2002 AXEtázis (with Tranzident)
- 2002 Floating/M.I.R.
- 2003 Budapest Parade/Discography I (with Bruckmann & Johnny d'Ark) [France]
- 2003 AXEtázis a Palaceban 3.
- 2004 Club Rotation (with Bruckmann)

=== DJ Mixes ===
- 1998 Hits From Club E-Play
- 1999 Egy Nyár a Flörtben...
- 1999 The House Sound of Dance Tuning Disco
- 1999 The Trance Sound of Dance Tuning Disco
- 2000 Megint Egy Nyár a Flörtben 1 (Trance)
- 2000 Megint Egy Nyár a Flörtben 2 (House)
- 2001 hypeROXYd 1 (House)
- 2001 hypeROXYd 2 (Trance)
- 2002 AXEtázis a Palaceban Vol. 1
- 2002 AXEtázis a Palaceban Vol. 2
- 2003 AXEtázis a Palaceban Vol. 3
- 2004 AXEtázis a Palaceban Vol. 4 (with D.Deejay)
- 2005 Martini Revival

=== Remixes ===
- Ladánybene 27: Mit Akarsz? '98 (Panic Trance)
- Jamie Winchester & Hrutka Róbert: It's Your Life (Long & Short Club Versions)
- Szekeres Adrienn : Futok a Szívem Után (Long & Short Club Versions)
- Didier Sinclair : Lovely Flight (Long & Short Remixes)
- Náksi and Brunner : Gyere Velem (Long & Short Grandiose Remixes)
- Betty Love : Kísérj El (Long Remix)
- Tiesto : Lethal Industry (Sterbinszky & Coddie Remix Parts 1 & 2)
- Mauro Picotto : Lizard (Sterbinszky Remix)
- Sequence 11 : Voyager (Sterbinszky Remix)
- Veca Janicsák: Kék Angyal (Sterbinszky Remix)
- Sergio Pereire & Tiff Lacey : Pandora Box (Sterbinszky Remix)
- Compact Disco: Without You (Sterbinszky Remix)
- Spencer & Hill : Who Knows (Sterbinszky Remix)
- DJ Flower : Jamaican Love (Sterbinszky Remix)
- DJ Pedro : Everybody Dance (Sterbinszky Remix)

=== Sequence 11 (side project) ===
Albums

- 2006 Sequence 11 Aka Sterbinszky - In Sequence Sunset

Singles

- 2007 Duality
- 2008 Flush
- 2009 Just My Kind
- 2010 Until We Meet Again (feat. Aliciya Angel)
- 2014 Dione
- 2014 Seasons
