= Tuberose (album) =

Studio album by Amanda Lear
- Released: 22 October 2021
- Genre: Pop; chanson
- Language: French; English; Italian
- Label: Boomlover
- Producer: Alain Mendiburu

Amanda Lear chronology
Let Me Entertain You (2016)	Tuberose (2021)

Tuberose is a studio album by French singer Amanda Lear, released in October 2021 by the independent label Boomlover.

== Background ==
The album was recorded at Studio Richer in Paris. It consists of downtempo acoustic covers of songs by Serge Gainsbourg, Charles Trenet and Georges Moustaki, among others. The material is performed primarily in French.

Tuberose was preceded by the dance single "More" in March 2021 which on the album appears in an acoustic version. "Le bel âge" and "Immortels" were then made available in September and October, respectively. The album entered the physical albums sales chart in France, but failed to chart on the French Top Albums 200.

== Track listing ==
1. "Strip-tease" (Alain Goraguer, Serge Gainsbourg) – 2:17
2. "Immortels" (Dominique Ané) – 4:22
3. "Mon écho" (Darko, Julien Doré) – 4:24
4. "Opium" (Charles Cachant, Guy d'Abzac) – 3:48
5. "Amandoti" (Giovanni Ferretti, Massimo Zamboni) – 2:53
6. "Le bel âge" (Barbara) – 2:47
7. "Il pleure dans mon coeur (Claude Debussy, Suite bergamasque L.75:III. Clair de lune)" (Claude Debussy, Paul Verlaine) – 4:08
8. "La mélancolie" (Christophe Miossec, Jean-Louis Piérot) – 3:54
9. "Ma solitude" (Georges Moustaki) – 2:56
10. "I Wish You Love (Que reste-t-il de nos amours?)" (Charles Trenet, Léo Chauliac, Albert Beach) – 2:04
11. "More" (Acoustique) (Norman Newell, Riz Ortolani) – 2:11
12. "(Have I Stayed) Too Long at the Fair?" (Billy Barnes) – 2:53

== Chart performance ==
Chart (2021)	Peak position
France (Physical Albums)	147

== Release history ==
Date	Region	Format	Label
22 October 2021	Worldwide	CD, digital, streaming	Boomlover
