= The Sphinx (song) =

Single by Amanda Lear

from the album Never Trust a Pretty Face
- B-side: "Hollywood Flashback"
- Released: 1978
- Recorded: 1978
- Genre: Disco
- Length: 4:25
- Label: Ariola
- Songwriters: Anthony Monn, Amanda Lear
- Producer: Anthony Monn

Amanda Lear singles chronology
| "Lili Marleen" (1978) | "The Sphinx" (1978) | "Fashion Pack" (1979) |

Music video
- "The Sphinx" on YouTube

"The Sphinx" is a song by French singer Amanda Lear released in 1978 by Ariola Records as the single from her third album Never Trust a Pretty Face.

== Song information ==
The song was composed and produced by Anthony Monn, and marked a change in Lear's repertoire as her first downtempo disco ballad. The melancholic Lear-penned lyrics, in which the singer compares herself to the mythical Sphinx, tell about "the desire to remain a mystery". The singer has reflected that "The Sphinx" is the best song she wrote.

"The Sphinx" was released as the advance single from the singer's third studio album Never Trust a Pretty Face in late 1978. The single B-side was "Hollywood Flashback", the closing track on her previous album, Sweet Revenge. The song was a moderate chart success, reaching the top 20 across Europe, and remains one of Lear's biggest hits of the disco era.

Lear re-recorded the song for the 1998 album Back in Your Arms, and included the new version on her greatest hits compilation Forever Glam! in 2005.

== Track listing ==
- 7" Single

A. "The Sphinx" – 4:25
B. "Hollywood Flashback" – 4:31

- 12" Single

A. "The Sphinx" – 5:13
B. "Hollywood Flashback" – 4:31

== Chart performance ==
| Chart (1978–79) | Peak position |
|---|---|
| Belgium | 18 |
| France | 48 |
| Germany | 19 |

== Cover versions ==
- In 2015, Chilean-American musician Promis released a cover of the song on his collaboration album Sunset Blvd with producer Ian Matthews. The song was released as the single in spring 2016.
