= Ritmo Salsa =

Single by Amanda Lear
- B-side: "Hotel Palace"
- Released: 1984
- Recorded: 1984
- Genre: Pop
- Length: 3:47
- Label: Five Record
- Songwriters: Cristiano Malgioglio, Amanda Lear, Stefano Gori, Layter
- Producers: Cristiano Malgioglio, Alberto Radius

Amanda Lear singles chronology
| "Assassino" (1984) | "Ritmo Salsa" (1984) | "No Credit Card" (1985) |

"Ritmo Salsa" is a song by French singer Amanda Lear released in 1984 by Five Record.

== Song information ==
The song was written by Amanda Lear and Italian composers Cristiano Malgioglio, Stefano Gori and Marcello "Layter" Scichilone. It is an uptempo pop track with minor latin and rock elements, arranged by Alberto Radius of Italian band Formula 3, and produced by Malgioglio and Radius.

"Ritmo Salsa" was the theme song of Italian TV show W le donne which Amanda started hosting in October 1984 on Canale 5. It played during end credits in the first season of the show. The single was released by Five Record in Italy only, with the English-Italian song "Hotel Palace" on side B. The cover photo of the single was taken by Amanda's then-husband, Alain-Philippe Malagnac.

== Music video ==
The music video pictures Amanda dancing and performing the song in the studio, sporting different costumes and wigs.

== Track listing ==
- 7" Single

A. "Ritmo Salsa" – 3:47
B. "Hotel Palace" – 3:36
