= Assassino =

Single by Amanda Lear
- B-side: "Stato d'allarme"
- Released: 1984
- Genre: Pop
- Length: 4:05
- Label: WEA, Polydor
- Songwriters: Cristiano Malgioglio, Amanda Lear, Mauro Lusini, Luigi Lopez
- Producers: Cristiano Malgioglio, Alberto Radius

Amanda Lear singles chronology
| "Bewitched" (1983) | "Assassino" (1984) | "Ritmo Salsa" (1984) |

"Assassino" (Italian for "Killer" or "Murderer") is a song by French singer Amanda Lear released in 1984 by WEA.

== Song information ==
The song was written by Amanda Lear and Italian composers Cristiano Malgioglio, Mauro Lusini and Luigi Lopez. It is an uptempo pop track, arranged by Alberto Radius of Italian band Formula 3, and produced by Malgioglio and Radius. The song was recorded in both Italian and English. On the 7" single, the original Italian version was released, backed with "Stato d'allarme", a song penned by the same Amanda Lear with Corrado Castellari and Cristiano Malgioglio. The English-language version was only available in the extended 6-minute version on the 12" single.

"Assassino" was Lear's first post-Ariola single. It was released by WEA Italiana (a label of Warner Music Group) in most countries, and by Polydor Records in France. Despite promotion on TV and a high-profile music video, the single was not a chart success.

The song was not available on an album until 2005's greatest hits collection Forever Glam!. In 2010, both "Assassino" and its B-side "Stato d'allarme" were included on the mid-price compilation My French Italian Songbook. Both songs were mentioned as Lear's "noteworthy tracks" from the 80s in the 2017 book Europe's Stars of '80s Dance Pop.

== Music video ==
The music video was filmed to the English-language version of the song by Italian director Mauro Bolognini. It contains scenes of semi-nudity, with Amanda Lear briefly appearing topless.

== Track listing ==
- 7" Single

A. "Assassino" – 4:05
B. "Stato d'allarme" – 3:55

- 12" Single

A. "Assassino" – 6:02
B. "Assassino" (Instrumental) – 5:38
