= Paris by Night (song) =

Single by Amanda Lear
- Released: 2005
- Genre: Dance
- Length: 6:00 (full original version); 4:05 (edit)
- Label: Do It Yourself Entertainment, Dance Street
- Songwriters: Giovanbattista Giorgilli, Amanda Lear, Roberto Paesani

Amanda Lear singles chronology
"I Just Wanna Dance Again" (2002)	"Paris by Night" (2005)	"Copacabana" (2005)

"Paris by Night" is a song by French singer Amanda Lear released in 2005.

== Song information ==
"Paris by Night" is an uptempo dance song written by Giovanbattista Giorgilli, Amanda Lear, and Roberto Paesani. Its English-French lyrics invite to explore Parisian nightlife, and Lear herself offers to be the guide to the city. The lyrics name-check Folies Bergère and Champs-Élysées. The song was also recorded entirely in French as "Paris la nuit".

"Paris by Night" was originally released in Italy as a 14-track CD maxi single with multiple remixes by Italian DJs and producers. In Germany, it was released as a CD single as well as a limited edition picture disc (500 copies) with different artwork. The song was a minor chart hit in Italy where it peaked at no. 43. It also entered the radio airplay chart in Russia.

== Track listing ==
- CD Maxi-Single (2005)
1. "Paris by Night" (DIY Cool Edit) – 3:20
2. "Paris by Night" (DIY Elektro Edit) – 3:25
3. "Paris la nuit" (Union Boys Edit) – 3:23
4. "Paris la nuit" (Lab Short RMX) – 3:39
5. "Paris by Night" (Original Edit) – 4:05
6. "Paris la nuit" (Original French Edit) – 4:05
7. "Paris by Night" (DIY Cool Mix) – 6:17
8. "Paris by Night" (Bini's Virus Dub) – 6:33
9. "Paris by Night" (DIY Elektro Mix) – 5:18
10. "Paris la nuit" (Union Boys Extended) – 5:20
11. "Paris la nuit" (Lab Extended RMX) – 5:48
12. "Paris by Night" (Original Mix) – 6:00
13. "Paris la nuit" (Original French Mix) – 6:00
14. "Paris by Night" (Piol Paradise Remix) – 6:48
- 12" Single (Italy, 2005)

A1. "Paris by Night" (DIY Cool Mix) – 6:17
A2. "Paris by Night" (DIY Elektro Mix) – 5:18
B1. "Paris by Night" (Bini's Virus Dub) – 6:33
B2. "Paris by Night" (Piol Paradise Remix) – 6:48

- 12" Picture Disc (Italy, 2005)

A1. "Paris by Night" (Original Mix) – 6:02
A2. "Paris by Night" (Piol Paradise Remix) – 6:50
B1. "Paris by Night" (DIY Elektro Mix) – 5:20
B2. "Paris by Night" (DIY Cool Mix) – 6:19

- CD Maxi-Single (Germany, 2005)
1. "Paris by Night" (Original Edit) – 4:05
2. "Paris by Night" (DIY Cool Edit) – 3:25
3. "Paris by Night" (Bini's Virus Dub) – 6:33
4. "Paris by Night" (Original Mix) – 6:00
5. "Paris by Night" (Piol Paradise Remix) – 6:50

== Chart performance ==
Chart (2005)	Peak position
Italy (FIMI)	43
Russia (Tophit)	77
