= Never Trust a Pretty Face =

Studio album by Amanda Lear
- Released: 1979
- Recorded: September–December 1978
- Studio: Musicland, Munich, Germany
- Genre: Euro disco, pop
- Length: 39:25
- Language: English, French, German
- Label: Ariola
- Producer: Anthony Monn

Amanda Lear chronology
Sweet Revenge (1978)	Never Trust a Pretty Face (1979)	Diamonds for Breakfast (1980)

Professional ratings
Review scores
Source	Rating
AllMusic	4/5 stars

Never Trust a Pretty Face is the third studio album by French singer Amanda Lear, released by the West German label Ariola Records in 1979. The album included notable hit singles "The Sphinx" and "Fashion Pack (Studio 54)", and turned out a commercial and critical success.

== Background ==
After two successful albums, Lear was teamed up again with producer Anthony Monn to work on their next effort. Never Trust a Pretty Face was recorded between September and December 1978 at Musicland Studios in Munich, Germany, and released in early 1979. Most songs were composed by Monn, and all lyrics but one were written by Lear herself. Musically, the album was a combination of disco, which was at the peak of its popularity at that time, with other musical genres, such as rock on "Forget It", cabaret music on "Miroir" and electronica on "Black Holes" and "Intellectually". It also included a German-English dance version of a war-time classic "Lili Marleen" and a number of ballads, making it one of Lear's most diverse albums. The song "Black Holes" was dedicated to Salvador Dalí.

The promotional campaign for Never Trust a Pretty Face effectively continued to play on Lear's "devil in disguise" persona, portraying her as a mythological creature on the album cover, smiling innocently in the Egyptian desert with angel's wings and a snake's tail. The same image was reproduced on a giant 24"×36" fold-out poster which came with most European editions. The picture on the back cover of the album depicted Amanda dressed in a suit, complete with a bow tie, holding a cigarette, referencing Marlene Dietrich's classic gender-bending image.

The ballad "The Sphinx" was released as the lead single in the autumn 1978 to a considerable chart success. The second single was the upbeat disco track "Fashion Pack" which turned out moderately successful across Europe. "Lili Marleen" was released as a promotional single and charted in Italy.

In France, the album included a German-French language version of "Lili Marleen". For the UK release, the track listing was re-arranged and additionally included an edit of "Blood and Honey", a hit single from Lear's debut album. A picture disc edition was also released in the UK, containing "Blood and Honey", an English language recording of "Miroir" and an extended version of "Dreamer (South Pacific)". In Argentina, the album was released as Nunca confíes en una cara bonita. The record was a commercial success, performing best in France, where it reached the Top 10. It also placed within the Top 20 in Canadian Disco Albums Chart, being one of the very few Amanda Lear's releases to have charted on the North American continent. The album is now widely recognized as one of Lear's best works and holds the "Album Pick" status on AllMusic. Lear was also the fourth most popular female artist in Germany in 1979.

The rights to the Ariola-Eurodisc back catalogue are currently held by Sony BMG. Like most of Amanda's albums from the Ariola Records era, Never Trust a Pretty Face has not received the official CD re-issue, excluding Russian bootleg re-releases.

== Track listing ==
=== Original release ===
Side A

1. "Fashion Pack" (Anthony Monn, Amanda Lear) – 5:05
2. "Forget It" (Anthony Monn, Amanda Lear) – 4:10
3. "Lili Marleen" (Norbert Schultze, Hans Leip, Tommie Connor) – 4:40
4. "Never Trust a Pretty Face" (Anthony Monn, Amanda Lear) – 4:45

Side B

1. "The Sphinx" (Anthony Monn, Amanda Lear) – 4:20
2. "Black Holes" (Anthony Monn, Amanda Lear) – 5:00
3. "Intellectually" (Charly Ricanek, Amanda Lear) – 4:15
4. "Miroir" (Amanda Lear) – 2:00
5. "Dreamer (South Pacific)" (Rainer Pietsch, Amanda Lear) – 5:10

=== UK edition ===
Side A

1. "Fashion Pack" (Anthony Monn, Amanda Lear) – 5:05
2. "Forget It" (Anthony Monn, Amanda Lear) – 4:10
3. "Intellectually" (Charly Ricanek, Amanda Lear) – 4:15
4. "Blood and Honey" (Anthony Monn, Amanda Lear) – 3:10
5. "Never Trust a Pretty Face" (Anthony Monn, Amanda Lear) – 4:45

Side B

1. "The Sphinx" (Anthony Monn, Amanda Lear) – 4:20
2. "Black Holes" (Anthony Monn, Amanda Lear) – 5:00
3. "Lili Marleen" (Norbert Schultze, Hans Leip, Tommie Connor) – 4:40
4. "Miroir" (Amanda Lear) – 2:00
5. "Dreamer (South Pacific)" (Rainer Pietsch, Amanda Lear) – 5:10

=== UK picture disc ===
Side A

1. "Fashion Pack" (Anthony Monn, Amanda Lear) – 5:05
2. "Forget It" (Anthony Monn, Amanda Lear) – 4:10
3. "Intellectually" (Charly Ricanek, Amanda Lear) – 4:15
4. "Blood & Honey" (Anthony Monn, Amanda Lear) – 4:45
5. "Never Trust a Pretty Face" (Anthony Monn, Amanda Lear) – 4:45

Side B

1. "The Sphinx" (Anthony Monn, Amanda Lear) – 4:20
2. "Black Holes" (Anthony Monn, Amanda Lear) – 5:00
3. "Lili Marleen" (Norbert Schultze, Hans Leip, Tommie Connor) – 4:40
4. "Mirrors" (Amanda Lear) – 2:00
5. "Dreamer (South Pacific)" (Rainer Pietsch, Amanda Lear) – 5:58

== Personnel ==
- Amanda Lear – lead vocals
- Geoff Bastow – guitar
- Etienne Cap – brass
- Judy Cheeks – backing vocals
- Curt Cress – drums
- George Delagaye – brass
- Wolly Emperhoff – backing vocals
- Keith Forsey – drums
- Benny Gebauer – brass
- Günter Gebauer – bass guitar
- Les Hurdle – bass guitar
- Dave King – bass guitar
- Billy Lang – guitar
- Peter Lüdermann – sound engineer
- Renate Mauer – backing vocals
- Anthony Monn – record producer, Moog
- Ralf Nowy – musical arranger (tracks: A4, B1)
- Rainer Pietsch – musical arranger (track B5), backing vocals
- Walter Rab – brass
- Charly Ricanek – musical arranger (tracks: A1, A2, A3, B2, B3, B4), keyboards, Moog
- Jürgen Rogner – artwork
- Kristian Schultze – Moog
- Claudia Schwarz – backing vocals
- Giuseppe Solera – brass
- Denis Taranto – photography
- Eric Thöner – backing vocals
- Manfred Vormstein – art direction and concept

== Chart performance ==
=== Weekly charts ===
Chart (1979)	Peak position
Australia (Kent Music Report)	63
Canada (Disco Albums)	20
France	8
Germany	24
Sweden	20

=== Year-end charts ===
Chart (1979)	Peak position
France	51
Germany	74

== Release history ==
Year	Region	Format(s)	Label
1979	Germany	LP, cassette	Ariola Records
1979	Italy	LP, cassette	Ariola Records
1979	Spain	LP	Ariola Records
1979	Netherlands	LP	Ariola Records
1979	United Kingdom	LP	Ariola Records
1979	Colombia	LP	Ariola Records
1979	Argentina	LP	Ariola Records
1979	France	LP	Eurodisc
1979	Greece	LP	Epic Records
1979	Canada	LP	Epic Records
