= A L =

EP by Amanda Lear
- Released: 1985
- Recorded: 1985
- Genre: Pop
- Length: 11:07
- Languages: English, German
- Label: Five Records
- Producer: Gianfranco Intra

Amanda Lear chronology
Tam-Tam (1983)	A L (1985)	Secret Passion (1986)

A L is an EP by French singer Amanda Lear released in 1985 by Italian label Five Records.

== Background ==
A L was released by minor Italian label Five Records, closely related to Canale 5, when Lear was at the peak of her television career in Italy. The EP featured four cover versions of classic songs from the 1930s, 1940s and 1950s: "As Time Goes By" from movie Casablanca, the German language "Bel Ami" (originally titled "Du hast Glück bei den Frau'n, Bel Ami") from Willi Forst's 1939 film by the same name, "Bye Bye Baby", originally performed by Marilyn Monroe in Gentlemen Prefer Blondes in 1953, and "Magic Moments" by Burt Bacharach and Hal David, a 1958 hit for Perry Como.

No singles were released to promote the album, but all four songs were performed at popular Italian TV show W le donne which Amanda hosted at that time, starting with "As Time Goes By" in March 1985. A L was never released on CD in its entirety, but "As Time Goes By" and "Bye Bye Baby" were included on the 2005 compilation Forever Glam!.

== Track listing ==
Side A

1. "As Time Goes By" (Herman Hupfeld) – 3:21
2. "Bel Ami" (Theo Mackeben, McVivianir) – 2:06

Side B

1. "Bye Bye Baby"(Jule Styne, Leo Robin) – 3:00
2. "Magic Moments" (Burt Bacharach, Hal David) – 2:40

== Personnel ==
- Amanda Lear – lead vocals
- Alberta Ferretti – dress
- Gianfranco Intra – record producer, musical arranger
- Roberto Rocchi – photography
- Carlo Zini – artwork design

== Release history ==
Year	Region	Format(s)	Label
1985	Italy	LP, cassette	Five Records
