= Amanda Lear =

French singer, actress, television presenter

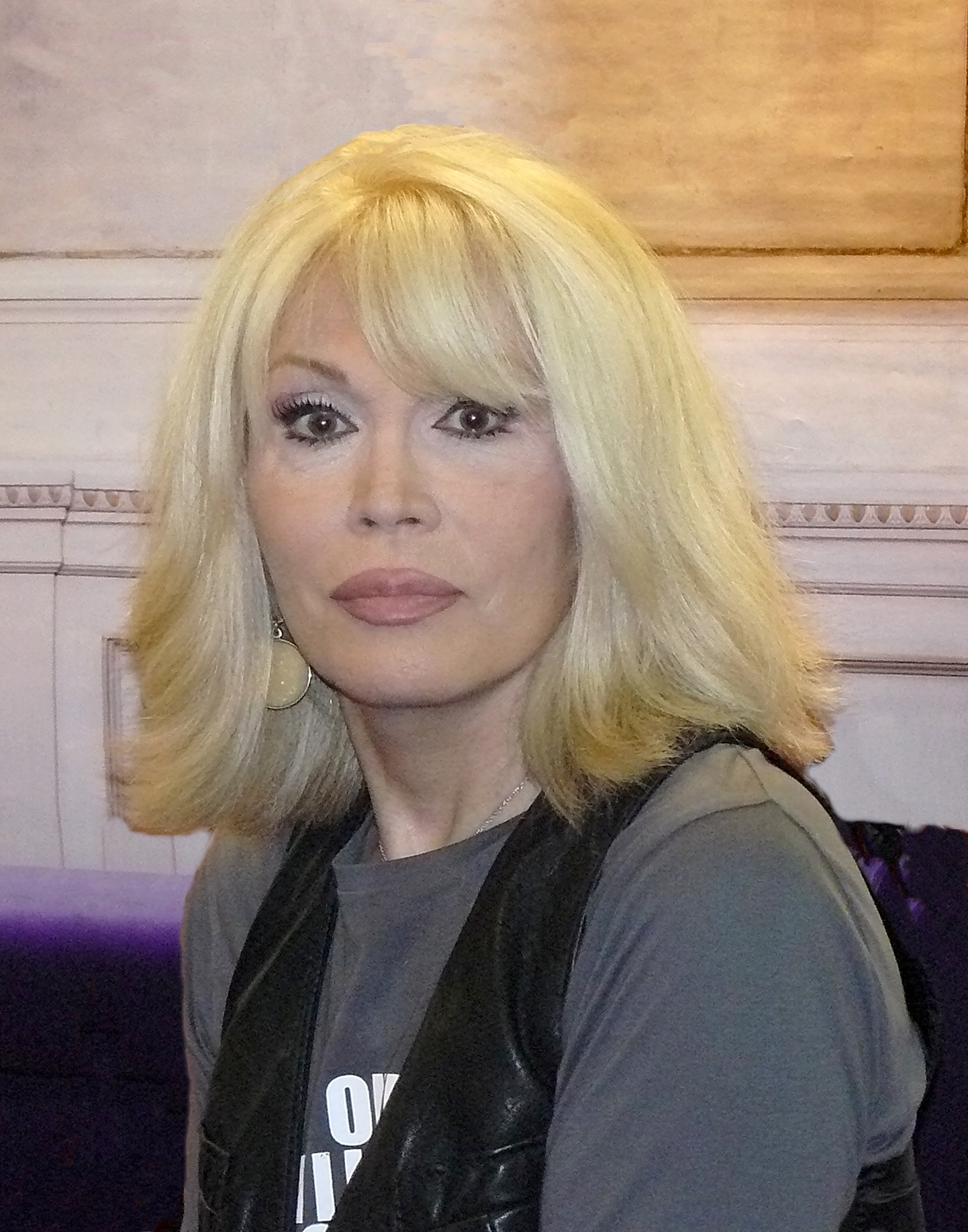
- Lear in 2010
- Born: Amanda Tap or Tapp c. 1939–50 (various dates given – see § Early life); Saigon, French Indochina (present-day Ho Chi Minh City, Vietnam) (Note: According to other sources, she was born in Hong Kong or Hanoi.)
- Occupations: Singer; songwriter; painter; television personality; actress; model
- Spouse: Alain-Philippe Malagnac (m. 1979; died 2000)
- Modeling information
- Height: 176 cm (5 ft 9 in)
- Hair color: Blonde
- Eye color: Brown
- Musical career
- Genres: Pop; dance; Euro disco; pop rock; new wave; Eurodance; jazz
- Instrument: Vocals
- Years active: 1965–present
- Labels: Ariola Records; Five Records; Carrere Records; Ricordi International; Chène Music; ZYX Music; Le Marais Productions; Edina Music; Just Good Music for Your Ears; Little Boom Records
- Website: www.amandalear.com

Amanda Lear (French pronunciation: [amɑ̃da liʁ]; née Tap or Tapp) is a French singer, songwriter, painter, television presenter, actress and former model.

She began her professional career as a fashion model in the mid-1960s and went on to model for Paco Rabanne, Ossie Clark and others. She met Spanish surrealist painter Salvador Dalí and remained his closest friend and muse for almost 20 years. Lear first came into the public eye as the cover model for Roxy Music's album For Your Pleasure in 1973. From the mid-1970s to the early 1980s, she was a million-album-selling disco star signed to Ariola Records, primarily impacting continental Europe and Scandinavia. Lear's first four albums earned her mainstream popularity, charting in the top 10 of European charts, including the best-selling Sweet Revenge (1978). Her bigger hits included "Blood and Honey", "Tomorrow", "Queen of Chinatown", "Follow Me", "Enigma (Give a Bit of Mmh to Me)", "The Sphinx", and "Fashion Pack".

By the mid-1980s, Lear had become a leading media personality in Italy, hosting many popular TV shows. Although television took priority over musical activity, she continued to record, experimenting with different genres and trying to revive her career by re-recording and remixing earlier hits to various levels of success. Lear has also developed a successful career in painting, which she has long described as her biggest passion, and regularly exhibited her works in galleries across Europe and beyond since the early 1980s. She has also written a number of books, including My Life with Dalí.

Since the 1990s, her time has been divided among music, television, movies and painting. Despite regular album releases, she failed to achieve major success in the charts with her music, but her television career has remained stellar and she has hosted numerous primetime TV shows, mostly in Italy and France, occasionally making guest appearances in TV series. She has performed acting and dubbing roles in independent as well as in major film productions. In the late 2000s, Lear reinvented herself as a theatrical actress, performing in long-running stage plays in France. To date, she allegedly has sold over 27 million records worldwide. Lear is also a widely recognized gay icon.

== Early life ==
Lear's origins are unclear, with the singer providing conflicting information about her background and maintaining privacy regarding her family life, including her actual birth date, even from her long-term husband Alain-Philippe. Contested facts include her birth date and place, her sex at birth, the names and nationalities of her parents and the location of her upbringing. Most sources claim 18 June 1939 (including Bibliothèque nationale de France) or 18 November 1939 (including GEMA) to be her birth date. Her birth year, though, has variously been given as 1941, 1946 and 1950. During a 2010 interview with French newspaper Libération, Lear presented her identity card to the journalist, which read: "born 18 November 1950 in Saigon". Georges Claude Guilbert claims, "Most biographers believe she was born in 1939, whatever she might declare to the contrary."

As for her birthplace, Saigon and British Hong Kong seemed to be the most credible, but Lear claimed origins in Singapore, Switzerland and even Transylvania. According to her book My Life with Dalí, she was the only child of her parents, who later divorced. Most sources, including Lear's 1965 wedding certificate from the Chelsea registry office, confirm that her father was a French army officer and that her surname at that time was Tap. According to the French Republic, her birth surname was Tapp. In a 1976 interview with Carmen Thomas for a German television show, Lear stated that her father was British, her mother was Russian and that they both had died. However, Lear later stated in a 1978 interview that she had a younger brother, her mother was Mongolian and they were both living together in a small town in the Pyrenees on the French-Spanish border. In 2021, she confirmed she was born in Saigon.

Lear allegedly grew up in the South of France and in Switzerland, or between London and Paris, or in Nice. She learned English, German, Spanish and Italian in her teens and would use multilingualism in her professional life. The academic Georges Claude Guilbert claims, "Linguists observe that she has a French accent when she speaks (and sings) in English".

The Guardian, on 23 December 2000, summarized the information relating to these aspects of Lear's life as follows:

Lear's background remains a mystery. She has variously let it be known that her mother was English or French or Vietnamese or Chinese, and that her father was English, Russian, French or Indonesian. She may have been born in Hanoi in 1939, or Hong Kong in either 1941 or 1946. Once she said she was from Transylvania. And to this day, it is a matter of conjecture as to whether she was born a boy or a girl.

== Career ==
=== 1965–1974: Modelling and the Swinging London period ===
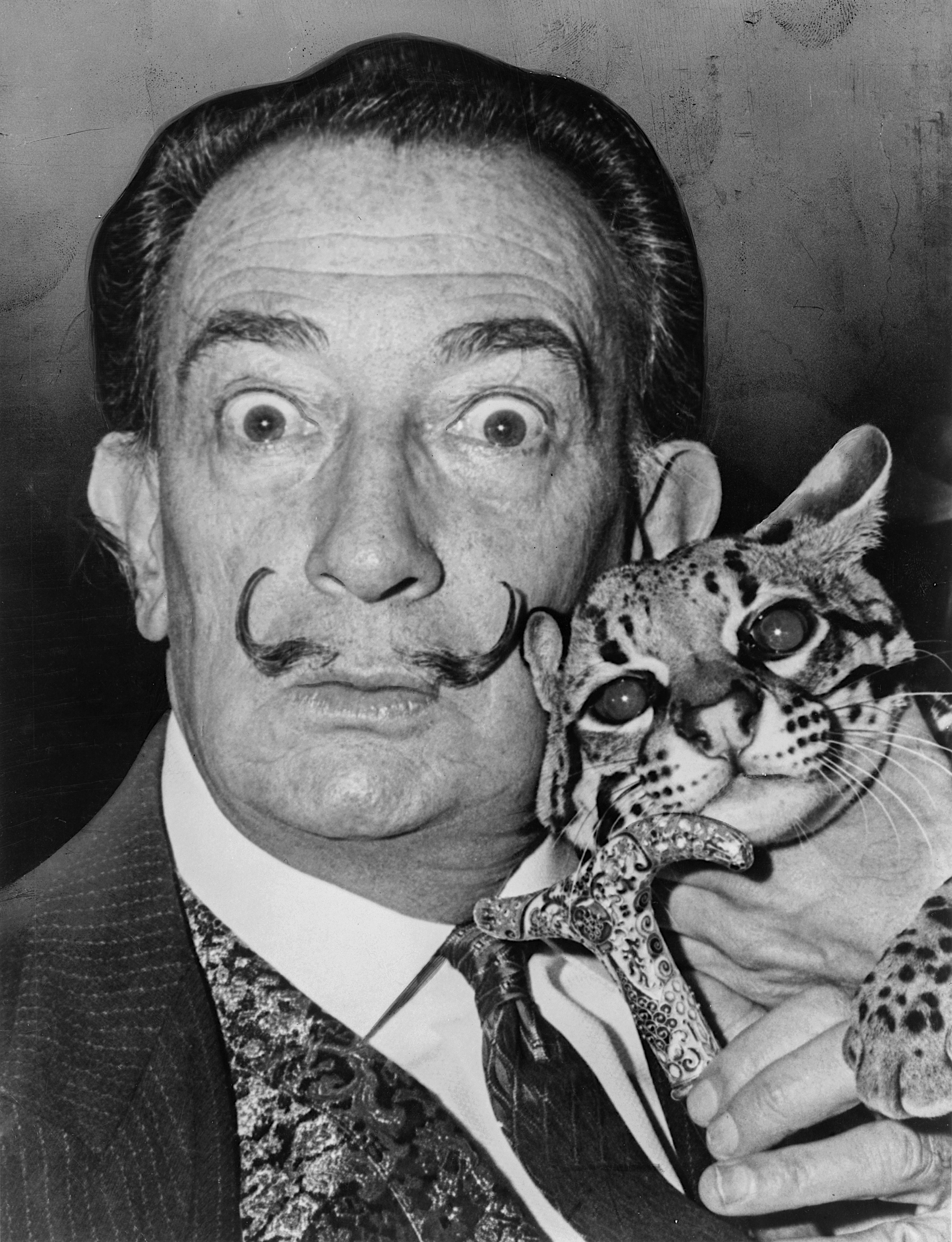
Salvador Dalí had a profound impact on Lear's painting career as well as her personal life.

Amanda Lear was introduced to the eccentric Spanish surrealist painter Salvador Dalí in Paris. She has since described their close and unconventional relationship as a "spiritual marriage" and remained Dalí's confidante, protégée and closest friend through the next 16 years. She spent every summer with Dalí at his home at Port Lligat in Catalonia, Spain, and accompanied him and his wife on trips to Barcelona, Madrid, Paris and New York. She also took part in his art projects, posing for a number of Dalí's drawings and paintings, including Angélus de Millet - Amanda (1968), Roger Freeing Angelica (St. George and the Damsel) (1970), Bateau Anthotropic (1971), and Exploding Head (1982). Dalí and Lear would later collaborate on a giant seven-foot-wide by four-foot-high collage fan. Lear can be found as Temperance in Salvador Dali's Tarot, in which she claimed to have assisted Dalí in the completion of the collages.

In 1965, Lear moved to London and began working as a cabaret artist. A July 1965 newspaper report about a robbery at her home described her as the strip-tease artist "Amanda Tapp, professionally known as Peki d'Oslo". An American newspaper described her in October 1965 as "one of the leading stripping stars on the European cabaret circuit".

On 11 December 1965 in the UK, she married Morgan Paul Lear, an architecture student, and adopted his name. After showing up at Lucie Daouphars' Parisian model school (known as Lucky), she was sent by Gérald Nanty to Karl Lagerfeld, then model maker at Patou. Amanda Lear was a runway model for Lagerfeld and met Catherine Harlé, the head of a modelling agency, who offered her a contract. With her modelling assignment, she walked for rising star Paco Rabanne in 1967. Just as Harlé had predicted, her looks were very much in demand. Soon after her debut Lear was photographed by Helmut Newton, Charles Paul Wilp and Antoine Giacomoni for magazines such as Beau (1966), mr. (1966), Le Nouveau Candide, Cinémonde (1967), Scandal, Marie France, Nova, The Daily Telegraph, Stern, Bravo and Vogue. She modelled for fashion designers including Yves Saint Laurent and Coco Chanel in Paris and Mary Quant, Ossie Clark and Antony Price in London. After some time, Lear dropped out of art school to model full-time and went on to lead a bohemian and flamboyant life in the Swinging London of the 1960s. Lear's acquaintances included the Beatles and fellow top models Twiggy, Pattie Boyd and Anita Pallenberg. In late 1966, she began dating the Rolling Stones' Brian Jones, whom she first met prior through Tara Browne. Pallenberg, cited as "Jones' mistress", also connected Lear with him. Their relationship inspired Mick Jagger and Keith Richards for the track "Miss Amanda Jones" from Between the Buttons, alluding the romance between Jones and Lear as she's described as "Ms. Jones". She became a "stalwart of London's demimonde", an exotic name on the nightclub circuit and a regular fixture in the gossip columns. Lear was arrested in 1967 by the police with drugs belonging to the Rolling Stones. Lear was sent naked to a prison cell "because you don't denounce a Rolling Stones", she said and was later fined for it. Lear appeared in several advertisements for major brands, modelling among others for a Chantelle underwear range and the Detchema fragrance by a French company Révillon Frères in 1967, and in 1968 played a minor role in the French comedy film Ne jouez pas avec les Martiens and also in the 1968 British psychedelic film Wonderwall. After Jones' death, Lear moved with hippie friends to Elvaston Place, South Kensington, in London. Lear recalled: "We smoked joints, took LSD, Jimi Hendrix came by when he had no place to sleep." In New York, Lear became a fixture at Max's Kansas City, partying every night with Andy Warhol and friends, to the point of neglecting some of her modelling duties, saying: "Do you even think I could have been ready and spotless by 8 A.M. as they wanted me to be ?"

In 1971, Lear modelled for a special Christmas issue of the French edition of Vogue, edited entirely by Salvador Dalí, and was photographed by David Bailey. She performed in a short-lived play along with the singer P.J. Proby in an Islington pub in London and 1972 saw her first on-stage appearance when she introduced Roxy Music and Lloyd Watson at the Rainbow Theatre in London in August. Lear also made a cameo appearance modelling in A Bigger Splash. Lear has been briefly engaged to Bryan Ferry of Roxy Music and was famously depicted posing in a skintight leather dress leading a black panther on a leash on the cover of the band's art rock album For Your Pleasure, released in March 1973, an image that has been described as "as famous as the album itself". After the release of For Your Pleasure, Lear appeared on stage at Camden Palace during Roxy Music concerts; "Freddie Mercury and Elton John thought I was great", she said. Later, Marianne Faithfull handed the phone to Lear: "It's David Bowie, he wants to talk to you." Lear first met Bowie at a dinner with Jagger and his wife Bianca, and then went to a Muhammad Ali boxing match shown at a cinema in Leicester Square. Lear thought Bowie was "weird with his red hair". Bianca "hated" Lear. Lear went on to have an affair with the married Bowie. However, Bowie's wife Angie supported Lear. Following the exposure to the music world she gained from the album cover, Lear appeared in the live performance of Bowie's hit song "Sorrow" in The 1980 Floor Show and was cast as the show's MC held in October 1973, broadcast in November 1973 as part of The Midnight Special TV series. Lear then contributed to the Dalí Museum, opened in the painter's home town Figueres in September 1974, by producing a series of collages decorating the doors of the museum, and was offered writing a monthly gossip column by the British magazine Tatler. Lear was also one of the four gossip columnists for Ritz Magazine.

=== 1974–1983: The disco period with Ariola Records ===
In 1974, disillusioned by a shallow and conservative fashion industry and encouraged by her boyfriend Bowie, who paid for singing and dancing lessons, Lear decided to launch a career in music. Bowie recommended a Hungarian voice coach Florence Wiese-Norberg, with whom he also worked, and the pair subsequently recorded a demo track called "Star", which remains unreleased to date. Lear's debut single, "Trouble", a pop-rock cover of Elvis Presley's 1958 classic, was released unsuccessfully by minor label Creole Records in the United Kingdom. A French-language version of the track, "La Bagarre", was released on Polydor in France and while equally unsuccessful there, it became a minor disco hit in West Germany in early 1976. The track caught the attention of the singer, composer and producer Anthony Monn and label Ariola, which offered her a seven-year, six-album recording contract for a sum of money that Lear since has described as "astronomic". Her debut album, I Am a Photograph, released in 1977, was recorded in Munich with most songs composed by Monn who later produced majority of her material in the disco era. The album included Lear's first European hit "Blood and Honey", as well as the follow-up Italian no. 1 single "Tomorrow", and covers of Nancy Sinatra's "These Boots Are Made for Walkin'" and Leroy Anderson's "Blue Tango". I Am a Photograph's mixture of lush disco, schlager, kitsch and camp, topped with Lear's deep half-spoken, half-sung vocals and her characteristic Franglais accent was a successful combination. The second edition of I Am a Photograph, which also contained German no. 2 hit "Queen of Chinatown", included a free pin-up poster with Lear posing topless, a photo originally featured in a Playboy spread. Lear allegedly had affairs with Keith Moon and Jimmy Page.

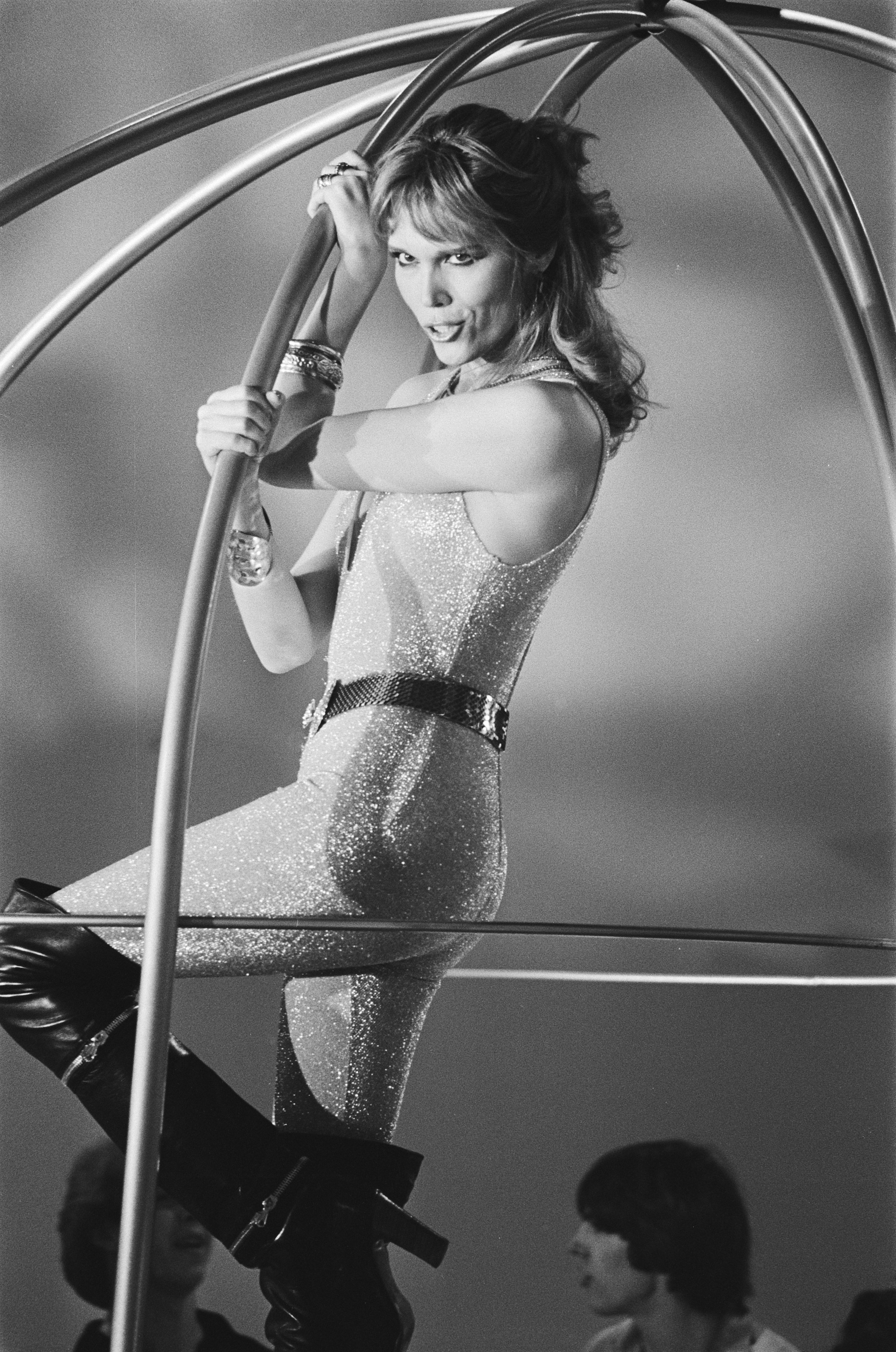
Lear performing in 1978 at the height of her singing career

In 1978, Lear continued her line of disco hits with Sweet Revenge, an album that opens with a concept medley about a Faustian fairy tale of a girl who sells her soul to the devil for fame and fortune, and in her eventual revenge over the devil's offer finds true love. The first single from Sweet Revenge, "Follow Me", powered by Lear's characteristic deep and recitative voice and the theme of the devil, was an instant smash hit. It reached the top 3 in the West German singles chart as well as the top 10 in many European countries, and has been Lear's signature tune ever since. The Sweet Revenge album was certified gold in West Germany and France, and went on to sell in excess of four million copies, spawning further European hit singles "Gold" and "Enigma (Give a Bit of Mmh to Me)". Lear took part in three Italian productions in 1978: a war-time parody Zio Adolfo in arte Führer, a softporn documentary Follie di notte directed by Joe D'Amato, and a six-episode controversial TV show Stryx. Later in 1978, Lear and Monn teamed for Never Trust a Pretty Face. The album featured a variety of genre exercises like the dance version of a war-time classic "Lili Marleen", the interpersonal ballad "The Sphinx", the cabaret-esque "Miroir", futuristic tracks "Black Holes" and "Intellectually", as well as the hit disco single "Fashion Pack (Studio 54)".

In late 1978, at a fashionable Parisian discothèque Le Palace, a French equivalent of Studio 54, Amanda Lear met French aristocrat Alain-Philippe Malagnac d'Argens de Villèle, the former lover and then adopted son of diplomat and controversial novelist Roger Peyrefitte. She married him on 13 March 1979, while on a trip to the United States. The marriage lasted 21 years, until Malagnac's death on 16 December 2000, when he was killed by smoke in a fire at their farmhouse in Saint-Étienne-du-Grès. He died just six weeks after Peyrefitte.

This marriage is not official for the French state. Dalí and his wife Gala both strongly disapproved of the relationship and attempted to persuade Lear to have the marriage annulled. As a consequence of this, and also the time taken up by Lear's successful career in music and television, she and her mentor began drifting apart. They sporadically kept in touch via letters and telephone through the early and mid-1980s, especially after Gala's death in 1982. Lear visited Dalí one last time at Púbol, Spain, a few years before the painter died.

In the early '80s, she had her first art exhibition in Paris. According to Lear, it happened in 1979.

In late 1979, Lear recorded Diamonds for Breakfast, which was her commercial breakthrough in the Scandinavian market (top 10 in both Sweden and Norway), producing hits "Fabulous (Lover, Love Me)" and "Diamonds", plus regional single releases "Japan", "When" and the autoerotic "Ho fatto l'amore con me". The album abandoned the Munich disco sound with its lush strings and brass arrangements in favour of an electronic new wave rock style. Lear spent most of 1980 on European promotional tours for the album and its many accompanying single releases, from Greece to Finland. She also made her first visit to Japan, where both the single "Queen of Chinatown" and the Sweet Revenge album had charted. Two non-album singles followed the Diamonds for Breakfast album in late 1980: a pop cover of Eric "Monty" Morris's early ska hit "Solomon Gundie" and the chanson-esque "Le Chat de gouttière", the latter with both music and lyrics written by Lear and recorded for francophone markets.

The Lear/Monn album success saga neared its end in 1981 when Lear had become increasingly uncomfortable with the expectations and pressures of the music business in general and her own record label in particular. At the artistic and commercial peak of her international career, but with the so-called "anti-disco backlash" beginning to take its toll, she had tentatively started recording tracks for a forthcoming album with producer Trevor Horn in London. However, Ariola did not approve of the material and informed Lear that she was to return to Munich and provide the company and the market with another Monn product. The result of these sessions was Incognito, only partly co-written by Lear, with new wave material fueled with rock and electronic elements. Incognito generated only one minor hit, the French language ballad "Égal", and still met with relative success in Scandinavia. It was also her breakthrough album in South America, with three tracks recorded in Spanish: "Igual", "Dama de Berlin", and "Ninfomanía". Another non-album single followed in early 1982, a synthpop take on the pop classic "Fever". This was Lear's final collaboration with producer Anthony Monn. Shortly thereafter, she took legal action against the Ariola label on the grounds of artistic differences to be released from her recording contract. The lawsuit was unsuccessful, and she remained with Ariola until the end of 1983, as stipulated in the original contract. In 1982, another Italian language single, the ballad "Incredibilmente donna", was released on the greatest hits compilation Ieri, oggi.

The double A-side single "Love Your Body"/"Darkness and Light", released in the spring of 1983, was produced by Monn's sound engineer Peter Lüdemann rather than Monn. These were Lear's final Munich recordings for Ariola and her final promotional appearance on West Germany's most important music TV show at the time, Musikladen, in June 1983. Lear's international career momentum was slowing and effectively ended in December 1983 with her sixth and final Ariola album under contractual obligation. Tam-Tam, a collaboration with Italian composers and producers, was a modern and minimalist early 1980s synthpop album with a soundscape dominated by Roland TR-808 drum machines and sequencer-programmed synthesizers. Lear again wrote all the English lyrics for the album. Although she performed some of the songs from the album on the popular Italian TV show Premiatissima, she did not promote Tam-Tam in West Germany or any other parts of Europe and neither did the record company. As a consequence, Tam-Tam passed by unnoticed by the international record-buying public.

=== 1983–1999: Television career and comeback attempts ===
Lear launched a very successful and lucrative career as a TV presenter in Italy, thanks to the future prime minister Silvio Berlusconi, soon becoming a household name in that country. She hosted many successful TV shows there, including Premiatissima and W le donne (the latter adapted in France as Cherchez la femme), where she frequently promoted her music. The singer recorded a string of dance singles for various European labels: "Assassino" and "Ritmo Salsa" in 1984, followed by "No Credit Card" and "Women" in 1985. A mini album titled A L, with four covers of classic songs, including Marilyn Monroe's "Bye Bye Baby" and "As Time Goes By" from the film Casablanca, was recorded for Five Records and released in 1985. Her music career, however, had waned by that point, and she had failed to find chart success with her recordings at that time. In late 1985, Lear appeared in a series of TV spots for Fiat. She had written her first book, the autobiography My Life with Dalí, about her long relationship with the famous painter. Originally published in French, the book was translated into other languages in the second half of the 1980s.

After several years as a TV entertainer in Italy on Canale 5 and France on La Cinq, Lear returned to music. Her next album, Secret Passion, a post-disco Hi-NRG affair produced by Christian De Walden, was recorded in Los Angeles and Rome for major French label Carrere Records. The album was to be her comeback in Continental Europe, Scandinavia, the Eastern Bloc, South America and Japan, as well as a breakthrough attempt in English-speaking countries. These were the only major markets that Lear had not conquered during the Ariola years. The launch was planned for January 1987, however, just before promotion began, Lear was seriously injured in a near-fatal car accident and took months to recover, unable to promote the record properly. Secret Passion's commercial success was less than hoped for, and the lead single "Wild Thing" was ultimately released in a few countries such as France, Italy and Greece. While in hospital, Lear began writing a novel, L'Immortelle, a surrealistic tale of the torments of a woman doomed to eternal youth and beauty. Watching everyone else grow older and eventually losing all her loved ones, the woman is still as beautiful but unable to stop the merciless passage of time.

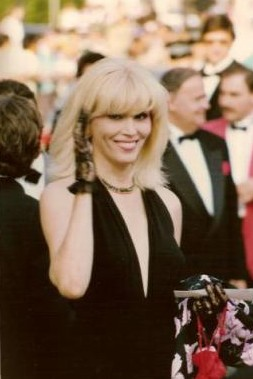
Lear at the Cannes Film Festival in 1990

A series of re-recordings of her old hits appeared on the market in the late 1980s, starting with a synthpop take of the biggest hit, "Follow Me", in 1987. The following year, Italian band CCCP Fedeli alla linea recorded a cover of her song "Tomorrow", retitled "Tomorrow (Voulez-vous un rendez-vous)", for which Lear contributed guest vocals. The single was a minor hit in Italy and Amanda's first chart success in that country in six years. In 1989, DJ Ian Levine remixed "Follow Me" and "Gold" in a Hi-NRG fashion, while Lear hosted Ars Amanda on Rai 3, an Italian chat show where she interviewed both Italian and international celebrities and politicians in bed. From the late 1980s, Lear has been a regular participant in the popular French radio show Les Grosses Têtes on RTL, televised on Paris Première. To maintain her popularity in Italy, she recorded Uomini più uomini, an all-Italian-language album, which included mainstream pop material written among others by Giorgio Conte, Paolo Conte's brother No single was released to promote the album and it turned out a commercial failure. The same year, Amanda re-recorded some of the songs in French and cut the dance single "Métamorphose" for the French-Italian re-release of the album Tant qu'il y aura des hommes. In 1990, she released an up-tempo, promotional-only single, "Do You Remember Me?" and took part in Thierry Mugler's fashion show.

Lear continued to record more dancefloor-friendly repertoire in the 1990s, starting with the 1992 song "Fantasy", which became a hit in European clubs. Cadavrexquis, her next album, was released in 1993 and featured heavily club-oriented material, including "Fantasy" and re-recordings of three songs from the disco era. Both the single and the album failed to enter any mainstream charts. Meanwhile, Lear hosted the TV show Méfiez-vous des blondes on TF1 and appeared in Arnaud Sélignac's TV drama Une Femme pour moi in France. In 1994, she modelled for the fashion house Grès in Paris and again for Thierry Mugler in Berlin the following year. In May 1995, Lear debuted her new, erotic late night TV show Peep! in Germany, also known as Beware of the Blondes, which she hosted for one year. The show, which used her song "Peep!" as the opening music theme, became remarkably popular in Germany, achieving over 50% of the market share. In June 1995, she performed at a 1970s disco music tribute concert La fièvre du disco in Paris alongside Boney M. and Gloria Gaynor In autumn, the singer released Alter Ego, an upbeat Eurodance offering. Again, the album was unsuccessful and did not produce any hits. As an active supporter of people suffering from HIV/AIDS, Lear made an appearance in 1996 as a model for Paco Rabanne during an annual charity event Life Ball. During her November 1996 concert at Le Palace in Paris, the singer announced her definitive departure from touring and performing live, and although she sporadically gave concerts in the following years, her live acts have been limited mostly to short TV appearances.

Lear released Back in Your Arms in Spring 1998, an album consisting of re-recordings of her own 1970s disco hits and remixed versions of tracks from the 1995 album Alter Ego. The album failed to make much impact on the market, but the re-recordings have been featured on many mid-price compilations in Europe. Back in Your Arms was re-released with a slightly different track list and title, and a remix of "Blood and Honey" was released as the single. Her next acting and television ventures were the French movie Bimboland, in which she starred alongside Gérard Depardieu, and an Italian makeover TV show Il brutto anatroccolo. The theme tune to the latter was "Nuda", a cover version of Melina Mercouri's 1960 recording "Never on Sunday", which Lear recorded but never released commercially. On the set of Il brutto anatroccolo Lear met model and actor Manuel Casella, some 30 years her junior. Lear and Casella began a long-term relationship and were featured prominently in the tabloid press in France and Italy, before splitting in 2008.

=== 2000–present: Recent career ===
Lear contributed vocals for a cover of Giorgio Moroder's 1970s hit "From Here to Eternity", recorded in 2000 with Eric D. Clark. In the morning of 16 December 2000, a fire broke out in Lear's house in Saint-Étienne-du-Grès, killing her husband Alain-Philippe, and his friend Didier Dieufis. At the time of the accident, Lear was in Milan, where she was hosting a TV show. The fire left the house in ruins, destroying personal memorabilia and a number of Dalí's paintings. As a result of the accident, she fell into depression, but soon returned to work and put on an art exhibition titled Not a. Lear. At the end of 2001, she returned with the album Heart, dedicated to the late husband. The album offered a cover of "Love Boat", the title song from the 1970s TV series of the same name, and the club-friendly track "I Just Wanna Dance Again", both issued as singles featuring remixes by some prominent names in the world of French dance music, such as Laurent Wolf and Junior Vasquez.

In 2002, Lear starred in Le Défi, a musical movie written and directed by choreographer Blanca Li about an 18-year-old dropout who dreams of becoming a star in breakdancing and the ensuing conflicts with his conservative mother. Lear played the mother's understanding and encouraging best friend. She cut the title song for her Italian TV show Cocktail d'amore in which she interviewed some of Italy's most famous 1980s music stars, and released the single "Beats of Love" with the Belgian boy band Get Ready! Both tracks were included in the 2003 re-release of Heart, retitled Tendance. Next year, Lear dubbed the voice of Edna Mode in the French and Italian versions of the Disney/Pixar's blockbuster The Incredibles, and her 1978 song "Enigma" enjoyed success in Central and Eastern Europe after exposure in the Kinder Bueno TV advert. In 2005, the singer became a judge on Ballando con le stelle, the Italian version of Dancing with the Stars, and released two dance singles, "Paris by Night" and the remake of Barry Manilow's "Copacabana", as well as two compilations, Forever Glam! and Sings Evergreens. In 2006, Lear opened an art exhibition in New York, titled Never Mind the Bollocks, Here's Amanda Lear, and was decorated with the Ordre des Arts et des Lettres by the French Minister of Culture Renaud Donnedieu de Vabres in recognition of her contributions to French arts and sciences. A compilation was released, the 3 CD The Sphinx – Das Beste aus den Jahren 1976–1983, fully covering the singer's Ariola output. In October, the album With Love was released in France. It won critical acclaim in France and was released in the rest of Europe in early 2007. Lear made several appearances in movies, including acting in Oliviero Rising and dubbing for the French version of Dragon Hunters. In 2008, she hosted several TV shows in Italy and France.

In 2009, Lear accepted the part of Cécile in the comedy Panique au ministère, which debuted at the Théâtre de la Porte Saint-Martin in Paris. The show turned out to be a huge success and was taken on tour. The same year, she dubbed the voice of Fish in the German movie Lacoma directed by Christopher Roth. Her next album Brief Encounters, was released in autumn 2009, preceded by the single "Someone Else's Eyes", a duet with Italian singer-producer Deadstar. The following month, Lear released the autobiography Je ne suis pas celle que vous croyez... (I am not who you think...) and the EP Brand New Love Affair. The title song was released as the lead single, accompanied by an animated music video. Brief Encounters was partly re-recorded and remixed and then released in Acoustique and Reloaded versions. Boy George remixed "Someone Else's Eyes" in 2010. In April 2011, Lear released the single "Chinese Walk", and joined the judging panel of the Italian TV show Ciak... si canta! on Rai 1. She dubbed the voice of Janet the Lioness in the French version of Zookeeper. In September, Lear returned to theatre for the lead role in Lady Oscar, an adaptation of Claude Magnier's 1958 play Oscar, at the Théâtre de la Renaissance in Paris. The play was another success and was taken on tour.

Her album I Don't Like Disco was released in January 2012, and the single "La Bête et la Belle" sparked controversy due to its erotic imagery. In September 2012, Lear appeared as a catwalk model on Jean Paul Gaultier's fashion show in Paris and in 2013 started playing the leading part in the play Divina at the Théâtre des Variétés in Paris. In Spring 2014, she released My Happiness, a tribute album with covers of Elvis Presley's songs, promoted by the single and video "Suspicious Minds". In 2015, she recorded the duet "Mai più" with Italian singer Gianluca De Rubertis for his album L'universo elegante. The pair then teamed for the ballad "Prima del tuo cuore" for Lear's next album Let Me Entertain You, released in May 2016. Her play La Candidate, a sequel to Panique au ministère, opened in 2016 at the Théâtre de la Michodière and was subsequently taken on tour across France. At the time of an interview in the Italian program Domenica in on 16 October 2016, Lear had planned a retirement immediately after completing the La Candidate tour in Spring 2017, however, she had to cancel a number of final dates due to health issues. In 2018, she worked on the dubbing for French and Italian versions of Incredibles 2, hosted the TV show Voulez-vous coucher avec moi ? on Cielo, and released another book, Délires. In 2019, Lear joined the judging panel of the Italian TV show Sanremo Young on Rai 1. In 2020, Lear starred in Si Muore Solo Da Vivi directed by Alberto Rizzi and in Miss directed by Ruben Alves. In 2021, she appears in TV drama Camping Paradis in France. In September, Lear returned to theatre to play Joan Crawford in Qu'est-il arrivé à Bette Davis et Joan Crawford ?, a play about Bette Davis and Joan Crawford in the war they fought on the set of What Ever Happened to Baby Jane? The play was directed by Michel Fau at the Théâtre de la Porte Saint-Martin in Paris.

She released a new album called Tuberose in 2021.

She is portrayed by Andreja Pejić in the film Dalíland, released in 2023.

The 2025 documentary Enigma compares and contrasts the life stories of April Ashley and Amanda Lear and includes a new interview with Lear conducted by the director Zackary Drucker. The interview focuses on Lear's own version of her personal history and gender identity, and how it contrasts with the accounts of her contemporaries. The film screened at the Sundance Film Festival in January 2025 and premiered on HBO Max in May.

== Gender identity ==
Rumors that Lear was a drag queen or intersex circulated from the beginning of Lear's modelling and singing careers. Her alleged transgender identity was commented on by Salvador Dalí himself and remarked upon in the media and in the biographies of those who knew Lear earlier in her life, including Dalí; author Ian Gibson devoted an entire chapter to Lear in his biography of Dalí.

April Ashley, a transgender entertainer and model, said that in the 1950s and early 1960s, Lear had worked with her in the Parisian transgender revues Madame Arthur and Le Carrousel de Paris. In her book April Ashley's Odyssey, Ashley recalls Lear performing drag acts under the stage name "Peki d'Oslo". Similar facts have been reported by Romy Haag, a transgender artist living in Germany, who ran the popular nightclub Chez Romy in Berlin and knew Lear.

Some sources say that Dalí sponsored Lear's sex reassignment surgery in Casablanca in 1963, carried out by Georges Burou and also that Dalí invented the stage name for her, a pun of the Catalan language "L'Amant de Dalí" ('Dalí's lover') ; this is contradicted by the fact that Lear's surname is a real one that she obtained by marrying Paul Morgan Lear, a young Scottish architecture student, in December 1965.

In 1978, Lear posed nude for Playboy.

French, British and Italian newspapers and magazines in the 1960s and 1970s and more recently in 2008 and 2011 and a 2016 article in La Stampa included alleged passport details and an alleged reproduction of a copy of Lear's birth certificate, which states that she was born and given a masculine name on 18 June 1939 in Saigon. The article included a picture which was alleged to be Lear before her supposed gender transition.

Despite Lear denying claims of being transgender on numerous occasions and explaining they were part of a strategy to draw public attention, the speculation persisted. In 1976, Lear stated that it was "a crazy idea from some journalist" and later claimed that the rumour had been started by Dalí or even herself.

== Discography ==
Studio albums and main compilations

- I Am a Photograph (1977)
- Sweet Revenge (1978)
- Never Trust a Pretty Face (1979)
- Diamonds for Breakfast (1980)
- Incognito (1981)
- Ieri, oggi (1982)
- Tam-Tam (1983)
- A L (1985)
- Secret Passion (1986)
- Super 20 (1989)
- Tant qu'il y aura des hommes (1989)
- Uomini più uomini (1989)
- The Collection (1991)
- Cadavrexquis (1993)
- Alter Ego (1995)
- Back in Your Arms (1998)
- Heart (2001)
- Tendance (2003)
- Forever Glam! (2005)
- Sings Evergreens (2005)
- The Sphinx – Das Beste aus den Jahren 1976–1983 (2006)
- With Love (2006)
- Brand New Love Affair (2009)
- Brief Encounters (2009)
- I Don't Like Disco (2012)
- My Happiness (2014)
- Let Me Entertain You (2016)
- Tuberose (2021)
- Looking Back (2025)

== Filmography ==
- Ne jouez pas avec les Martiens (1967)
- Wonderwall (1968)
- Follie di notte (1978)
- Loggerheads (1978)
- Grottenolm (1985)
- L'amour est à réinventer (1997)
- Bimboland (1998)
- La Défi (2002)
- Oliviero Rising (2007)
- Bloody Flowers (2008)
- 8th Wonderland (2010)
- Jodorowsky's Dune (2013)
- Metti una notte (2017)
- Miss (2020)
- Si muore solo da vivi (2020)
- Maison de retraite 2 (2024)
- To Live, To Die, To Live Again (Vivre, mourir, renaître) (2024)
- Enigma (2025, biographical documentary)

== Theater ==
- 2009-2011 : Panique au ministère written by Jean Franco & Guillaume Mélanie, directed by Raymond Acquaviva
- 2011-2013 : Lady Oscar written by Guillaume Mélanie, directed by Éric Civanyan
- 2013-2014 : Divina written by Jean Robert-Charrier, directed by Nicolas Briançon
- 2016-2017 : La Candidate written by Jean Franco & Guillaume Mélanie, directed by Raymond Acquaviva
- 2021-2022 : Qu'est-il arrivé à Bette Davis et Joan Crawford ? written by Jean Marboeuf, directed by Michel Fau
- 2024 : The Scientific Cardplayer written by Jean Franco & Guillaume Mélanie, directed by Raymond Acquaviva

== Books ==
- 1984 : Lear, Amanda (1984). Le Dalí d'Amanda (in French). Lausanne: Éditions Favre. ISBN 2-8289-0175-0. OCLC 461749441. (autobiography)
- 1987 : Lear, A (1987). L'Immortelle (in French). Paris: Claude Carrère. ISBN 2868043631. OCLC 461837831. (novel)
- 1994 : Lear, A (1994). L'Amant Dalí : ma vie avec Salvador Dalí (in French). Paris: Éditions Michel Lafon. ISBN 2840980118. OCLC 807550048. (reprint of Le Dalí d'Amanda, with a foreword by Paco Rabanne)
- 2004 : Lear, A (2004). Mon Dalí (in French). Neuilly-sur-Seine: Éditions Michel Lafon. ISBN 2749901111. OCLC 56012321. (reprint of Le Dalí d'Amanda)
- 2006 : Lear, A; Galerie Claudius (2006). Between dream and reality. Norderstedt: Books on Demand. ISBN 9783833451850. OCLC 180929230. (collected arts)
- 2009 : Lear, A (2009). Je ne suis pas du tout celle que vous croyez… (in French). Paris: Hors collection. ISBN 9782258081321. OCLC 468417957. (autobiography)
- 2018 : Lear, A; Dieudonné, Frédéric (2018). Délires (in French). Paris: Le Cherche midi. ISBN 9782749150437. OCLC 1078361743. (collection of meditations and anecdotes)

== In popular culture ==
- Lear was romantically linked to Brian Jones, which resulted in the ironic Rolling Stones track "Miss Amanda Jones" on the 1967 album Between the Buttons.
- Character Patsy Stone from the UK TV series Absolutely Fabulous was partly modeled on Amanda Lear.
- Italian band Baustelle dedicated their 2016 song "Amanda Lear" to her.
- In the biographical film Dalíland, Amanda Lear is played by the model and actress Andreja Pejić.
- In 2023 Amanda Lear's hit "Follow Me" plays as soundtrack for Chanel's Coco Mademoiselle commercial.
- Her song "Enigma (Give a Bit of Mmh to Me)" is used in a 2024 commercial for tails.com dog food.

== Bibliography ==
- Cann, Kevin (2010). David Bowie – Any Day Now – The London Years: 1947–1974. Bicester: Adelita. ISBN 978-0-95520-177-6. OCLC 1020536375. Archived from the original on 12 September 2017.
- Fallowell, Duncan; Ashley, April (1982). April Ashley's Odyssey. London, UK: Jonathan Cape. ISBN 0224018493. LCCN 82145047. OCLC 9491739. Archived from the original on 18 November 2019.
- Gibson, Ian (1997). The Shameful Life of Salvador Dali. New York: W. W. Norton. ISBN 0393046249. OCLC 1074378942. Gibson.
- Haag, Romy; Schacht, Martin (1999). Eine Frau und mehr (in German). Berlin: Quadriga. ISBN 3886793281. OCLC 47260127.
- Lear, Amanda (1985). My Life with Dalí. London, UK: Virgin Books. ISBN 0-86369-095-5.
- Quin, Élisabeth (2007). Bel de nuit, Gérald Nanty (in French). Paris: Éditions Grasset. ISBN 9782246693413. OCLC 470792050.
