= Fashion Pack =

- Artwork for French vinyl release

Single by Amanda Lear

from the album Never Trust a Pretty Face
- Released: 1979
- Recorded: 1978
- Genre: Euro disco
- Length: 5:05
- Label: Ariola, Epic
- Songwriters: Anthony Monn, Amanda Lear
- Producer: Anthony Monn

Amanda Lear singles chronology
"The Sphinx" (1978)	"Fashion Pack" (1979)	"Fabulous (Lover, Love Me)" (1979)

"Fashion Pack" (also known as "Fashion Pack (Studio 54)") is a song by French singer Amanda Lear from her third album Never Trust a Pretty Face, released in 1979 by Ariola Records.

== Song information ==
The song was composed and produced by Lear's long-time collaborator, Anthony Monn. Musically, it showcases mainstream disco sound, which in the second half of the 1970s was at the peak of its popularity. The lyrics, written by Amanda Lear, focus on positive aspects of fame and capture the eminence of the Manhattan-based nightclub Studio 54 at the time – hence the subtitle added on the single cover. Name-checked are some of its most famous attendees, such as Andy Warhol, Margaux Hemingway, Francesco Scavullo, Liza Minnelli, Bianca Jagger and Paloma Picasso. The song references the fashion and celebrity magazines Vogue, Women's Wear Daily, Interview and Ritz, as well as such activities as "travolting", "sniffing" and travelling by Concorde. The second verse of the song tells about Paris and its trendy venues Maxim's, Le Palace and Chez Régine. It also references the names of famous French fashion designers Yves Saint Laurent and Loulou de la Falaise.

"Fashion Pack" was released as the single in 1979 to promote Lear's third studio album, Never Trust a Pretty Face, heavily edited from its original album length of 5:05. The B-side was "Black Holes" on most single releases, "Lili Marleen" in Italy and Japan, "Intellectually" in Canada, and "Forget It" in Russia. "Fashion Pack" was heavily promoted by TV performances and reached the top 40 in charts across Europe. The song remains one of Lear's biggest hits of the disco era.

The singer has re-recorded "Fashion Pack" three times in the later years, first for the 1993 dance comeback album Cadavrexquis. To reflect changing fashions, the new, updated lyrics replaced most names from the original version with artists and designers more relevant to the early 1990s, such as Naomi Campbell, Madonna, Jean-Paul Gaultier, Thierry Mugler and Vanessa Paradis. Any references to the 1970s disco era are also removed and Studio 54 is replaced with the word "discothèque".

In 1998, Lear released a new version of the song on the album Back in Your Arms, which mostly consisted of re-recordings of her classic hits. That version retained the subtitle "Studio 54", the characteristic disco arrangement and most of the original lyrics, adding only Claudia Schiffer and Sylvester Stallone. In 2016, she recorded another version for the album Let Me Entertain You. The lyrics included names from first two versions and added Joe Dallesandro, Kate Moss, Chanel and Dior, also mentioning Paris Fashion Week, the magazine Vanity Fair and Instagram.

== Track listing ==
- 7" Single

A. "Fashion Pack" – 4:24
B. "Black Holes" – 5:00

- Italian 7" Single

A. "Fashion Pack" – 4:27
B. "Lili Marleen" – 4:45

- Japanese 7" Single

A. "Fashion Pack" – 3:37
B. "Lili Marleen" – 4:40

- Soviet 7" Single

A. "Реклама вокруг нас" ("Fashion Pack") – 5:05
B. "Забудь это" ("Forget It") – 4:10

- Canadian 7" Single

A. "Fashion Pack" – 3:29
B. "Intellectually" – 3:40

- 12" Single

A. "Fashion Pack" – 5:05
B. "Black Holes" – 5:00

- Italian 12" Single

A. "Fashion Pack" – 5:09
B. "Lili Marleen" – 4:45

== Chart performance ==
Chart (1979)	Peak position
Belgium (Ultratop 50 Flanders)	27
France (IFOP)	35
Netherlands (Single Top 100)	50
Sweden (Sverigetopplistan)	13
West Germany (GfK)	24

== Cover versions ==
- "Fashion Pack" was performed by Louise English and Sue Upton during the "Madame Louise Summer Collection" segment of the March 5, 1980 edition of The Benny Hill Show.
- Italian singer Anna Clementi covered the song on her 2012 album Fräulein Annie.
