= Turn Me On (Sean Smith song) =

Single by Sean Smith
- Released: 23 September 2016
- Genre: Pop
- Length: 3:15
- Label: Energise Records
- Songwriters: Christian Ingebrigtsen; Nalle Ahlstedt
- Producer: Nalle Ahlstedt

Sean Smith singles chronology
"Turn Me On" (2016)	"Magic" (2017)

Music video
- "Turn Me On" on YouTube

"Turn Me On" is the debut solo single by British singer Sean Smith. It was written by Christian Ingebrigtsen of the British–Norwegian pop group a1 and Nalle Ahlstedt (who also produced it). The track was released on 23 September 2016 through Energise Records. It became the label's fastest selling physical single, and the music video amassed over 26,000 views in its first 3 weeks of release. The remix EP which featured a remix by Paul Varney reached number 15 on the UK iTunes dance album chart.

== Recording ==
The track was originally offered to Nathan Moore who turned it down. Smith recorded the vocals on 27 June 2016 at the Select Recording Studios in London. Paul Miles was the vocal engineer. Also in the studio that day were the Energise label boss Gary Simmons and Smith's management Stefan Pellett and Karen Haggerty.

== Critical response ==
The Huffington Post reported "It seems Sean has been putting in some serious hours down the gym in preparation the release of his new material, revealing the results of his workouts on his new single cover. Calvin Harris, eat your heart out."

Guys Like U quoted: "Wow! Will you look at this foxy fella with that glossy tan, those rippling muscles and that handsome face… Where the hell has this dreamy Adonis suddenly sprung from, eh? Er, hang on a minute, isn't that….? No, it can't be… But yes, it bloody well is. It's only Sean Smith from legendary X Factor band Same Difference! Wahoo! When did this happen?."

== Chart performance ==
The remix EP reached number 15 on the UK iTunes dance album chart.

== Music video ==
The video was a filmed in a one-day shoot, in Brighton, by Proper Charlie Productions. Lee Cooper was the video director. Scott Norton was the choreographer who also appeared in the video.

=== Release and reception ===
The video was released by Dan Wootton of The Sun, as an exclusive through his Facebook page, on 16 September 2016.

An Andy Sikorski remix video was released on 23 September 2016.

The Daily Express headline read "Remember X Factor's Same Difference? Bizarre S&M, threesomes and gay kiss in new video".

Jonathan Currinn on his site Critic Jonni commented "The party is in full swing, though. Strip poker definitely gives us something to watch, and of course, see all the fitness Sean Smith has been up to recently. Not only that but there are half-naked girls having a pillow fight on the bed, as well as the passing of the strawberry. Kudos for having a guy pass the strawberry to another guy rather than it all being guy-girl action."

Digital Spy led with the headline "Remember Same Difference? Well, Sean has got a sexed-up new solo single and music video".

OK Magazine led with the headline "Same Difference's Sean Smith ditches family-friendly image in raunchy comeback music video".

== Remixes ==
The remix EP was released on 30 September 2016 and featured remixes by Paul Varney and Andy Sikorski.

== Live appearances ==
On 2 September 2016, Smith was interviewed on This Morning with his sister Sarah. Rylan Clark told viewers Smith had a new single coming out. He did numerous radio interviews for the single including an interview on Gaydio Radio on 15 September 2017.

On 17 November 2016, Smith performed the single live for the first time at the Portsmouth Christmas Lights switch on. He performed the song at the James Bulger Black Tie & Tiara Ball in Liverpool on 18 March 2017. On 3 June 2017, he performed a live set at Oxford Pride which included "Turn Me On".

== Formats and track listings ==
UK CD single

1. "Turn Me On (Album Version)" – 3:15
2. "Turn Me On (Andy Sikorski Edit)" – 3:21
3. "Turn Me On (Sub City Remix)" – 3:41
4. "Turn Me On (Extended Version)" – 4:30
5. "Turn Me On (Andy Sikorski Club Mix)" – 4:38
6. "Turn Me On (Instrumental)" – 3:15

Digital single

1. "Turn Me On (Album Version)" – 3:15

"Turn Me On - The Remixes" digital release

1. "Turn Me On (Andy Sikorski Club Mix)" – 4:38
2. "Turn Me On (Extended Version)" – 4:30
3. "Turn Me On (Sub City Remix)" – 3:41
4. "Turn Me On (Andy Sikorski Edit)" – 3:21
5. "Turn Me On (Andy Sikorski Dub Mix)" – 4:41
