= Magic (Sean Smith song) =

Single by Sean Smith
- Released: 26 May 2017
- Genre: Pop
- Length: 3:39
- Label: Energise Records
- Songwriter(s): Nalle Ahlstedt, Petri Somer, Sebastian Rejman, Paul Oxley
- Producer(s): Nalle Ahlstedt

Sean Smith singles chronology
"Turn Me On" (2016)	"Magic" (2017)	"Fire" (2017)

Music video
- "Magic" on YouTube

"Magic" is a song by the British singer Sean Smith. Sean released his second solo single 'Magic' on 26 May 2017. The track reached number 29 on the UK iTunes dance singles chart, and amassed over 140,000 streams on Spotify. On 22 May 2017 Sean appeared on the ITV show Loose Women to promote 'Magic' and unveil his new look.

== Recording ==
The track was recorded at The Old Blacksmiths Studios in Portsmouth with the vocals engineered by Ben Whyntie.

== Critical response ==
The Daily Mirror led with the headline "Same Difference's Sean Smith is unrecognisable as he unveils new look and solo career".

Jonathan Currinn, writing on his website Critic Jonni, commented "It's completely sexy from start to finish, with both Sean Smith and Chantelle Foreman showing off their bodily assets, although he is wearing much more clothing than she is".

== Chart performance ==
The single reached number 29 on the UK iTunes dance singles chart.

== Music video ==
The video was a filmed in a one-day shoot in London. The video director was Loraa White. Sean's co-star was model Chantelle Foreman.

=== Release and reception ===
The video was released on 26 May 2017 receiving positive reviews. An official lyric video for the Andy Sikorski remix was released on 31 May 2017

== Remixes ==
Andy Sikorski remixed the track providing a radio and club edit.

== Live appearances ==
Sean did a one-hour radio interview with Steven Clark, on Vale Radio, which was broadcast on 21 May 2017.

On 22 May 2017, Smith appeared on the ITV show Loose Women to promote 'Magic' and unveil his new look.

On 3 June 2017, Smith performed a live set at Oxford Pride which included the Andy Sikorski Remix of Magic.

== Formats and track listings ==
UK CD single

1. "Magic (Radio Mix)" – 3:39
2. "Magic (Andy Sikorski Edit)" – 3:25
3. "Magic (Andy Sikorski Club Mix)" – 5:07

Digital single

1. "Magic (Radio Mix)" – 3:39
2. "Magic (Andy Sikorski Edit)" – 3:25
3. "Magic (Andy Sikorski Club Mix)" – 5:07
