= Fire (Sean Smith song) =

Single by Sean Smith
- Released: 2 November 2017
- Genre: Pop
- Length: 3:32
- Label: Energise Records
- Songwriters: Daniel Volpe; Charlie Mason
- Producer: Daniel Volpe

Sean Smith singles chronology
"Magic" (2017)	"Fire" (2017)	"Verona" (2018)

Music video
- "Fire" on YouTube

"Fire" is a song by the British singer Sean Smith. It was written by Charlie Mason and Daniel Volpe (Daniel also produced it). The single was Sean's third solo single after signing to Energise Records. The track was released on 2 November 2017. The remix EP which featured remixes by Ricardo Autobahn & FNK'D UP DJ. It reached number 4 on the UK iTunes vocal album chart.

== Recording ==
The track was recorded at The Old Blacksmiths Studios in Portsmouth with the vocals engineered by Ben Whyntie. Sean's manager Stefan Pellett was also present at the recording.

== Chart performance ==
The EP reached number 4 on the UK iTunes vocal album chart. The single peaked at number 20 on the UK iTunes vocal singles chart.

== Music video ==
An official lyric video was released on 2 November 2017.

== Remixes ==
The EP featured remixes by Ricardo Autobahn and FNK'D UP DJ.

== Formats and track listings ==
UK CD single

1. "Fire " – 3:32
2. "Fire (Ricardo Autobahn Edit)" – 3:29
3. "Fire (FNK'D UP DJ Edit)" – 3:21
4. "Fire (Ricardo Autobahn Remix)" – 5:05
5. "Fire (FNK'D UP DJ Extended Mix)" – 4:29

Digital single

1. "Fire " – 3:32
2. "Fire (Ricardo Autobahn Edit)" – 3:29
3. "Fire (FNK'D UP DJ Edit)" – 3:21
4. "Fire (Ricardo Autobahn Remix)" – 5:05
5. "Fire (FNK'D UP DJ Extended Mix)" – 4:29
