= Pop (Same Difference album) =

Studio album by Same Difference
- Released: 1 December 2008
- Recorded: 2008
- Genre: Bubblegum pop
- Length: 34:05
- Label: Syco Records
- Producer: Simon Cowell

Same Difference chronology
Pop (2008)	The Rest Is History (2011)

Singles from "Pop"
- 1. "We R One" Released: November 24, 2008

Pop is the debut studio album from British pop duo and 2007 The X Factor finalists Same Difference. The album was released on December 1, 2008 by Syco Records. The album debuted at number 22 on the UK Album Chart, on first week sales of 31,064.

== Background ==
The album was recorded following on from their appearance in The X Factor, and contains both original tracks and cover versions of songs they performed during the show. The cover versions include "Breaking Free" (from the Disney film High School Musical), "Nothing's Gonna Stop Us Now" (originally by Starship), "I Need A House" (originally by Marie Serneholt), "Turn It into Love" (originally by Kylie Minogue), "Let Me Be The One" (originally by Six) and "Still Amazed", a retitled version of "The Way it Used to Be", also by Six. The release of the album is preceded by Same Difference's debut single "We R One", which was released on 24 November 2008 and reached number 13 in the UK Singles Chart. "Turn It into Love" was originally supposed to be the official second single. Pop entered the UK Albums Chart at number 22 with first week sales with 31,064.

After the release of their debut album, Same Difference and their record label Syco parted ways. Sarah Smith stated that she is pleased that any decisions made by herself and sibling Sean Smith will not have to be run through by SyCo their previous label.

== Track listing ==
1. "We R One"
2. "Let Me Be The One"
3. "Nothing's Gonna Stop Us Now"
4. "I Need a House"
5. "Breaking Free"
6. "If You Can't Dance"
7. "Right Between The Eyes"
8. "All The Roads Lead To Heaven"
9. "Better Love Me"
10. "Starts To Beat Again"
11. "Turn It into Love"
12. "Still Amazed"

== Charts ==
Chart (2008)	Peak position
Irish Albums Chart	66
UK Albums (Official Charts)	22
UK Independent Album Chart	1

== Certifications ==
Region	Certification	Certified units/sales
United Kingdom (BPI)	Gold	100,000^{^}
^{^} Shipments figures based on certification alone.
