= I Need a House =

Single by Marie Serneholt

from the album Enjoy the Ride
- B-side: "Calling All Detectives"
- Released: 6 June 2006
- Recorded: 2005
- Genre: Pop
- Length: 3:02
- Label: Sony BMG
- Songwriters: Elofsson; Rodrigues
- Producers: Elofsson; Westerlund; Brandén

Marie Serneholt singles chronology
"That's the Way My Heart Goes" (2006)	"I Need a House" (2006)	"Oxygen" (2006)

Alternative Cover
- European Single Cover

"I Need a House" is the second single by Swedish pop music singer Marie Serneholt released from her debut album Enjoy the Ride. The single was released on 6 June 2006 in Sweden.

"I Need a House" spent 3 weeks in the Swedish Top 60. Despite its low chart position, the song peaked at No. 2 on the Digital Sales in early May, when the video was released. Delays of the physical single skewed sales towards internet downloads.

The single has been released throughout Europe with a different cover and track listing.

Marie promoted her new single in (Germany), where it debuted at No. 49 on the German Top 100, but failed to make an impact on the charts and fell to No. 76 in its second week. The single charted on the German Top 100 for 5 weeks before falling off the charts.

In the United Kingdom, finalists of The X Factor, Same Difference recorded a version of the song for their debut album, Pop.

== Music video ==
The video for "I Need a House" was filmed in Sweden in April 2006, and was premiered in May with strong response on the Swedish music channels.

The video shows Marie in different facets of herself doing what she does in her house, Cooking, Working out, Talking on the phone, Taking a bath and other situations.

== Track listing ==
Swedish CD Single
European 2-Track CD Single

1. "I Need a House" (Radio Edit) – 3:02
2. "I Need a House" (Instrumental) – 3:02

Swedish Digital Download

1. "I Need a House" (Instrumental) – 3:02

European CD Maxi

1. "I Need a House" (Radio Edit) – 3:02
2. "I Need a House" (Michael Feiner Remix) – 6:53
3. "I Need a House" (Instrumental) – 3:02
4. "Calling All Detectives" – 3:56
5. Video: I Need a House [New Video Edit]

== Charts ==
Chart (2006)	Peak position
Germany (GfK)	49
Sweden (Sverigetopplistan)	40
Switzerland (Schweizer Hitparade)	72
