= I Don't Like Disco =

Studio album by Amanda Lear
- Released: 9 January 2012
- Recorded: 2011
- Genre: Electropop, pop rock
- Length: 32:34 (Original edition); 1:08:49 (Deluxe edition)
- Label: Little Boom, Boomlover
- Producer: Alain Mendiburu

Amanda Lear chronology
Brand New Love Affair (2009)	I Don't Like Disco (2012)	My Happiness (2014)

Professional ratings
Review scores
Source	Rating
DiscoIgor	positive
EuroDanceHits	positive
Music Story	3/5 stars
Now	3/5 stars
RockShock	1/5 stars

I Don't Like Disco is a studio album by French singer Amanda Lear, released in 2012 by independent label Little Boom Records and distributed by Universal Music France. The album spawned the minor hit "La Bête et la Belle".

== Background ==
I Don't Like Disco is Lear's first studio album since 1989's Uomini più uomini – and the fifth in her career – not to include any covers or re-recordings of her earlier hits. Stylistically, the album explores electropop with minor rock influences. The singer revealed that she called it I Don't Like Disco to separate herself from the image of the 'disco queen' she had earned earlier in her musical career. It was originally scheduled for release on 7 November 2011, but the launch was then pushed back to January 2012 to ensure more time for promotion. In August 2012, a deluxe edition of the album was released, containing additional recordings and remixes.

Three singles preceded the album's release in 2011: "Chinese Walk", "I Don't Like Disco" and "La Bête et la Belle". The fourth and final single, "Love at First Sight", was released in the summer 2012 to promote the deluxe edition of the album. "Chinese Walk" and "La Bête et la Belle" enjoyed popularity due to their well-received music videos. The videoclip for the latter has gone viral and caused controversies over its erotic overtones. The song "I Don't Like Disco" charted at no. 43 in Polish Dance Club Singles Chart in May 2015. The album itself was met with generally positive response from fans and critics, but was not a chart success.

== Track listing ==
=== Original release ===
1. "I Don't Like Disco" (Pete Wilson, Chris Richards, Amanda Lear) – 3:25
2. "What a Surprise" (Marin du Halgouët, Amanda Lear) – 3:15
3. "Windsor's Dance" (Marin du Halgouët, Amanda Lear) – 3:31
4. "Money Money" (Marin du Halgouët, Amanda Lear) – 3:05
5. "You're Mad" (Marin du Halgouët, Amanda Lear) – 3:32
6. "Super Hero" (Marin du Halgouët, Amanda Lear) – 3:16
7. "Icon" (Ken Lowe, Claire Dewey, Amanda Lear) – 2:44
8. "I Need Silence" (Marin du Halgouët, Amanda Lear) – 3:13
9. "La Bête et la Belle" (Louise Prey, Joe Moskow, Amanda Lear) – 3:20
10. "Chinese Walk" (Marin du Halgouët, Amanda Lear) – 3:09

=== Deluxe edition ===
1. "I Don't Like Disco" (Pete Wilson, Chris Richards, Amanda Lear) – 3:25
2. "La Bête et la Belle" (Louise Prey, Joe Moskow, Amanda Lear) – 3:21
3. "Love at First Sight" (Bob Landser, Amanda Lear) – 3:23
4. "Scorpio 66" (Louise Prey, Joe Moskow, Amanda Lear) – 3:57
5. "What a Surprise" (Marin du Halgouët, Amanda Lear) – 3:15
6. "Windsor's Dance" (New Mix) (Marin du Halgouët, Amanda Lear) – 3:30
7. "Money Money" (Marin du Halgouët, Amanda Lear) – 3:05
8. "You're Mad" (Club Version) (Marin du Halgouët, Amanda Lear) – 5:06
9. "Super Hero" (Marin du Halgouët, Amanda Lear) – 3:17
10. "Icon" (Ken Lowe, Claire Dewey, Amanda Lear) – 2:44
11. "I Need Silence" (Club Version) (Marin du Halgouët, Amanda Lear) – 5:00
12. "Chinese Walk" (Marin du Halgouët, Amanda Lear) – 3:09
13. "La Bête et la Belle" (Monster Mix Radio Edit) (Feat. Andy Bell & DJ Yiannis) (Louise Prey, Joe Moskow, Amanda Lear) – 3:46
14. "I Don't Like Disco" (Almighty Mix Radio Edit) (Pete Wilson, Chris Richards, Amanda Lear) – 3:30
15. "I Don't Like Disco" (RLS Remix Radio Edit) (Pete Wilson, Chris Richards, Amanda Lear) – 3:15
16. "La Bête et la Belle" (RLS Mix Radio Edit) (Louise Prey, Joe Moskow, Amanda Lear) – 3:16
17. "Scorpio 66" (Feat. Louise Prey & Joe Moscow) (Louise Prey, Joe Moskow, Amanda Lear) – 3:06
18. "La Bête et la Belle" (Deutsche Originalaufnahme Video Edit) (Louise Prey, Joe Moskow, Amanda Lear) – 3:32
19. "La Bête et la Belle" (Wutes Mix Club Edit) (Louise Prey, Joe Moskow, Amanda Lear) – 5:11

== Personnel ==
- Amanda Lear – lead vocals
- Gael Brusseleers – musical arranger, programming
- Steve Campioni – executive producer
- Melina Jacob – backing vocals
- Benjamin Joubert – mastering
- Bob Landser – guitar, backing vocals
- Franck Legendre – backing vocals
- Alain Mendiburu – record producer, executive producer

== Release history ==
Date	Region	Format and Edition	Label
9 January 2012	France	CD, digital	Little Boom Records, Boomlover
9 January 2012	Europe	digital	Little Boom Records, Boomlover
27 August 2012	Germany	CD, digital (deluxe edition)	Little Boom Records, Boomlover
27 August 2012	Europe	digital (deluxe edition)	Little Boom Records, Boomlover
