= The Rest Is History =

The Rest Is History may refer to:

- The Rest Is History (podcast), a history podcast hosted by Tom Holland and Dominic Sandbrook
- The Rest Is History (Jin album)
- The Rest Is History (Same Difference album)
- Aaron Karo: The Rest Is History, a comedy special by Aaron Karo
