= Same Difference =

English pop duo

- Origin: Widley, Portsmouth, England
- Genres: Pop
- Years active: 2007–2014, 2020
- Labels: Syco Music (2007–2009); PopLife (2010–2012); London (2013–2014)
- Members: Sean Smith; Sarah Wilson

Same Difference were an English bubblegum pop duo from Portsmouth, England, made up of siblings Sean and Sarah Smith. They came to prominence in 2007 when they were the last contestant eliminated in the fourth series of the ITV talent show, The X Factor.

Their music was targeted mostly at children who are 13 and under. Their debut single, "We R One", was released on 24 November 2008, and their debut album, Pop, followed on 1 December 2008. In November 2009, it was announced that Same Difference had signed a new record deal with PopLife Records, and their second album was released on 7 February 2011.

On 24 December 2014, Same Difference broke the news that they had disbanded but were still considering as to whether to release their third and final album, Superheroes. London Records stated it was fun working with them and that they were disappointed they could not share more musical memories together.

In 2020 Same Difference reunited for a one-off charity single with all proceeds going towards the COVID-19 Urgent Appeal. The single "One Life, One Love" was released through SP Music on 3 August and featured the students of SD Studios.

== Biography ==
The two siblings were brought up in The Dale, Widley, in the Borough of Havant. At the time of their appearance on The X Factor, Sean (born 24 September 1985) was an entertainer in Portsmouth while Sarah (born 4 November 1988) was a student. Sean left home at the age of 17 to perform on cruise ships and appeared in a number of pantomimes. Together, they performed at a local retirement home. Sarah left home at 16 to attend the Italia Conti Academy of Theatre Arts and completed her diploma in 2007. Sarah also worked as a model and acted in the show Genie in the House but stated that singing had always been her big passion.

== Career ==
Same Difference entered the fourth season of the British talent show The X Factor in 2007. They auditioned in London, where judge Simon Cowell described them as "potentially two of the most annoying people I've ever met." However, he went on to champion the duo as mentor, later calling them "genuinely nice people." During the live shows, the siblings came in for criticism from judge Louis Walsh, who described them as "cheesy" and suggested that they would be better suited to children's parties and pantomime. In response to Walsh's comments, Cowell and fellow judges Sharon Osbourne and Dannii Minogue disagreed, praising Same Difference for their upbeat performances.

The duo reached the final of the show, largely thanks to their performance of S Club 7's song "Never Had a Dream Come True" which received an enthusiastic reception from the studio audience. They eventually became the last contestant eliminated; Rhydian Roberts was the runner-up and Leon Jackson was the winner.

=== Performances on The X Factor ===
Round	Song choice	Original artist	Theme (if any)	Result
Week 1	"Tragedy"	Bee Gees/Steps	Number ones	1st
Week 2	"Breaking Free"	Zac Efron, Vanessa Anne Hudgens and Drew Seeley	Songs from films	3rd
Week 3	"Reach"	S Club 7	Big band	4th
Week 4	"I Don't Feel Like Dancin'"	Scissor Sisters	21st century hits	4th
Week 5	"Blame It on the Boogie"	The Jacksons	Disco	2nd
Week 6	"Nothing's Gonna Stop Us Now"	Starship	Love songs	3rd
Quarter-Final	"Any Dream Will Do"	From the musical Joseph and the Amazing Technicolor Dreamcoat	Best of British	3rd
Quarter-Final	"Wake Me Up Before You Go-Go"	Wham!	Best of British	3rd
Semi-Final	"Chain Reaction"	Diana Ross	"Songs to get you into the final"	2nd
Semi-Final	"Never Had a Dream Come True"	S Club 7	"Songs to get you into the final"	2nd
Final	"All I Want for Christmas Is You"	Mariah Carey	Christmas classics	Eliminated
Final	"Any Dream Will Do" (sung with Jason Donovan)	From the musical Joseph and the Amazing Technicolor Dreamcoat	Duet with guest	Eliminated
Final	"Breaking Free"	Zac Efron, Vanessa Anne Hudgens and Drew Seeley	Contestants' favourite songs from the series	Eliminated

=== 2008: Debut Album ===
After leaving the show, Same Difference initially signed a one-single contract with Simon Cowell's label Syco. During the X Factor Live tour the pair confirmed that their intended debut single was a cover of "Breaking Free" from High School Musical, which they had performed in the live shows of The X Factor. An original B-side to the single was also planned, entitled "The Miracle". The tracks were recorded in Poland in early March 2008.

In April 2008 it was reported their original one-single deal had been replaced by a full album deal, still with Syco, rumoured to be worth around £1 million.

On 19 July 2008 the duo performed at the "My First Festival" show at Legoland Windsor, appearing alongside Chico, Fireman Sam, Angelina Ballerina, Bob the Builder, and The Groovie Movie Band. They gigged at various places throughout 2008, including Christmas light switch-ons and Butlins.

Sarah and Sean made several television appearances after leaving the show, including spots on Blue Peter, Basil's Swap Shop, GMTV and Noel's Christmas Presents. They also made several appearances on Nickelodeon. On 22 November 2008 they returned to The X Factor as special guests and performed their debut single "We R One". On Sunday 14 December 2008 Same Difference appeared as guests on CITV kids' show Toonattik.

Following a deal with Syco, Same Difference-themed dolls featured on the website Stardoll

In a newsletter sent to their fans, the duo confirmed that their debut single, "We R One", would be released on the Syco Music/Sony BMG label on 24 November 2008. It was written by J Elofsson and P Westerlund, produced, recorded and mixed by Quiz & Larossi for XL Talent, and published by Universal Music Publishing AB: Elofsongs. It was also confirmed on their official website that their album, released on 1 December 2008, would be called Pop.

One of the tracks recorded for the album was a cover of the Stock Aitken Waterman-penned Kylie Minogue hit "Turn It Into Love".

An additional track recorded for their debut album, I Need A House, was previously recorded by Swedish popstar Marie Serneholt and released as a single in 2006.

=== 2009–11: The Rest Is History and new record label ===
Same Difference announced a 21-date UK tour for March and April 2009, but this was subsequently cancelled. Instead, the duo decided to co-headline a 21-date joint tour with fellow X Factor graduate Leon Jackson. Same Difference co-headlined the joint tour at Ipswich and Birmingham. They also played a solo one-off concert in Portsmouth.

Same Difference were dropped by record label Syco following disappointing sales of their debut album.

Under new management, the duo signed a new album deal with PopLife Records, and performed in a 66-date UK tour of Pontins Holiday Parks.

In December 2009, Same Difference announced on their Facebook Group the launch of a new website, sporting a quirky new look. The first single from their album, "Shine On Forever (Photo Frame)", was released on 29 August 2010, with music video directed by Lauren Pushkin and produced by PMA Digital. "Shine On Forever (Photo Frame)" entered the UK Singles Chart at Number 100 on 5 September 2010. The duo released their second album, The Rest Is History, on 7 February 2011.

On 10 September 2011, Same Difference announced on their "Same Difference Pop Academy", a course on singing and dancing for children. The course began in October 2011 in Portsmouth.

In late September 2011, Same Difference submitted an entry, "Music", to the Swiss national selection for the Eurovision Song Contest 2012. The bid failed, along with a separate one from Series 2 UK X Factor contestant Maria Lawson.

=== 2012–2014: Superheroes and split ===
In spring 2012, Same Difference confirmed they had begun recording their third album, stating that they had matured and a new sound would feature on their new album. On 6 January 2013 London Records and Same Difference confirmed they had agreed a new record deal.

On 24 December 2014, Same Difference broke the news that they had disbanded but were still considering whether to release their third and final album, Superheroes.

In 2020 Same Difference reunited for a one-off charity single with proceeds going towards the COVID-19 Urgent Appeal. The single "One Life, One Love" was released through SP Music on 3 August and featured the students of SD Studios.

After the disbandment of Same Difference, Sean Smith moved into musical theatre and solo music.

In December 2015, he performed in the title role of Aladdin at the Stiwt Theatre in Wrexham, appearing alongside Alex Reid.

From April to October 2016, Smith toured the UK in a lead role in the stage production That's Entertainment, performing with artists including Jane McDonald and The Overtones.

In September 2016, Smith signed with Energise Records and released his debut solo single, "Turn Me On". The track was written by Nalle Ahlstedt and Christian Ingebrigtsen of A1 and was accompanied by a remix EP featuring a remix by Paul Varney.

Later that year, Smith returned to the role of Aladdin, appearing at the Epstein Theatre in Liverpool from December 2016 to January 2017, alongside Natasha Hamilton, Jordan Davies and Mark Byron.

In May 2017, he released his second solo single, "Magic". That month, he appeared on the ITV programme Loose Women to promote the release and debut a new image.

Smith’s third solo single, "Fire", followed in November 2017.

In August 2018, he released a cover of "Verona", originally performed by Koit Toome and Laura Põldvere, recorded as a duet with Australian singer Peter Wilson. The track was produced by Matt Pop.

Smith continued his theatre work with performances as Prince Charming in Sleeping Beauty at the Capitol Theatre in Horsham in December 2018, and as the Tin Man in The Wizard of Oz at the Epstein Theatre in Liverpool in April 2019.

In February 2019, he released the single "Do or Die". Later that year, he provided lead vocals on "Show Me Love" by Beware the Bear, which featured in the BBC Two drama Mother Father Son starring Richard Gere. The single was released in May 2019 through SP Music.

In November 2019, Smith released "Dirty Mirrors", a duet with singer Ben Davidson, through Energise Records. That December, he reprised the role of Aladdin at the Forum Theatre in Barrow, with the production transferring to the Colne Muni Theatre in January 2020.

Smith released his debut solo album, Solo, in July 2020 through Energise Records. He continued his collaboration with Beware the Bear, featuring on the single "Wishing on the Water" in August 2020 and the EP We Will Survive in November 2020, which reached number 15 on the UK iTunes Singer-Songwriter Albums Chart.

In March 2021, Smith released the EP Hazard/Human via Energise Records. The following month, he released the album Swing for the 90s through SP Music, which reached number one on the UK iTunes Jazz Albums Chart and number 30 on the UK iTunes Albums Chart overall.

He reunited with Peter Wilson for the duet "One and One", released in April 2021 through Energise Records.

Smith released the singles "In Love with the Night" in June 2022 and "Young Love" in February 2023 through SP Music. In 2024, he released "Feels Like Forever" in January and "Little Song" in August.

In June 2025, Smith released the single "Feel This Love".

== Sean Smith solo career ==
After the disbandment of Same Difference, Sean Smith moved into musical theatre and solo music.

In December 2015, he performed in the title role of Aladdin at the Stiwt Theatre in Wrexham, appearing alongside Alex Reid.

From April to October 2016, Smith toured the UK in a lead role in the stage production That's Entertainment, performing with artists including Jane McDonald and The Overtones.

In September 2016, Smith signed with Energise Records and released his debut solo single, "Turn Me On". The track was written by Nalle Ahlstedt and Christian Ingebrigtsen of A1 and was accompanied by a remix EP featuring a remix by Paul Varney.

Later that year, Smith returned to the role of Aladdin, appearing at the Epstein Theatre in Liverpool from December 2016 to January 2017, alongside Natasha Hamilton, Jordan Davies and Mark Byron.

In May 2017, he released his second solo single, "Magic". That month, he appeared on the ITV programme Loose Women to promote the release and debut a new image.

Smith’s third solo single, "Fire", followed in November 2017.

In August 2018, he released a cover of "Verona", originally performed by Koit Toome and Laura Põldvere, recorded as a duet with Australian singer Peter Wilson. The track was produced by Matt Pop.

Smith continued his theatre work with performances as Prince Charming in Sleeping Beauty at the Capitol Theatre in Horsham in December 2018, and as the Tin Man in The Wizard of Oz at the Epstein Theatre in Liverpool in April 2019.

In February 2019, he released the single "Do or Die". Later that year, he provided lead vocals on "Show Me Love" by Beware the Bear, which featured in the BBC Two drama Mother Father Son starring Richard Gere. The single was released in May 2019 through SP Music.

In November 2019, Smith released "Dirty Mirrors", a duet with singer Ben Davidson, through Energise Records. That December, he reprised the role of Aladdin at the Forum Theatre in Barrow, with the production transferring to the Colne Muni Theatre in January 2020.

Smith released his debut solo album, Solo, in July 2020 through Energise Records. He continued his collaboration with Beware the Bear, featuring on the single "Wishing on the Water" in August 2020 and the EP We Will Survive in November 2020, which reached number 15 on the UK iTunes Singer-Songwriter Albums Chart.

In March 2021, Smith released the EP Hazard/Human via Energise Records. The following month, he released the album Swing for the 90s through SP Music, which reached number one on the UK iTunes Jazz Albums Chart and number 30 on the UK iTunes Albums Chart overall.

He reunited with Peter Wilson for the duet "One and One", released in April 2021 through Energise Records.

Smith released the singles "In Love with the Night" in June 2022 and "Young Love" in February 2023 through SP Music. In 2024, he released "Feels Like Forever" in January and "Little Song" in August.

In June 2025, Smith released the single "Feel This Love".

== Other appearances ==
Same Difference switched on the Christmas lights in 2009 in the town of Coalville, Leicestershire. They switched on the Christmas lights in Burton upon Trent in November 2010.

They also played Lilac Fairy and Prince Robin at Weston-super-Mare, in the pantomime Sleeping Beauty December to January 2012 – 2013.

Same Difference performed at The Concorde Club in Eastleigh on 26 November 2016.

== Discography ==
=== Studio albums ===
Title	Album details	Chart positions (UK)	Certifications
Pop	Released: December 2008; Label: Syco Music; Formats: CD, digital download	22	Gold
The Rest Is History	Released: February 2011; Label: PopLife Records; Formats: CD, digital download	100	

=== Singles ===
Year	Single	Chart position (UK)	Album
2008	"We R One"	13	Pop
2010	"Shine On Forever"	100	The Rest Is History
2020	"One Life, One Love (feat. Students from SD Studios)"	-	Non-album single
