= Brand New Love Affair =

Brand New Love Affair may refer to:

- Brand New Love Affair (EP), an EP by Amanda Lear
- "Brand New Love Affair" (song), a song by Chicago
