= Chinese Walk =

Single by Amanda Lear

from the album I Don't Like Disco
- Released: April 18, 2011
- Genre: Electropop
- Length: 3:21
- Label: Little Boom
- Songwriter(s): Marin du Halgouët, Amanda Lear
- Producer(s): Steve Campioni, Alain Mendiburu

Amanda Lear singles chronology
"I'm Coming Up" (2010)	"Chinese Walk" (2011)	"I Don't Like Disco" (2011)

Music video
- "Chinese Walk" on YouTube

"Chinese Walk" is a song by French singer Amanda Lear, released in 2011 by Little Boom Records as the first single from her album I Don't Like Disco.

== Song information ==
"Chinese Walk" is an uptempo electropop song written by Marin du Halgouët, arranged by Gaël Brusseleers, and produced by Steve Campioni and Alain Mendiburu. The lyrics, written by Amanda Lear in collaboration with Marin du Halgouët, tell about the growing influence of Chinese culture and make references to China's vast population. The track was recorded and mixed in Studio Entouka in Paris, and mastered by David Hadzis in Studio Arthanor in Geneva.

The song was released in April 2011 as the first single from Amanda's then-forthcoming album I Don't Like Disco. It was met with positive reception with some reviewers seeing it as a sequel to Lear's 70s disco hit "Queen of Chinatown". Although the song did not enter mainstream music charts, it did chart on DJ lists in France and Germany.

== Music video ==
The song's music video was directed by Thibault Guérin. It presents topless Amanda and drops of black liquid falling down on her, drawing patterns on her naked body. The singer is then transformer into a Chinese woman, complete with a kimono, straight black hair and an oil-paper umbrella. The video premiered on April 18, 2011 on Amanda Lear's official YouTube channel.

== Track listing ==
- Digital Single
1. "Chinese Walk" – 3:21
- Digital Single (Original + Instrumental)
1. "Chinese Walk" – 3:21
2. "Chinese Walk" (Instrumental) – 3:12
- Digital Maxi Single (Bruce EP)
1. "Chinese Walk" (Bruce Radio Mix) – 3:24
2. "Chinese Walk" (Bruce Extended Mix) – 4:30
3. "Chinese Walk" (Bruce Remix) – 4:04
- Digital Maxi Single (Remixes EP)
1. "Chinese Walk" (Mirko Oberto Club Mix) – 5:02
2. "Chinese Walk" (Bruce Remix) – 4:04
3. "Chinese Walk" (Starplayerz Remix) – 5:17
4. "Chinese Walk" (Mirko Oberto Radio Mix) – 2:47
- CD Maxi Single
1. "Chinese Walk" – 3:21
2. "Chinese Walk" (Bruce Extended Mix) – 4:31
3. "Chinese Walk" (Mirko Oberto Club Mix) – 5:03
4. "Chinese Walk" (Bruce Remix) – 4:04
5. "Chinese Walk" (Starplayerz Remix) – 5:17
6. "La Bête et la Belle" – 3:21
