= Enjoy the Ride =

Enjoy the Ride may refer to:

- Enjoy the Ride (Marie Serneholt album) (2006), by Swedish pop singer Marie Serneholt
- Enjoy the Ride (Marshall Dyllon album) (2001), by country music boy band Marshall Dyllon
- Enjoy the Ride (Sugarland album) (2006), by country duo Sugarland
- "Enjoy the Ride", by Morcheeba, 2008
- "Enjoy the Ride" (Krewella song)
- "Enjoy the Ride", a season 4 episode of the TV series Everwood
- "Enjoy the Ride" (Hollyoaks), storyline from the British soap opera Hollyoaks
