= Honour, Profit and Pleasure =

British television film

- Genre: Period drama
- Written by: Anna Ambrose; Peter Luke
- Directed by: Anna Ambrose
- Starring: Simon Callow
- Composer: Nicholas Kraemer
- Country of origin: United Kingdom
- Original language: English

Production
- Producers: Ann Skinner; Michael Whyte
- Cinematography: Peter MacDonald
- Editor: George Akers
- Running time: 102 minutes
- Production company: Spectre Films

Original release
- Network: Channel 4
- Release: June 1985

Honour, Profit and Pleasure is a 1985 British television film directed by Anna Ambrose and starring Simon Callow as George Frideric Handel, with an ensemble cast portraying a variety of other roles. It was broadcast to celebrate three hundredth anniversary of the year of the composer's birth in 1685. The film focuses on Handel's career in early Georgian London.

== Cast ==
- Simon Callow as Handel
- Alan Devlin as Quin
- Jean Rigby as Susannah Cibber
- Christopher Benjamin as Heidegger
- Bernard Hepton as The Bishop of London
- Cyril Luckham as The Archbishop of Canterbury
- T.P. McKenna as Swift
- John Moffatt as Steele
- James Villiers as Addison
- Frederick Schiller as Waltz
- Jonathan Hyde as Aaron Hill
- Chris Barrie as Alexander Pope
- Hugh Grant as Burlington
- Pauline Jameson as Dowager Countess
- Miriam Margolyes as Elephant & Castle
- Janet Henfrey as Hop-Pole
- John Abineri as George I
- Sebastian Abineri as George II
- Suzy Aitchison as Mary Delaney
- David Neal as Shrewsbury
- James Bowman as Rinaldo

== Bibliography ==
- Murphy, Robert. Directors in British and Irish Cinema: A Reference Companion. Bloomsbury Publishing, 2019.
- Tibbetts, John C. Composers in the Movies: Studies in Musical Biography. Yale University Press, 2008.
