= Colin Heywood =

Singer, actor and television presenter

Daniel James
- Also known as: Daniel James
- Born: Colin Heywood

Daniel James, formally known under his birth name of Colin Heywood, is a singer, actor and presenter of shows on television and radio.

In 1986, he competed in the BBC's A Song For Europe contest under the name Colin Heywood with "No Easy Way to Love", a song co-written by Tony Hiller, the producer known for many of the songs by Brotherhood of Man. A Song For Europe was a contest was to represent the United Kingdom in the 1986 Eurovision Song Contest, but he came in sixth place, losing out to the band Ryder, with the song "Runner in the Night".

Under his birth name, he appeared in the 1987 horror film Bloody New Year and hosted the BBC children's programme But First This with Sue Devaney, Siobhan Maher Kennedy and Andy Crane.After having initial success as Colin Heywood, he changed his name to his Grandfathers name and has since been legally known as "Daniel James" (legal citation is available), .

== Yell! ==
After meeting Jeff Chegwin, the brother of Keith Chegwin and Janice Long, he was placed in a pop duo with Paul Varney called Yell! and signed to Simon Cowell's Fanfare Records. Yell! had a Top 10 hit in the United Kingdom with a cover of Dan Hartman's 1978 hit, "Instant Replay" and would go on to cover the Average White Band's "Let's Go Round Again".

James later returned to his music career in the 2020s. In 2020, James released a podcast for the Stock Aitken Waterman Show, where he talked about music and being part of Yell!, his first meeting with Mike Stock and Matt Aitken and releasing Safety In Numbers, as well as being signed by Simon Cowell.

== Bangers and Chat ==
As of 2021, James has a radio show on Mike Read's Heritage Chart Radio station called Bangers and Chat, and has appeared on their chart show programme on Talking Pictures TV promoting various singles like "Don't Want To Lose That Girl", "Set Your Spirit Free" and his Christmas medley "Silent Night O Holy Night".
