= Brief Encounters =

Studio album by Amanda Lear
- Released: 16 October 2009
- Recorded: 2008–2009
- Genre: Pop, jazz, dance
- Length: 90:33 (Original edition)
- Language: English, French
- Label: Just Good Music for Your Ears, Universo Music Group, PMG Music
- Producer: Nerio Poggi, Enrico Petrelli, Carl M Cox, Nathan Thomas, Peter Wilson, Chris Richards

Amanda Lear chronology
With Love (2006)	Brief Encounters (2009)	Brand New Love Affair (2009)

Professional ratings
Review scores
Source	Rating
Rockol	(favorable)
Stile	(mixed)

Brief Encounters is a studio album by French singer Amanda Lear, released in 2009 by independent label Just Good Music for Your Ears.

== Background ==
Amanda Lear met the singer and producer Enrico Petrelli in Paris in 2008. She started working on the album in the autumn of 2008, with recording sessions in Rome and Paris. Together with PMG (Prolific Media Group) producers Carl M Cox and Nathan Thomas, she recorded a song called "Doin' Fine", previously recorded by Australian singer-producer Peter Wilson. Wilson and his songwriting partner Chris Richards have contributed four songs to the album; however, only two would make the cut, while the other two were included in Lear's next musical project. PMG continued to work with Amanda in 2009, producing two remixes of the ballad "Someone Else's Eyes".

Lear announced that new album was in the works in late 2008 on French and Italian TV. The album was then previewed at the annual Midem music conference in France on 18–20 January. Originally scheduled for April 2009 release, then the summer, it was eventually released on 16 October 2009 in Italy. A two-CD set, Brief Encounters consists of downtempo pop songs and ballads on disc 1 ('For the Heart'), and uptempo dance tracks and remixes on disc 2 ('For the Feet'). The album included a number of cover versions of tracks like Amy Winehouse's "Back to Black", Lenny Kravitz's "I Belong to You" and Lou Reed's "Perfect Day" alongside new songs, written mainly by Enrico Petrelli and Amanda Lear.

The official track list posted in early 2009 on the album's site originally included two songs written by Peter Wilson and Chris Richards ("Brand New Love Affair", "C'est la vie") as well as "It's Hard to Say Goodbye" and "It's a Good Day" on disc 2, which were all replaced with remixes of "For What I Am", "Someone Else's Eyes" and "This Is Not America". The acoustic version of "Cupidon" on disc 1 was replaced with the "Someone Else's Eyes" video.

"Someone Else's Eyes", the duet with Enrico "Deadstar" Petrelli, was chosen as the album's lead and only single at that time, although promo video for "Doin' Fine" was also produced, and in 2012, "Back to Black" was released as a 3-track digital single. Brief Encounters was soon followed by the release of a dance music-oriented EP Brand New Love Affair.

On 28 December 2009, acoustic versions of selected songs from the album were recorded for a new CD called Brief Encounters Acoustique and sold via the album's official website. This version included a new recording of Vladimir Cosma's "Reality". A remix album called Brief Encounters Reloaded was released in May 2010, promoted by Boy George's remixes of "Someone Else's Eyes". It also included a cover of Culture Club's "Do You Really Want to Hurt Me". A re-edition of the acoustic version, called Brief Encounters Acoustique – Golden Edition, was released at the beginning of 2011.

== Track listing ==
=== Original release ===
==== CD 1 – For the Heart ====
1. "Someone Else's Eyes" (feat. Deadstar) (Enrico Petrelli) – 4:15
2. "Back to Black" (Amy Winehouse, Mark Ronson) – 4:09
3. "Cupidon" (Enrico Petrelli, Yuri Primarosa, Nerio Poggi, Amanda Lear) – 3:15
4. "I Belong to You" (Lenny Kravitz) – 3:56
5. "I Don't Wanna Lose You" (Enrico Petrelli, Amanda Lear, Ely Barbosa) – 3:30
6. "Fallin' in Love Again" (Eagle-Eye Cherry) – 2:48
7. "Je m'appelle Amanda" (Enrico Petrelli, Amanda Lear) – 2:47
8. "Let's Love" (James Louise Cartney) – 2:48
9. "Perfect Day" (Lou Reed) – 3:30
10. "Comment te dire adieu?" (Serge Gainsbourg, Arnold Goland, Jack Gold) – 2:21
11. "Sorrow" (Bob Feldman, Jerry Goldstein, Richard Gottehrer) – 2:37
12. "Suicide Is Painless (Song from M*A*S*H)" (Johnny Mandel, Mike Altman) – 2:37
13. "Secret Lover" (Marco Morbidelli, Daniele Coluccini) – 1:56

Video: "Someone Else's Eyes" (feat. Deadstar) (Enrico Petrelli) – 4:06

==== CD 2 – For the Feet ====
1. "Doin' Fine" (Carl M Cox, Nathan Thomas, Baz Qureshi, Chris Rudall, Peter Wilson, Chris Richards, Frank Farian, George Reyam) – 3:44
2. "Someone Else's Eyes" (All Eyes on the Dance Floor radio edit) (feat. Deadstar) (Enrico Petrelli) – 3:33
3. "This Is Not America" (Obsessive mix) (Enrico Petrelli) – 3:47
4. "Let the Music Play" (long version remix) (Giorgio Moroder, Pete Bellotte) – 5:25
5. "Always on My Mind" (radio edit) (Johnny Christopher, Mark James, Wayne Carson) – 3:38
6. "For What I Am" (radio edit) (Enrico Petrelli) – 2:50
7. "For What I Am" (R'n'B version) (Enrico Petrelli) – 2:57
8. "This Is Not America" (long version remix) (Enrico Petrelli) – 6:01
9. "Always on My Mind" (T1's club anthem mix) (Johnny Christopher, Mark James, Wayne Carson) – 6:32
10. "Doin' Fine" (extended version) (Carl M Cox, Nathan Thomas, Baz Qureshi, Chris Rudall, Peter Wilson, Chris Richards, Frank Farian, George Reyam) – 7:44
11. "This Is Not America" (808 Ketamix) (Enrico Petrelli) – 4:48

=== Acoustique ===
1. "Cupidon" (Enrico Petrelli, Yuri Primarosa, Nerio Poggi, Amanda Lear)
2. "Je m'appelle Amanda" (Enrico Petrelli, Amanda Lear)
3. "I Belong to You" (Lenny Kravitz)
4. "Back to Black" (Amy Winehouse, Mark Ronson)
5. "Let's Love" (James Louise Cartney)
6. "Fallin' in Love Again" (Eagle-Eye Cherry)
7. "Someone Else's Eyes" (feat. Deadstar) (Enrico Petrelli)
8. "I Don't Wanna Lose You" (Enrico Petrelli, Amanda Lear, Ely Barbosa)
9. "Secret Lover" (Album Version) (Marco Morbidelli, Daniele Coluccini)
10. "Suicide Is Painless" (Johnny Mandel, Mike Altman)
11. "Sorrow" (Bob Feldman, Jerry Goldstein, Richard Gottehrer)
12. "Reality" (Demo Studio Version) (Vladimir Cosma)
13. "Je m'appelle Amanda" (Piano Version) (Enrico Petrelli, Amanda Lear)

=== Reloaded ===
1. "Someone Else's Eyes" (Boy George & Kinky Roland mix) (feat. Deadstar) (Enrico Petrelli) – 5:50
2. "Doin' Fine" (Ford & Curnow's TNT mix) (Carl M Cox, Nathan Thomas, Baz Qureshi, Chris Rudall, Peter Wilson, Chris Richards, Frank Farian, George Reyam) – 7:21
3. "Back to Black" (Amanda's Vino Della Casa mix) (Amy Winehouse, Mark Ronson) – 4:02
4. "For What I Am" (Raider's of the Lost Music mix) (Enrico Petrelli) – 4:37
5. "Someone Else's Eyes" (Fully Loaded NRG radio mix) (feat. Deadstar) (Enrico Petrelli) – 3:20
6. "Sorrow" (Hi-Lites mix) (Bob Feldman, Jerry Goldstein, Richard Gottehrer) – 3:43
7. "This Is Not America" (United Sounds of Amanda mix) (Enrico Petrelli) – 6:32
8. "Suicide Is Painless" (Anadin Extra mix) (Johnny Mandel, Mike Altman) – 3:34
9. "Always on My Mind" (Psychology mix) (Johnny Christopher, Mark James, Wayne Carson) – 6:40
10. "Someone Else's Eyes" (Visionary mix) (feat. Deadstar) (Enrico Petrelli) – 4:05
11. "Doin' Fine" (Devil's Desire mix) (Carl M Cox, Nathan Thomas, Baz Qureshi, Chris Rudall, Peter Wilson, Chris Richards, Frank Farian, George Reyam) – 5:30
12. "I Don't Wanna Lose You" (Lost and Found mix) (Enrico Petrelli, Amanda Lear, Ely Barbosa) – 3:55
13. "Perfect Day" (Nocturnal Anthem Mix) (Lou Reed) – 3:40
14. "Sorrow" (Pete Hammond's Unapologetic Retro mix) (Bob Feldman, Jerry Goldstein, Richard Gottehrer) – 7:24
15. "Do You Really Want to Hurt Me" (Sanctuary mix) (Culture Club) – 6:34

=== Acoustique – The Golden Edition ===
1. "Cupidon" (Enrico Petrelli, Yuri Primarosa, Nerio Poggi, Amanda Lear) – 3:12
2. "Je m'appelle Amanda" (Enrico Petrelli, Amanda Lear) – 2:46
3. "I Belong to You" (Lenny Kravitz) – 3:42
4. "Back to Black" (Amy Winehouse, Mark Ronson) – 4:06
5. "Fallin' in Love Again" (Eagle-Eye Cherry) – 2:50
6. "Someone Else's Eyes" (feat. Deadstar) (Enrico Petrelli) – 4:26
7. "I Don't Wanna Lose You" (Enrico Petrelli, Amanda Lear, Ely Barbosa) – 3:26
8. "Secret Lover" (Album Version) (Marco Morbidelli, Daniele Coluccini) – 1:59
9. "Suicide Is Painless" (Johnny Mandel, Mike Altman) – 2:40
10. "Sorrow" (Bob Feldman, Jerry Goldstein, Richard Gottehrer) – 2:28
11. "For What I Am" (electro-acoustic version) (Enrico Petrelli) – 2:25
12. "Comment te dire adieu" (guitar demo version) (Serge Gainsbourg, Arnold Goland, Jack Gold) – 2:04
13. "I Don't Wanna Lose You" (piano version) (Enrico Petrelli, Amanda Lear, Ely Barbosa) – 3:20
14. "Reality" (demo studio version) (Vladimir Cosma) – 3:18
15. "Je m'appelle Amanda" (piano version) (Enrico Petrelli, Amanda Lear) – 2:50
16. "Cupidon" (quartet symphony long version) (Enrico Petrelli, Yuri Primarosa, Nerio Poggi, Amanda Lear) – 6:29

=== Reloaded – Dance & Smooth ===
==== CD 1 – Dance ====
1. "Always on My Mind" (T1's club anthem edit) (Johnny Christopher, Mark James, Wayne Carson)
2. "Doin' Fine" (Devil's Desire mix) (Carl M Cox, Nathan Thomas, Baz Qureshi, Chris Rudall, Peter Wilson, Chris Richards, Frank Farian, George Reyam)
3. "Sorrow" (Hi-Lites mix) (Bob Feldman, Jerry Goldstein, Richard Gottehrer)
4. "Someone Else's Eyes" (PMG's All Eyes on the Dancefloor radio edit) (feat. Deadstar) (Enrico Petrelli)
5. "Perfect Day" (Nocturnal Anthem mix) (Lou Reed)
6. "Back to Black" (Amanda's Vino Della Casa mix) (Amy Winehouse, Mark Ronson)
7. "Suicide Is Painless" (Anadin Extra mix) (Johnny Mandel, Mike Altman)
8. "Do You Really Want to Hurt Me" (Sanctuary mix) (Culture Club)
9. "I Don't Wanna Lose You" (Lost and Found mix) (Enrico Petrelli, Amanda Lear, Ely Barbosa)
10. "For What I Am" (Raider's of the Lost Music mix) (Enrico Petrelli)
11. "Let the Music Play" (long version remix) (Giorgio Moroder, Pete Bellotte)
12. "This Is Not America" (United Sounds of Amanda mix) (Enrico Petrelli)
13. "Comment te dire adieu" (Serge Gainsbourg, Arnold Goland, Jack Gold)
14. "Always on My Mind" (T1's club anthem mix) (Johnny Christopher, Mark James, Wayne Carson)
15. "Doin' Fine" (Ford & Curnow's TNT mix) (Carl M Cox, Nathan Thomas, Baz Qureshi, Chris Rudall, Peter Wilson, Chris Richards, Frank Farian, George Reyam)
16. "Someone Else's Eyes" (Boy George & Kinky Roland mix) (feat. Deadstar) (Enrico Petrelli)

==== CD 2 – Smooth ====
1. "Back to Black" (Amy Winehouse, Mark Ronson)
2. "Cupidon" (Enrico Petrelli, Yuri Primarosa, Nerio Poggi, Amanda Lear)
3. "I Belong to You" (Lenny Kravitz)
4. "Falling in Love Again" (Eagle-Eye Cherry)
5. "Je m'appelle Amanda" (piano version) (Enrico Petrelli, Amanda Lear)
6. "Secret Lover" (Marco Morbidelli, Daniele Coluccini)
7. "Someone Else's Eyes" (feat. Deadstar) (Enrico Petrelli)
8. "Comment te dire adieu" (guitar version) (Serge Gainsbourg, Arnold Goland, Jack Gold)
9. "I Don't Wanna Lose You" (Enrico Petrelli, Amanda Lear, Ely Barbosa)
10. "Perfect Day" (Lou Reed)
11. "Suicide Is Painless" (Johnny Mandel, Mike Altman)
12. "Sorrow" (Bob Feldman, Jerry Goldstein, Richard Gottehrer)
13. "Reality (Dreams)" (Vladimir Cosma)

== Personnel ==
- Amanda Lear – lead vocals, album concept, illustrations on Brief Encounters Acoustique
- Mauro Andreoni – piano (Brief Encounters Acoustique)
- Alessandro Bevilacqua – bass (Brief Encounters Acoustique)
- Alfredo Bochicchio – guitar (Brief Encounters Acoustique)
- Giacomo Bondi – mastering
- Attilio Bovi – guitar (Brief Encounters Acoustique)
- Elio Leonardo Carchidi – artwork and photography
- Sophie Clarke – backing vocals (Brief Encounters Reloaded)
- Carl M Cox – record producer
- Mariano Felisio – mixing, editing
- Fabrizio Foggia – piano (Brief Encounters Acoustique)
- Massimo Guerra – trumpet, horn
- Toto Ielasi – bass (Brief Encounters Acoustique)
- Ilze Kalve – backing vocals (Brief Encounters Reloaded)
- Alain Mendiburu – album concept
- Mauro Menegazzi – accordion (Brief Encounters Acoustique)
- Ann Montini – backing vocals (Brief Encounters Reloaded)
- Enrico Petrelli (a.k.a. Deadstar) – executive producer, musical arranger, album concept, vocals on "Someone Else's Eyes"
- Nerio Poggi – record producer, musical arranger, keyboards on Brief Encounters Acoustique
- Baz Qureshi – backing vocals (Brief Encounters Reloaded)
- Alex Raider – mastering (Brief Encounters Reloaded)
- Chris Richards – record producer
- Massimo Satta – guitar (Brief Encounters Acoustique)
- Alan Scaffardi – backing vocals (Brief Encounters Reloaded)
- Neil Sean – backing vocals (Brief Encounters Reloaded)
- Nathan Thomas – record producer, backing vocals
- Fabio Tullio – saxophone (Brief Encounters Acoustique)
- Steen Ulrich – backing vocals (Brief Encounters Reloaded)
- Peter Wilson – record producer

== Release history ==
Year	Region	Format and Edition	Label
16 October 2009	Europe	CD, digital	Just Good Music for Your Ears, Universo Media Group
28 December 2009	Europe	CD, digital (Brief Encounters Acoustique)	Just Good Music for Your Ears
25 May 2010	Europe	CD, digital (Brief Encounters Reloaded)	Just Good Music for Your Ears, PMG Music
13 January 2011	Europe	CD, digital (Brief Encounters Acoustique – The Golden Edition)	Just Good Music for Your Ears
31 May 2013	Europe	CD (Brief Encounters Reloaded – Dance & Smooth)	Just Good Music for Your Ears
