= The Baskervilles =

British-French-Canadian animated children's television series

- Created by: Alastair Swinnerton; Nick Martinelli
- Directed by: Nick Martinelli
- Voices of: Rob Brydon; Gary Martin; Rachel Preece; Suzy Aitchison
- Theme music composer: Danny Chang
- Composer: Jeff Fisher
- Countries of origin: United Kingdom; France; Canada
- Original languages: English; French
- No. of seasons: 2
- No. of episodes: 26

Production
- Executive producers: Christian Davin; Micheline Charest; Ronald A. Weinberg
- Producer: Cassandra Schafhausen
- Running time: 23 minutes
- Production companies: CINAR; Alphanim; Carlton Television; Blue Nose Productions

Original release
- Network: Teletoon (Canada); France 2 (France); CITV (UK)
- Release: 10 March – 13 December 2000

The Baskervilles is an animated children's television series about a British family living in the most twisted theme park in the world. The show was originally created by series co-director Nick Martinelli and series co-writer Alastair Swinnerton, and was a co-production with CINAR, Alphanim and France 2, and produced in association with Carlton Television and Blue Nose Productions, with the participation of Teletoon. 26 episodes were produced.

== Premise ==
When a wealthy man made his fortune convincing the world that bad is good and good is bad, he got bored of his success, and wanted to have some fun with his fortune; he created a huge theme park as a slice of life look at Hell, called Underworld: the Theme Park. Disguised as the devil and calling himself "the Boss", he sunk to new lows in deviant behaviour, but it wasn't enough; so he invited a nice family to live in Underworld, for the sole purpose of torturing them. But when his skeletal right-hand man, Kevin directed the Baskervilles his way, he may have bitten off more than he can chew.

The show is almost a mirror image of The Munsters, where instead of a family of monsters trying to live in a human suburb, it's a human family trying to fit in a demonic city, where all the rules are the opposite of what they were back home.

== Characters ==
=== The Baskervilles ===
A quiet family from Nice Town, they are a picture perfect portrait of what a nice quiet family should be; except for one little girl who is interminably put off by the excessive politeness of her kin. After seeing an advertisement for Underworld on the TV, they decide to spend their vacation there, not knowing the owner's true intentions.

- Brian Baskerville — The perfect 50's TV sitcom father figure, he's so nice it's totally unbearable; he has been known to ramble on about various stories, and drives the nearby denizens of Underworld to madness within minutes. Voiced by Rob Brydon.
- Janet Baskerville — The perfect mother, she seems to understand the rules of Underworld a little better than her husband, but that doesn't stop her from doing things the nice way, instead of the Underworld way. Voiced by Rachel Preece.
- Darren Baskerville — The perfect 50's sitcom teenage son, polite and mostly on the oblivious side like most of the family. He has a crush on Fangora Dracula. Voiced by Gary Martin.
- April Baskerville — A precocious young girl who is the exact opposite of her ultra-nice family; she's the only one who understands just what the Boss is up to, and intends on having a fun time thwarting him and his schemes. She absolutely loves Underworld, and may be even meaner than the Boss. Like most young girls, she has a crush on most hunky looking guys, like Young Frank; but has so far only attracted the attention of Vlad Jr., whom she despises. Voiced by Suzy Aitchison.
- Spot — The Baskervilles' robotic three headed hound, each head can talk and has its own personality: Cool Spot a sunglasses wearing dude who is April's best friend; Bad Spot a rabid monster who loves nothing more than total destruction; and Dumb Spot a complete idiot, likely the dumbest creature in the whole park.
- Colin — The Baskervilles' talking house, like all houses in Underworld, instead of giving shelter to his family, he is secretly trying to bump them off; but at least he's polite about it. Voiced by Gary Martin.

=== The Lucifers ===
A family of demons, with purple skin, horns and red eyes; the Boss rules Underworld with an iron fist, but he is the only one in his family who is actually mean.

- Nicolas Lucifer III (a.k.a. "the Boss") — The villainous owner of Underworld, he is so serious about his position as the devil and that Underworld really is Hell, that some people wonder if he's gone completely off the deep end, and actually believes it. He is constantly dreaming up ways to make Underworld even scarier, and scheming new ways to torment the Baskervilles, who usually shrug off his attempts as being in good fun, and enjoy the strange game he plays. Only April suspects how demented he really is. Voiced by Gary Martin.
- Nicolas Lucifer II (a.k.a. "the Old Man") — The Old Man is nowhere near as mean as his son; in fact, he's down right nice most of the time. He's generally put off by the Boss' total meanness and gets his jollies throwing monkey wrenches into the mix, such as fixing everyone's plumbing so it works, and dressing up as Santa Claus on Christmas. Voiced by Rob Brydon.
- Nicole Lucifer — The Boss' teenage daughter, who left home years ago because she was nice and her father was mean; she is also the creator of "Itsy Bitsy Wabbit", and once dated Kevin. Nicole has a French accent, and as such, most people who speak her name say it with a French flair.

=== The Draculas ===
The Baskervilles' next door neighbours are a family of vampires, who bear some resemblance to the Baskervilles' Nice Town neighbours. The Draculas have pale blue skin, black hair, red eyes, and talk in thick Irish accents (except for Vera who has black eyes and speaks in an Eastern European accent).

- Vlad Dracula — A short nebbish man, Vlad is a rather quiet man who would rather be fishing than terrifying the people of Underworld. A constant running gag is the bandages on his face; since he is a vampire, he cannot see his reflection, and repeatedly cuts himself while shaving.
- Vera Dracula — The most voluptuous creature in Underworld—second only to the Boss' ex-wife who is only seen in a picture, never in person—leaving many to ask how a nerd like Vlad was able to hitch up with her.
- Fangora Dracula — The Draculas' teenage daughter who describes herself as a rebel; but in Underworld, that means she's a straight-A student who enjoys playing with dolls and never messes up the house with wild parties when her parents are out. She has a love-hate relationship with Darren: she's infatuated with his Nice Town charm and mannerisms, but his attempts at fitting into Underworld continuously infuriate Fangora's rebel side.
- Vlad Dracula Jr. — Around April's age, Vlad Jr. is a total creep who spends most of the series stalking and harassing April. She must constantly be on guard against his attempts to kiss her, invade her personal space, or steal her diary, for comedies sake.

=== The Frankensteins ===
The Frankensteins are a family of reanimated creatures, ala Dr. Frankenstein's monster. They all have green skin and speak in Scottish accents; they are notoriously strong and stupid, and their favourite pastime is running amok.

- Frank Frankenstein — Foreman of the Misery Factory, he is responsible for production of all the nasty things in Underworld; outside of work, he is the most polite citizen in Underworld, even while he's smashing things to bits during a rampage.
- Fran Frankenstein — Easily noticed by her big hair and even bigger behind.
- Young Frank Frankenstein — Around April's age, he is the target of her affection, but he seems too stupid to notice.
- Little Monster Annie — She may be the smallest and youngest character on the show, but this naturally makes her the most dangerous.

=== Other ===
- Kevin — A skeleton with wings on his back, he is the Boss' right-hand man and speaks in an Australian accent; he is married to a gorgon, and they have a skeletal daughter named Noline. Unlike most other characters that are actors in costume, Kevin is a robot.
- The Police Chief — The police chief is a stereotypical overweight backwater redneck sheriff who speaks in a Southern American accent. The rest of the police force consists mostly of over muscled officers, and heavily armoured SWAT teams with police sirens embedded in their heads. He follow the orders of Nicolas Lucifer III.
- Mr. Mad Scientist — He works for the Boss and created most of the technology used in Underworld; he is always tied up in a straight jacket, and has a hatch on the top of his head where two mechanical hands pop out to do his work. A number of his creations have caused havoc in Underworld, including:
  - Chuck Steele and Chuck Steele Jr. — Adult and teenage clones of Brian's old high school rival created to mess up the Baskervilles.
  - The Pesky Bats — A trio of female bats who pull pranks on anyone and everyone.
  - The Scarlet Pimple — A clone of an old Underworld villain who kidnapped people from Underworld and delivered them to Nice Town; including several werewolves and the Draculas.
- Itsy Bitsy Wabbit — A cutesy cartoon character created by Nicole, he is actually based on the Rodent Revenger III, created by the Boss and given as a gift to a young Nicole; but she didn't like the menacing name, and called him "Itsy Bitsy". When she grew up, she and Kevin co-created the cartoon character, based on the mechanical monster.

== Episodes ==
With Teletoon original airdates in parentheses:

1. No Place Like Home (10 March 2000)
2. Displeasure Dome (12 March 2000)
3. High Maintenance (18 March 2000)
4. Moral Minority (19 March 2000)
5. Doc April & Mr. Dad (25 March 2000)
6. Hounds of the Baskervilles (26 March 2000)
7. Bringing the House Down (1 April 2000)
8. Here's Looking at You Kevin (2 April 2000)
9. Food of the Slobs (8 April 2000)
10. Road to Ruin (19 October 2000)
11. Summer School Daze (9 April 2000)
12. Nice World (16 April 2000)
13. Faust Times at Underworld High (22 April 2000)
14. The Not So Great Escape (20 October 2000)
15. Welcome to the Underworld (17 July 2000)
16. Sizzling Ribaldry (13 September 2000)
17. Right Trousers, Wrong Brian (21 October 2000)
18. Ghouls on Film (21 July 2000)
19. Don't Mind the Baby (22 October 2000)
20. Old Saint Nick (13 December 2000)
21. Ghouls Scout (24 October 2000)
22. Crumble in the Jungle (24 July 2000)
23. Sulfur Surfer (12 May 2000)
24. Doomsday Tuesday (23 September 2000)
25. Scarlet Pimple (24 September 2000)
26. Beauty and the Bunny (25 October 2000)
