= Someone Else's Eyes =

Single by Amanda Lear feat. Deadstar

from the album Brief Encounters
- B-side: "Secret Lover", "Doin' Fine"
- Released: 2009
- Genre: Pop
- Length: 4:08
- Label: Just Good Music for Your Ears
- Songwriter: Enrico Petrelli
- Producer: Enrico Petrelli

Amanda Lear singles chronology
"Queen of Chinatown 2006" (2006)	"Someone Else's Eyes" (2009)	"Brand New Love Affair (In the Mix)" (2009)

"Someone Else's Eyes" is a 2009 song by French singer Amanda Lear and Italian singer Deadstar. It was released by the independent label Just Good Music for Your Ears as the lead single from Lear's album Brief Encounters.

== Song information ==
"Someone Else's Eyes" is a vocal duet between Lear and Enrico Petrelli, better known under his stage name Deadstar, who has also written and produced the track. It is a mid-tempo pop song with jazz elements, arranged by Nerio Poggi, including a saxophone solo by Fabio Tullio. The lyrics of the song, also written by Deadstar, tell about a relationship breakup.

Amanda Lear and Deadstar met in summer 2008 – their first meeting took place in a café in the 16th arrondissement of Paris where they both live. They started recording the song in November that year in Rome and Paris. The track was then previewed at Midem in 2009 to positive reaction and subsequently chosen as the lead single from Lear's album Brief Encounters. It was released through Deadstar's own independent label Just Good Music for Your Ears, also including the ballad "Secret Lover". A limited edition of the single was released with copies of one of Amanda's sketches that she did during recording sessions. The song was then remixed by Boy George and Kinky Roland, and released as a maxi single on 24 May 2010 to promote the reissue Brief Encounters Reloaded. A remix of "Doin' Fine" was included as a bonus track.

== Music video ==
The official music video for the track was filmed in April 2009 in Rome, Italy by Fabio Tibaldi at Studio 154. It pictures Amanda Lear and Deadstar performing the song in front of a white background. A video for the Boy George/Kinky Roland remix was also made in 2010.

== Track listing ==
- CD Single (2009)
1. "Someone Else's Eyes" – 4:08
2. "Secret Lover" – 2:03

video: "Someone Else's Eyes" – 4:08

- CD Promo Single (2009)
1. "Someone Else's Eyes" (Radio Edit) – 2:54
2. "Someone Else's Eyes" (All Eyes on the Dance Floor Remix Radio Edit) – 3:31
- CD Maxi Single (2010)
1. "Someone Else's Eyes" (Boy George & Kinky Roland Mix) – 5:50
2. "Someone Else's Eyes" (All Eyes on the Dance Floor Mix) – 6:45
3. "Someone Else's Eyes" (Visionary Mix) – 4:05
4. "Someone Else's Eyes" (Fully Loaded NRG Mix) – 7:33
5. "Doin' Fine" (Devil's Desire Radio Mix) – 3:36
