= André Pops =

Swedish television host (born 1972)

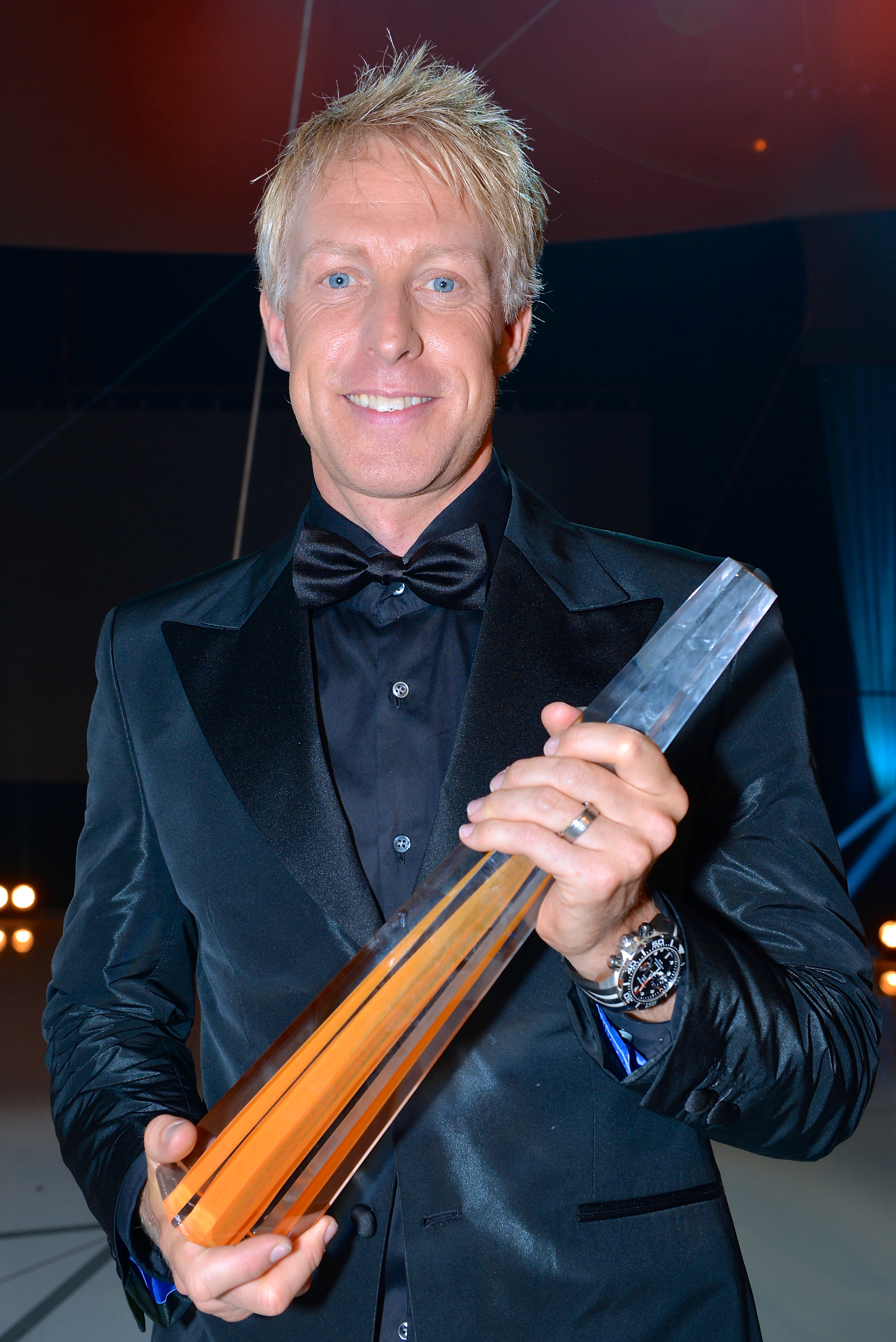
- Pops during the Kristallen Awards in August 2013
- Born: 7 October 1972 (age 54); Eskilstuna, Sweden
- Occupation: Television presenter

André Pops (born 7 October 1972) is a Swedish television presenter and sports commentator at the Swedish television station SVT. He has presented some of Sweden's most notable sporting events and has also won awards for his achievements.

== Early years ==
Pops was born and raised in Eskilstuna but moved to Stockholm in 1997. He is of Estonian descent from his father's side as his grandparents moved from Estonia to Sweden during the Second World War.

== TV-sporten ==
Pops studied journalism doing an internship at TV-sporten at SVT later on becoming a full-time host with them. He presented Vinterstudion which covered winter sports at SVT during the winter season and he also presented Olympiska vinterstudion during the 2010 Winter Olympics in Vancouver, British Columbia, Canada. During 2012, he presented the broadcasts from the UEFA Euro 2012 held jointly in Poland and Ukraine and a few weeks later the broadcast from the 2012 Summer Olympics in London, England.

== Other media ==
Pops was a sidekick in Melodifestivalen 2007 and was the spokesperson for Sweden during the voting at the Eurovision Song Contest 2007 in Finland the same year. He also presented the SVT broadcast from the Swedish national day celebrations in 2009 along with Marie Serneholt. Pops was chosen by SVT to host the Christmas celebrations on the channel in 2010. A majority of Expressen newspaper readers voted Pops as the best Swedish Christmas show host of all time.

In 2013, he released the children's book Vinterkampen at Pintxo publishers.

== Awards ==
Pops won the Kristall award for "Best sport television profile of the year" four consecutive time in 2010, 2011, 2012 and 2013 during Kristallen On 5 December 2011 Pops received the award for "Sports journalist of the Year" by Sportjournalistens Klubb Stockholm.

== Personal life ==
Pops is married to Malin Runsten and the couple have four children.
