= Suzy Aitchison =

English actress

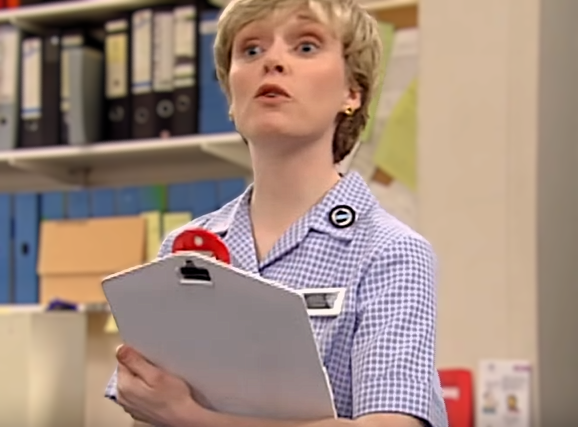
- Aitchison in "Goodnight Mr. Bean" (1995)
- Born: Susan Jane Aitchison
- Occupation: Actress
- Parents: Tim Aitchison (father); June Whitfield (mother)

Susan Jane Aitchison is an English television actress best known for her role as Susie on Jam & Jerusalem. She is the daughter of June Whitfield.

== Life ==
She graduated from the University of Birmingham with a degree in Drama & Theatre Arts. After working extensively in theatre, her mother put her in touch with Jennifer Saunders. Aitchison subsequently worked with Saunders on a French/Saunders Christmas Special, before being offered the part on Jam & Jerusalem. Aitchison also featured in several stage productions and has been praised for her performances. Previously, her body of television work has largely consisted of guest-starring roles on television programmes. Aitchison has also narrated several audiobooks for the BBC.

== Filmography ==
=== Film ===
Year	Title	Role	Notes
1987	Bloody New Year	Lesley	Also known as Time Warp Terror and Horror Hotel
2009	Innocent	Polly	

=== Television ===
Year	Title	Role	Notes
1982	Man and Superman	Davis the Maid	Television film
1985	Are You Being Served?	Susan	Series 10; episode 7: "The Pop Star"
1985	Honour, Profit & Pleasure	Mary Delaney	Television film
1986–1988	The Russ Abbot Show	Various characters	Series 1–3; 27 episodes
1987	Filthy Rich & Catflap	Jill	Episode 4
1987	It's a Hudd Hudd World	(unknown)	Television film
1988	Blankety Blank	Herself - Panellist	Series 11; episode 16
1989	EastEnders	Jenny	1 episode
1990	The Little and Large Show	(unknown)	Series 10; episode 1
1990	Up to Something!	Various roles	Episodes 1–7
1993	Casualty	Sheila Hillyer	Series 8; episode 15: "Comfort and Joy"
1994	Absolutely Fabulous	1970s Nurse	Series 2; episode 6: "Birth"
1994	The 10%ers	Trudy Hackman	Series 1; episode 7: "Sex, Death, Suicide and Adultery"
1995	Goodnight Sweetheart	TV Reporter	Series 2; episode 10: "Don't Fence Me In"
1995	Mr. Bean	Hospital Nurse	Episode 13: "Goodnight Mr. Bean"
1997	Gobble	Newsreader #1	Television film
1998	Birds of a Feather	Babs	Series 9; episode 4: "Model"
1999	The Baskervilles	April Baskerville (voice)	Mini-series 1; episode 1: "No Place Like Home"
2001	Grange Hill	Sally West	Series 24; 9 episodes
2001	My Parents Are Aliens	Mrs. Johnson	Series 3; episode 8: "Aliens Go Home"
2003	French and Saunders	Murder Victim	Episode: "French and Saunders Actually"
2004	Wilf the Witch's Dog	(voice)	Episodes 1–9, 12–19 and 21–23
2005	Like Father Like Son	Mrs. Taylor	2-part television crime drama
2006	The Family Man	Pauline	3-part medical drama
2006–2009	Jam & Jerusalem	Susie	Series 1–3; 17 episodes
2008	The Revenge Files of Alistair Fury	Miss Bird	Episodes 2, 9, 10 and 13
2009	Doctors	Lisa Knowles	Series 11; episode 144: "Growing Pains"
2010	Midsomer Murders	Alice Carver	Series 13; episode 4: "The Silent Land"
2013	Doctors	Brenda Govey	Series 14; episode 179: "The Were-Witch Project"
2013–2015	Topsy and Tim	Grandma (Jean O'Dell)	Series 1–3; 18 episodes
2015	Birds of a Feather	Assistant	Series 11; episode 6: "The Chief, the Cook, His Mum and Her Lodger"
2022	The Absolutely Fabulous June Whitfield	Herself - June's Daughter	Television Special
