= That's the Way My Heart Goes =

"That's The Way My Heart Goes"

Single by Marie Serneholt

from the album Enjoy the Ride
- B-side: "Can't Be Loved"
- Released: February 21, 2006
- Recorded: 2005
- Genre: Pop
- Length: 3:34
- Label: Sony BMG
- Songwriters: Elofsson; Westerlund; Brandén; James
- Producers: Elofsson; Westerlund; Brandén

Marie Serneholt singles chronology
"That's The Way My Heart Goes" (2006)	"I Need A House" (2006)

"That's The Way My Heart Goes" is the debut single by Swedish pop music singer Marie Serneholt, released from her debut album Enjoy the Ride on February 22, 2006.

The single debuted at No. 2 on the Swedish charts and reached No. 1 on the Digital Sales; the song was backed with a strong promotional campaign in her home country where the physical single ensured Gold Status selling over 10,000 copies and also was certified Gold for digital sales over 10,000.

It spent over four months inside the Swedish Top 60 and after six weeks out of the chart the single re-entered at No. 60 in August 2006; in Germany the single debuted at No. 34, falling out the top 40 in the next consecutive weeks, but re-entering at #30; since then, the single has spent two months inside the Top 30, peaking at No. 19.

It has been released throughout Europe; a South and North American release was expected for late 2006, but it seems that the plans were scrapped and nothing has been announced about a release date for other markets. Marie recently received the Guldmobilen Award from the Swedish mobile phone company 3 for over 10,000 ringtones sold from their website.

== Music video ==
The video was filmed in Stockholm, Sweden in January 2006 and premiered in late February in Sweden. The video shows Marie in different sets with different costumes.

The music video has two different edits - the original edit was released in Serneholt's native Sweden, while a different edit was released in other European countries (known officially as "European Version"). The original Swedish version features scenes where Serneholt is sitting on a pink unicorn, while the European version replaces these shots with cropped close-ups. The version officially released on YouTube and streaming services is the original Swedish cut, but is mis-labelled on some sites as the "European Version". The real European Version can be found on the European CD maxi single.

== Track listing ==
Swedish CD single

1. "That's The Way My Heart Goes" (Radio Version) – 3:34
2. "That's The Way My Heart Goes" (Instrumental) – 3:33

European two-track CD single

1. "That's The Way My Heart Goes" (Radio Version) – 3:36
2. "That's The Way My Heart Goes" (Michael Feiner Remix (The Attic) Radio Edit) – 3:49

European CD Maxi

1. "That's The Way My Heart Goes" (Radio Version) – 3:36
2. "That's The Way My Heart Goes" (Michael Feiner Remix (The Attic)) – 7:28
3. "That's The Way My Heart Goes" (Michael Feiner Dub) – 7:25
4. "That's The Way My Heart Goes" (Punkstar Remix) – 6:03
5. "Can't Be Loved" – 3:53
6. Video: That's The Way My Heart Goes (European Version)

== Charts ==
Chart (2006)	Peak position
Austria (Ö3 Austria Top 40)	46
Finland (Suomen virallinen lista)	19
Germany (GfK)	19
Hungary (Rádiós Top 40)	39
Netherlands (Single Top 100)	72
Sweden (Sverigetopplistan)	2
Switzerland (Schweizer Hitparade)	24
