= Brand New Love Affair (EP) =

EP by Amanda Lear
- Released: 30 November 2009
- Genre: Dance, electropop
- Length: 45:13
- Label: Edina Music
- Producer: Alain Mendiburu, Peter Wilson, Chris Richards, Mehdi Naili

Amanda Lear chronology
Brief Encounters (2009)	Brand New Love Affair (2009)	I Don't Like Disco (2012)

Professional ratings
Review scores
Source	Rating
Music Story	2.5/5 stars

"I'm Coming Up!" remix EP cover

Brand New Love Affair is an EP by French singer Amanda Lear, released in 2009 by Edina Music.

== Background ==
Brand New Love Affair comprises three original songs, two covers, two remixes, and a megamix medley of the EP's tracks. It followed Lear's previous studio album Brief Encounters, released only six weeks earlier in Italy, and focused on more dance-oriented repertoire.

Lear worked with Australian producers Peter Wilson and Chris Richards, who produced the majority of the EP's material, including their original songs "Brand New Love Affair" and "C'est la vie", originally intended for Brief Encounters, but eventually pulled from that album. Wilson has revealed that he wrote "Brand New Love Affair" especially for Amanda, as a tribute to her classic sound, and has described "C'est la vie" as influenced by Kate Ryan and ABBA.

The EP was promoted simultaneously with the Brief Encounters trilogy. "Brand New Love Affair (In the Mix)" was released as the first single, accompanied by animated music video. The 'TV Final Mix' of "I Am What I Am" was released in May 2010, following Lear's performance of the song on French television. "I'm Coming Up" was released as a maxi single in June 2010, including seven remixes by the likes of Richard Morel, Tommie Sunshine and Babydaddy of Scissor Sisters.

== Track listing ==
1. "Brand New Love Affair (In the Mix)" (Amanda Lear, Anthony Nemours, Chris Richards, Peter Wilson, Mehdi Naili, Steve Campioni) – 4:04
2. "I'm Coming Up" (Amanda Lear, Chris Richards, Peter Wilson, Derek Daniels, Edouard Germinet) – 3:30
3. "I Am What I Am" (From La Cage aux Folles Musical) (Jerry Herman) – 2:34
4. "C'est la vie" (Amanda Lear, Chris Richards, Peter Wilson) – 3:53
5. "Kiss Me, Honey, Kiss Me" (Miguelito Loveless Remix) (Michael Julien, Al Timothy) – 10:18
6. "C'est la vie" (Part 2) (Amanda Lear, Chris Richards, Peter Wilson) – 3:41
7. "Brand New Love Affair Symphony" (Amanda Lear, Chris Richards, Peter Wilson) – 5:51
8. "T-1 Love Suite" (Amanda Lear, Anthony Nemours, Chris Richards, Peter Wilson, Jerry Herman) – 11:25

== Personnel ==
- Amanda Lear – lead vocals
- Susie Ahern – backing vocals (tracks 1, 4, 6, 7)
- Steve Campioni – marketing and promotion
- Alain Mendiburu – executive record producer
- Mehdi Naili – record producer, musical arranger (track 1)
- Anthony Nemours – musical arranger (track 2)
- Chris Richards – record producer, keyboards, guitar, programming, backing vocals (track 2)
- Jean-David Thévenet – guitar
- Peter Wilson – record producer, keyboards, guitar, programming, backing vocals (tracks 1, 3, 4, 6, 7)

== Release history ==
Year	Region	Format(s)	Label
30 November 2009	France	CD, digital	Edina Music
