= Shine On Forever (Photo Frame) =

Single by Same Difference

from the album The Rest Is History
- B-side: "This Is Me"
- Released: 29 August 2010
- Recorded: 2010
- Genre: Europop, dance-pop
- Length: 3:57
- Label: PopLife
- Songwriter(s): Sean Smith, Sarah Smith, John Myers
- Producer(s): John Myers

Same Difference singles chronology
"We R One" (2008)	"Shine On Forever (Photo Frame)" (2010)

"Shine On Forever (Photo Frame)" is the first single from British pop duo Same Difference' second studio album, The Rest Is History. The single was alsonthe duo's second and last. The single was released via Digital Download on 29 August 2010, with a physical release following the next day. The single peaked at #100 on the UK Singles Chart. The single had poor critical reception, with Robert Copsey of Digital Spy claiming that the song had 'beats as hammy 'n' cheesy as a croque monsieur'.

== Background ==
After being signed to PopLife Records, much was made of Same Difference's 'reinvention', with photos of a new look Sarah and Sean being sent out to the press, and the group adopting a more open and honest interview style. 'Shine On Forever (Photo Frame)' was the first single release to showcase their new style, and continued the trend of moving away from safe, Disney style territory to a harder pop sound. The video was directed by Lauren Pushkin. It is set in a nightclub with dancers and marked a change in image for the group. Sarah and Sean each have a love interest who they share scenes with, before performing a dance routine together. The video was filmed in the Lightbox Room at London's Fire Nightclub.

== Music video ==
The music video was uploaded onto YouTube on 2 July 2010. It has over 90,000 views as of January 2016.

== Track listing ==
- CD Single
1. Shine On Forever (Photo Frame) [Radio Edit] - 3:57
2. This Is Me - 3:47
- Digital Download
1. Shine On Forever (Photo Frame) [Radio Edit] - 3:57
2. Shine On Forever (Photo Frame) [Extended Version] - 7:22
3. Shine On Forever (Photo Frame) [Riffs & Rays Club Mix] - 6:22
4. Shine On Forever (Photo Frame) [Matt Pop Remix] - 6:54
5. Shine On Forever (Photo Frame) [The Thin Red Men Mix] - 6:38
6. Shine On Forever (Photo Frame) [Riffs & Rays Radio Edit] - 4:06

== Release history ==
- UK, 30 August 2010, CD Single & Digital Download
