= We R One =

Single by Same Difference

from the album Pop
- A-side: "Don't Stop Movin'/Never Had a Dream Come True"
- Released: 24 November 2008; 18 July 2010 (re-release)
- Recorded: 2008
- Genre: Pop
- Length: 3:53
- Label: Syco
- Songwriter(s): Jörgen Elofsson, Pär Westerlund
- Producer(s): Quiz & Larossi

Same Difference singles chronology
"We R One" (2008)	"Shine On Forever (Photo Frame)" (2010)

"We R One" was the first single from British brother and sister duo Same Difference's debut studio album, Pop. The song was also the duo's debut single. The duo rose to fame when they came third place in the fourth series of ITV1 talent competition The X Factor. The duo performed the song on The X Factor on 22 November 2008, before releasing it physically two days later on 24 November 2008. The single was written by Jörgen Elofsson and Pär Westerlund, and produced by the Swedish production group Quiz & Larossi. The video for the song was filmed in Los Angeles, and features the duo in a car wash, with a large group of backing singers and dancers similar to the movies High School Musical and Grease.

== Track listing ==
CD Single

1. "We R One"
2. "Like a Miracle"

== Music video ==
The music video was uploaded onto YouTube on 3 October 2008. It shows Sean and Sarah Smith dancing in a car shop together with their friends. It has over 800,000 views as of January 2016.

== Chart performance ==
Chart (2008)	Peak position
Ireland (IRMA)	26
UK Singles (OCC)	13
