= The Rest Is History (Same Difference album) =

Studio album by Same Difference
- Released: 7 February 2011
- Recorded: 2010–2011
- Genre: Pop
- Length: 43:58
- Label: PopLife
- Producer: Sean Smith; Sarah Smith

Same Difference chronology
Pop (2008)	The Rest Is History (2011)

Singles from The Rest Is History
- 1. "Shine On Forever (Photo Frame)" Released: 29 August 2010

The Rest Is History is the second studio album by British pop duo Same Difference. The album was released on 7 February 2011. The first single from the album, "Shine On Forever (Photo Frame)", was released in August 2010, hitting the top ten in the UK Dance Chart, and peaking at #100 on the UK Singles Chart.

In January 2011, an album megamix was released to fans who signed up to Same Difference's mailing list. It was also uploaded to YouTube and has been featured on Heatworld, Popjustice & Scandipop, picking up favourable reactions from those who have heard it.

== Critical reception ==
Music critics such as Popjustice and Heatworld who heard the album and tracks from it, have given the album favourable reviews. According to messages and comments, the track that is most liked by fans and Same Difference themselves is Karma Karma which features Alcazar. The album's lead single "Shine On Forever" was panned by Robert Copsey of Digital Spy claiming that the song had 'beats as hammy 'n' cheesy as a croque monsieur'.

== Promotion ==
Same Difference have been promoting their new album on social networking sites such as Twitter and Facebook. It is available to buy from good retailers such as music company HMV, Amazon, Play.com and iTunes. Same Difference also promoted their new album by performing the title track (The Rest Is History) on This Morning on 7 February 2011, the day on which the album was also released.

== Singles ==
- Same Difference released the first single from their second album. The track was entitled "Shine On Forever (Photo Frame)" and peaked at #100 on the UK Singles Chart and reached the top ten and top 75 on the UK Dance Chart and Irish Singles Chart respectively.

== Track listing ==
No.	Title	Writer(s)	Producer(s)	Length
1.	"Souled Out"	Yamit Mamo, Mark Topham, Karl Twig	Topham and Twigg	4:09
2.	"Euphoria"	Nathan Thomas, Mark Topham, Karl Twigg	Topham and Twigg	3:37
3.	"Karma Karma (feat. Alcazar)"	Anders Hansson, Sharon Vaughn	Anders Hansson, Felix Persson, Märta Grauers	3:06
4.	"The Rest Is History"	Tony Nilsson, Hanne Sørvaag	Tony Nilsson	3:46
5.	"Shine On Forever (Photo Frame)"	John Myers, Sean Smith, Sarah Smith	John Myers	3:57
6.	"Waiting for the Moment"	Daniel Sherman, Andy Gilbert	The Flames	3:51
7.	"Best Mistake"	Nathan Thomas, Mark Topham, Karl Twigg	Topham and Twigg	3:31
8.	"This Is Me"	Ian Curnow, Georgie Dennis, Sean Smith, Sarah Smith	Ian Curnow & Dave Ford	3:46
9.	"Emotion"	Tony Nilsson	Tony Nilsson	2:56
10.	"Superstar"	Ian Curnow, Georgie Dennis, Sean Smith, Sarah Smith	Ian Curnow & Dave Ford	3:15
11.	"Heartbeat"	Pete Hammond, Georgie Dennis, Sean Smith, Sarah Smith	Pete Hammond	3:50
12.	"Broken Memories"	Luke Juby, Sean Smith, Sarah Smith	Topham and Twigg	4:23
