= Energise Records =

British record label

Energise Records Ltd
- Founded: 1993
- Genre: Pop, dance, club
- Country of origin: United Kingdom
- Location: Essex, UK
- Official website: www.energiserecords.com

Energise Records is a British independent record label established in 1993.

The label specialises in uptempo dance covers and compilations of HI-NRG/POP based releases.

The label has released records for artists such as Sean Smith, Nicki French, Peter Wilson, Hazell Dean, Jane Badler, Rozalla, Linda Martin, Paul Varney, Haywoode, Spray, Sonia and Sinitta.

== Background ==
Included in the list of artists signed is Hazell Dean who signed with the label in 2014.

== Work with artists ==
Energise Records had a desire to record a dance version of the Bonnie Tyler hit "Total Eclipse of the Heart". They decided not to go with the female singer they had in mind and approached John Springate. He phoned Nicki French with whom he had worked in the past and asked her if she wanted to give it a go. Thinking of it as a classic track, she was reluctant to play around with it. After hearing a sample of the backing track over the phone, she decided to try recording it and did so in 1993. The record became a huge Club hit in the Gay clubs and bars, and the label pressed and sold 4000 copies, with over 1000 going out to the USA where it got to #1 in the DMA Club Chart. They later met with Mike Stock and Matt Aitken. French's vocal was re-recorded, and the track was released in 1994. It reached the lower end of the charts. A remix was re-released in early 1995. It went to no 12 in the UK charts straight away and climbed from there. Later in the US, around June, it reached no. 2 in the pop chart.

== Recorded releases ==
Following his signing to Energise Records, Sean Smith had his third single released around September 2017, "Fire", which was written b Charlie Mason and Daniel Volpe. It was released as an EP with remixes by Ricardo Autobahn and FNK’D UP.

== Catalogue (selective) ==
=== 12" T series ===
12" singlesENERGY 1T
Act	Title	Release	Year	Notes
Nicki French	A1. "Total Eclipse of the Heart" (Dance Mix); B1."Pride & Passion", B2. "Total Eclipse Of The Heart" (You Sing Mix)	Energise Records ENERGY 1T	1993	First 1000 copies had white label red text the others were Red with white text
Miriam Stockley	A1. "Holding Out For A Hero"; B1. "Holding Out For A Hero" (7" Edit), B2. "I Believe In Me"	Energise Records ENERGY 2 T	1995	
NRG Faze	A1. "I Know Him So Well" (Featuring Jane McDonald, Lisa Lush; B1. " Don't Go (Don't Walk Away From Love)" (Featuring Shelly); B2. "I Know Him So Well" (Ms. Ferguson's House Of Horror Mix, It's Cuckoo!) (Featuring Jane McDonald, Lisa Lush)	Energise Records ENERGY 3T	1995	Initial 1000 Copies were on Pink Vinyl
NRG Faze Shelly and the NRG Twins*	A1. "Tonight I Celebrate My Love For You" (Featuring Lisa Lush, Sam Sorono), A2. I Can Feel The Beat (Featuring Anji K); B1. "Let Me Feel It" (Larger Than Life Mix) *	Energise Records ENERGY 4T	1995	100 white labels on Pink Vinyl 1000 on Green Vinyl
NRG Faze	"Live To Tell" "Live To Tell Edit"	Energise ENERGY 5T	1995	Limited edition, sampler, A side both sides
Chelle	A1. "If I Could Turn Back Time" (One By One 12"), A2. "If I Could Turn Back Time" (Radio Mix); B1. "Is This Love" (Saints 12"), B2. " Is This Love" (Radio Mix)	Energise Records ENERGY 7T	1996	
Magic Hands	Magic Hands EP; Logo Side: A1. MacArthur Park" (Saints 12" Mix), A2. "In Your Eyes" (Saints 7" Mix); This side: AA1. "Gonna Make You Mine" (12" Glamour Mix)	Energise Records ENERGY 8T	1996	
Krunchie	A1. "I'm So Excited" (Red Hand Gang Mix); B2. "I'm So Excited" (Saint's Full Frontal Mix), B2. "I'm So Excited" (Saint's Late Night Mix)	Energise Records ENERGY 9T	1996	
NRG Faze	I Know Him So Well; A1. "I Know Him So Well" (96 Grandmaster Mix), A2. " I Know Him So Well" (7" Radio Edit); B1. " I Know Him So Well" (Bits And Bobs Mix), B2. "Take Your Time"	Energise Records ENERGY 10T	1996	

== See also ==
- List of record labels
