= La Bête et la Belle =

Single by Amanda Lear

from the album I Don't Like Disco
- Released: September 2, 2011
- Genre: Electropop, pop rock
- Length: 3:21
- Label: Little Boom
- Songwriters: Louise Prey, Joe Moskow, Amanda Lear
- Producers: Steve Campioni, Alain Mendiburu

Amanda Lear singles chronology
"I Don't Like Disco" (2011)	"La Bête et la Belle" (2011)	"Love at First Sight" (2012)

Music video
- "La Bête et la Belle" on YouTube

"La Bête et la Belle" (French for "The Beast and the Beauty") is a song by French singer Amanda Lear from her album I Don't Like Disco, released in 2011 by Little Boom Records. It attracted attention due to its music video which pictured nudity and voyeurism.

== Song information ==
The song was written by Louise Prey of Ping Pong Bitches, Joe Moskow of Reverend and The Makers, and Amanda Lear herself. It was arranged by Gaël Brusseleers and produced by Steve Campioni and Alain Mendiburu. It is an electropop song with pop rock elements whose English-French lyrics tell about phone sex.

A snippet of the track was shared at the beginning of August 2011 to fans' positive reactions. The full song was released as the third advance single from Lear's album I Don't Like Disco in September, only days after the album's title song. In April 2012, a remix EP was released, followed by a new remix by Andy Bell of Erasure and DJ Yiannis, with Bell's additional vocals. Some of the new remixes appeared on the deluxe edition of I Don't Like Disco.

== Music video ==
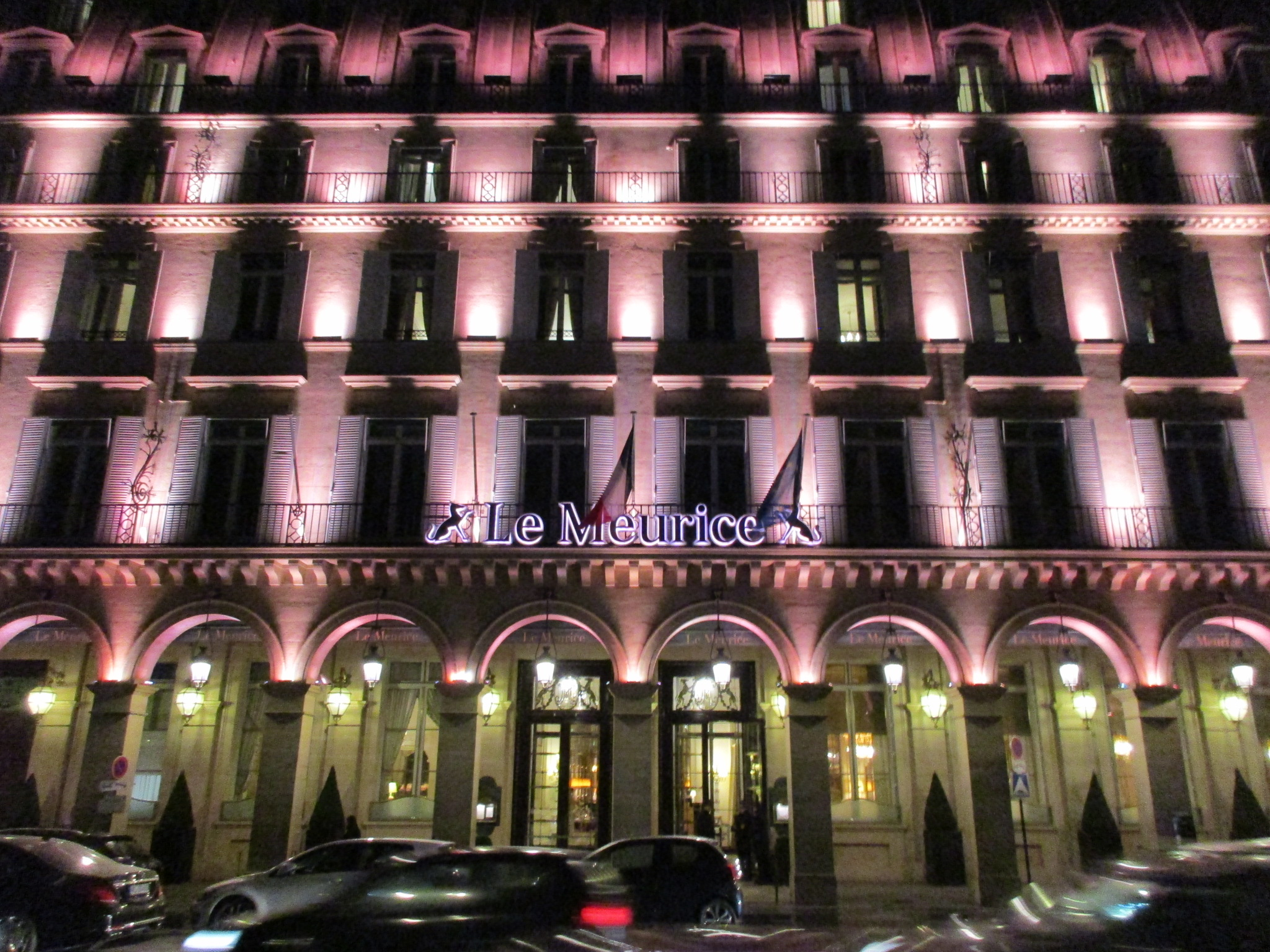
Le Meurice hotel, Paris, where the music video was filmed

The music video for the song was directed by Fred Gasimov. The filming took place in Le Meurice hotel in Paris on 16 January 2012, in the same room where Salvador Dalí used to stay. It begins with Amanda Lear getting off the limousine, clad in fur coat and sunglasses, and entering the hotel amid paparazzi taking photos of her. She makes her way to the room where she is then seen rolling on bed in scant underwear and feather boa. She is singing the song into a telephone as if having an erotic talk with someone while a surveillance operator is watching her through CCTV in his office and masturbating.

The video was preceded by a series of teaser photographs and video trailers, before premiering on YouTube at midnight on 28 January 2012. It amassed over 10,000 views within first 24 hours. The clip was blocked on YouTube for a short time before being made available again for over-18 users only. The sexually charged nature of the video caused controversy and some stated that it was inappropriate of Lear to adopt such an erotic image due to her age. The clip has been compared to Madonna's videos "Justify My Love" and "Hollywood" as well as the 1993 erotic thriller Sliver. A remix video for the RLS version was also made.

== Track listing ==
- Digital Single
1. "La Bête et la Belle" – 3:21
- Digital Single (RLS Edit Mix)
1. "La Bête et la Belle" (RLS Edit Mix) – 3:17
- Digital Maxi Single (Remixes)
1. "La Bête et la Belle" (RLS Edit Mix) – 3:17
2. "La Bête et la Belle" (Bruce Leers Wild Edit) – 3:51
3. "La Bête et la Belle" – 3:21
4. "La Bête et la Belle" (RLS Extended Mix) – 5:11
5. "La Bête et la Belle" (Bruce Leers Wild Extended) – 5:14
6. "La Bête et la Belle" (MGK Extended Remix) – 5:47
- Digital Maxi Single (Monster Mix EP)
1. "La Bête et la Belle" (Club Mix Edit) (feat. Andy Bell & DJ Yiannis) – 6:24
2. "La Bête et la Belle" (Dub Mix Edit) (feat. Andy Bell & DJ Yiannis) – 6:40
3. "La Bête et la Belle" (Radio Edit) (feat. Andy Bell & DJ Yiannis) – 3:46
