= Enjoy the Ride (Marie Serneholt album) =

Enjoy The Ride

Studio album by Marie Serneholt
- Released: March 29, 2006
- Recorded: 2005 in Sweden
- Genre: Pop, Europop
- Length: 36:01
- Label: Sony BMG
- Producer: Elofsson; Westerlund; Brandén

Professional ratings
Review scores
Source	Rating
Teentoday.co.uk	4/5 stars

Enjoy The Ride is the debut studio album from Swedish pop music singer Marie Serneholt, led by the first single and number two hit "That's The Way My Heart Goes". The album was released on March 29, 2006, debuting at number nine in Sweden, but falling quickly on the charts. The album's second single, "I Need A House", did nothing for the album's success despite peaking at number 40 on the Swedish Singles Chart and number two on the Swedish Download Chart. The album's third single "Oxygen" was premiered on radio in mid-October and the video was premiered on October 26. The single has been released as a digital download in Sweden but no official release date has been announced for a release on CD.

Serneholt was said to be preparing for the international release of the album in Germany, Switzerland and other European countries, but plans for worldwide distribution never came to fruition, aside from the album being released in Taiwan as a limited edition.

== Background ==
Serneholt knew that she wanted to embark on a solo career after A*Teens' parted ways, but wanted to absorb all the impressions of the past years first. She needed the right people to work with as well as the right material.

Serneholt first contacted Jörgen Elofsson several years ago. At that point, however, Elofsson's schedule was full, and Marie wasn't yet sure in what direction to take her career. And in 2005 she felt she had a vision and called him again. This time, all the pieces fell into place. Elofsson had just started collaborating with two relatively young and unknown producers, Richard Brandén and Pär Westerlund.

Serneholt decided she wanted to make a Pop album, Elofsson was relieved, There are so many artists that suddenly want to start working with R&B with cool beats or riff-based rock.

Elofsson is listed as co-writer of every track on the album. Besides writing with his co-producers, he has also co-written with the legendary Nicky Chinn and Swedish colleague Andreas Carlsson among others.

Elofsson started his own record company Planet Six, a part of Sony BMG. With this, Serneholt and Elofsson could work undisturbed and at their own pace, with no involvement of any record companies, media or outside opinions. Elofsson had saved choice tidbits, songs that would have been guaranteed hits with established artists.

== Release ==
The third single, "Oxygen", was released on October 9, 2006. After speculation about Marie's third single, promotional copies of the song were sent to Swedish radios in the second week of October. The video was premiered on 26 October on Swedish Music Channels. The song had already been released for digital download on 9 October. No physical release was made for this single. The song peaked at number seventy-six, failing to chart inside the Top 60. The video was filmed in Stockholm, Sweden, on 22 September and it was premiered on 26 October. Serneholt posted on her official blog: "This Monday I received my first prize here in Sweden:-) it is called Guldmobilen, and you get that prize when your song's been downloaded more than 10,000 times from the 3s portal. So THANK YOU!!!:-) A big hug to all of you! //Your Marie" As the video starts, Serneholt appears to be naked, singing the song on her bed. She puts her dress on, goes out of her house, and starts to fly. The video also shows Serneholt walking on the road and flying above the sea and singing on the beach. The video was filmed on location and uses special effects.

== Track listing ==
1. "Enjoy the Ride" – 3:10
2. "Wasted Love" – 3:15
3. "That's the Way My Heart Goes" – 3:34
4. "I Need a House" – 3:00
5. "Beyond Tonight" – 4:20
6. "I Love Making Love in the Morning" – 3:31
7. "The Boy I Used to Know" – 2:50
8. "Calling All Detectives" – 3:56
9. "Can't Be Loved" – 3:53
10. "Oxygen" – 4:23

== Charts ==
Chart (2006)	Peak position
German Albums (Offizielle Top 100)	75
Swedish Albums (Sverigetopplistan)	9
Swiss Albums (Schweizer Hitparade)	78

== Charts ==
"Oxygen"
Chart (2006)	Peak position
Swedish Top 60 Singles	76
