= Marie Serneholt =

Swedish singer and model (born 1983)

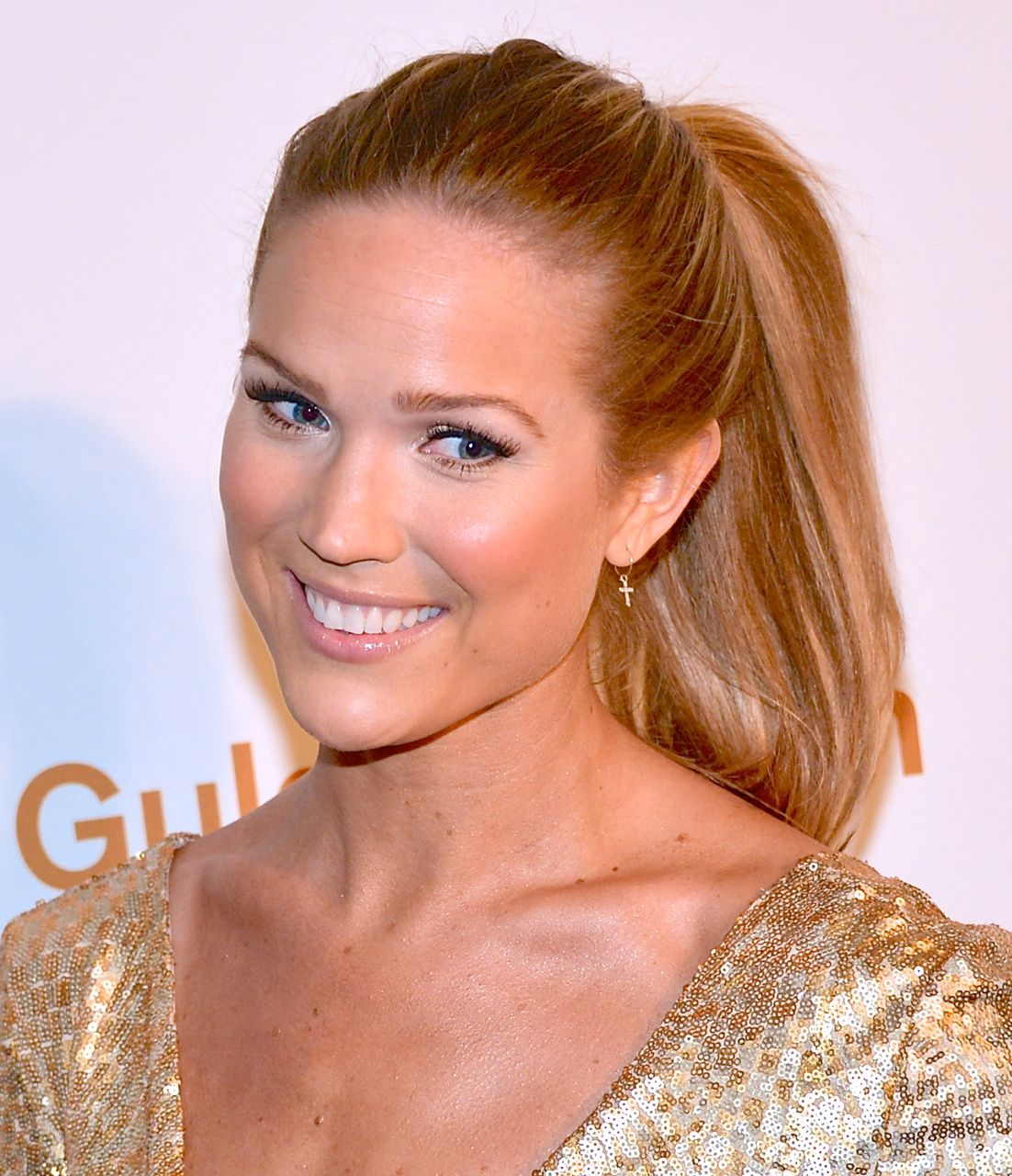
- Serneholt at the 48th Guldbagge Awards in 2013

Background information
- Born: Marie Eleonor Serneholt; 11 July 1983 (age 43); Stockholm, Sweden
- Genres: Pop, Europop
- Occupations: Singer; model
- Instrument: Vocals
- Years active: 1998–present
- Labels: Planet Six, Sony BMG
- Member of: A-Teens
- Website: blogg.mama.nu/marieserneholt/

Marie Eleonor Serneholt (Swedish pronunciation: [maˈriː ˈsæ̂ːɳɛˌhɔlt]; born 11 July 1983) is a Swedish singer and model. She is a member of the Swedish pop band A*Teens which reunited in 2024, and briefly pursued a solo recording career after the band disbanded in 2004.

== Career ==
=== A*Teens (1998–2006) ===
In 1998, Serneholt signed a recording deal with Stockholm Records (part of Universal Music Group) along with her bandmates Sara Lumholdt, Dhani Lennevald, and Amit Sebastian Paul. Together they performed as the A*Teens. In 1999, they released their first single, a cover of Swedish pop group ABBA's Mamma Mia. The single topped the charts in Sweden for eight consecutive weeks, and achieved international success.

By 2000, the A*Teens' first album, The ABBA Generation, had sold two million copies, and they became one of the most internationally successful Swedish pop bands. By 2001, the group had sold more than six million albums. In 2004, they released a Greatest Hits album before disbanding.

=== Enjoy the Ride (2005–2008) ===
In 2005, Serneholt was picked as the face of the Maybelline cosmetics line in Scandinavia. She also gave her voice for the Swedish versions of the movies Robots and Herbie: Fully Loaded.

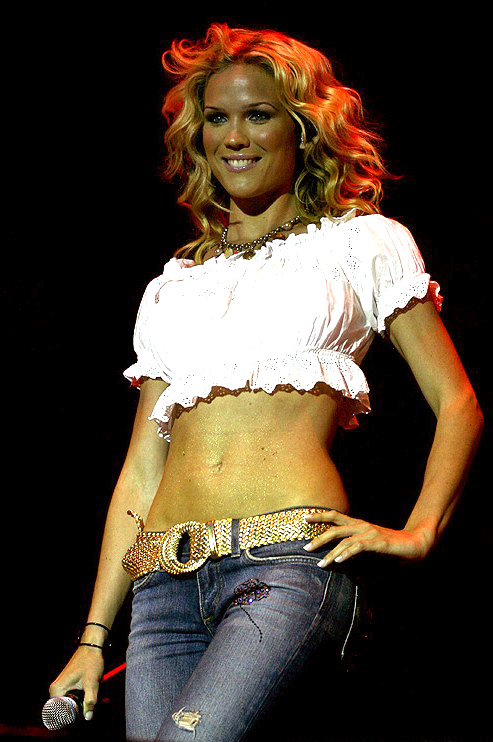
Serneholt at Gatufesten in Sundsvall, Sweden, in July 2006

That year, Serneholt began working with songwriter Jörgen Elofsson. Elofsson created the label Planet Six (a part of Sony BMG), and Serneholt signed her first recording deal as a solo artist. In February 2006, Serneholt's first single, "That's The Way My Heart Goes", premiered on Swedish radio. The single debuted at No. 2 on the Swedish Charts and reached No. 1 on the official Swedish Digital Downloads Chart, being certified Gold on 19 May 2006.

The album Enjoy the Ride was released on 29 March 2006, debuting at No. 9 in her home country. In May 2006, Serneholt started a promotional tour in Germany coinciding with the German release of her album. She embarked on a Radio Station's Concert Tour of Sweden and Finland. In June, Serneholt released her second single, "I Need a House", which debuted at No. 2 on the Swedish Digital Downloads Chart, but reached only No. 40 on the Swedish singles chart. The single was released in Europe in September 2006. On 19 August 2006, Serneholt performed at Voice '06 in the Kungsträdgården park in Stockholm.

=== 2009–present ===
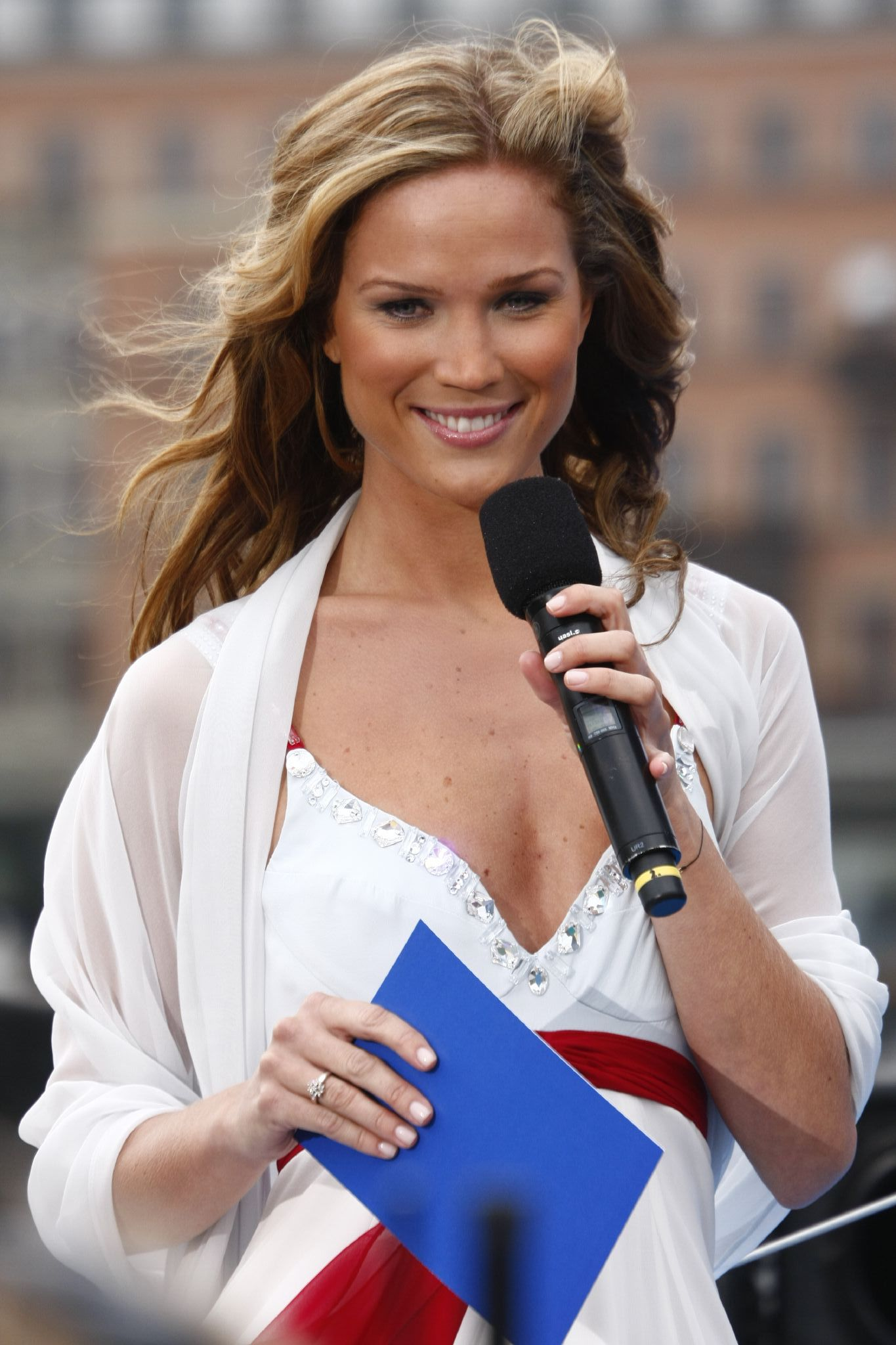
Serneholt in 2009 hosting Sveriges Television's broadcast of the National Day of Sweden

On 3 December 2008, SVT confirmed Serneholt as the third of four wildcard artists for Melodifestivalen 2009. On 7 February 2009, during the first semi-final heat, she performed her new single, "Disconnect Me". She placed sixth of eight and did not advance to the finals. "Disconnect Me" (which also served as the first single from Serneholt's second album) was released on 25 February 2009.

She worked with Filip Cederholm on the album photoshoots and artwork. She co-hosted Sveriges Television's broadcast of the National Day of Sweden celebrations in 2009 alongside André Pops.

In October 2009, it was announced that she would appear in a Swedish-language version of the musical Grease, resulting in fans questioning whether a follow-up to Enjoy the Ride would ever be released.

Alongside Rickard Olsson, she co-hosted the semi-finals and finals of the Melodifestivalen 2011 contest. In December 2011, she released a new single, "Himlen i min famn", under Warner Music Sweden. She participated in the first semi-final of Melodifestivalen 2012 which was held on 4 February 2012 in Vida Arena, Växjö. She sang the song "Salt & Pepper", composed by Lina Eriksson, Mårten Eriksson, and Figge Boström. She finished sixth in the first round of voting and so was eliminated from the competition. Serneholt presented the Sjuan's channel bingo show Bingolotto for two seasons in 2013–14.

Serneholt was announced as one of the judges of the Swedish version of popular talent show The X Factor, which premiered on 9 September 2012. She competed as one of the celebrity dancers in Let's Dance 2015, broadcast on TV4, where she was the runner-up. In August 2015, she co-hosted the Swedish game show Fångarna på Fortet (alongside Gunde Svan) at Fort Boyard for TV4, after Agneta Sjödin was injured in a bicycle accident. In October 2015 it was announced that Serneholt would host the baking show Det stora tårtslaget on Sjuan in 2016.

== Personal life ==
Serneholt is married to Fredric Palmqvist and has twin boys.

== Discography ==
=== Albums ===
Marie Serneholt studio albums
| Title | Details | Peak chart positions | | |
| Title | Details | SWE | GER | SWI |
|---|---|---|---|---|
| Enjoy the Ride | Release date: 29 March 2006; Label: Sony BMG; Formats: CD, music download | 9 | 75 | 78 |

=== Singles ===
Marie Serneholt singles
| Year | Title | Peak positions | | | | | Album |
| Year | Title | SWE | AUT | FIN | GER | SWI | Album |
|---|---|---|---|---|---|---|---|
| 2006 | "That's the Way My Heart Goes" | 2 | 46 | 19 | 19 | 24 | Enjoy the Ride |
| 2006 | "I Need a House" | 40 | — | — | 49 | 72 | Enjoy the Ride |
| 2006 | "Oxygen" | 76 | — | — | — | — | Enjoy the Ride |
| 2009 | "Disconnect Me" | 46 | — | — | — | — | Non-album release |
| 2012 | "Salt & Pepper" | — | — | — | — | — | Non-album release |

== Tours ==
For Marie’s tours with A*Teens, see the A*Teens tours section.

- German Promotional Tour (2006)

| Date (2006) | City | Country | Venue |
|---|---|---|---|
| May 6 | Stuttgart | Germany | Bravo Super Show |
| May 8 | Berlin | Germany | VIVA Live! |
| May 9 | Magdeburg | Germany | Radio SAW |
| May 10 | Cologne | Germany | Meet & Greet |
| May 24 | Berlin | Germany | BRAVO Magazine |
| May 26 | Bremen | Germany | The Dome 38 |
| May 27 | Kassel | Germany | Radio FFH Hit Tour |
