= Yell! =

British pop duo

- Origin: United Kingdom
- Genres: Pop, hi-NRG
- Years active: 1989–1991
- Labels: Fanfare Records
- Past members: Paul Varney; Daniel James

Yell! were a British pop duo who had a hit single in 1990 with a cover of "Instant Replay".

== Overview ==
Yell! consisted of singers Daniel James and Paul Varney. In 1989, they both met manager Jeff Chegwin and decided to form the group. They were signed by Simon Cowell to Fanfare Records. The group's first single, a cover version of Dan Hartman's 1970s hit, "Instant Replay", was produced by Nigel Wright and re-mixed by Pete Hammond from PWL. In January 1990, it entered the UK singles chart and peaked at No.10 in February, giving the duo attention from the pop press. The group then embarked on a promotional tour of Europe.

Daniel James had previously been known as Colin Heywood and he had been a Children's BBC presenter who had presented the live magazine show 'But First This'. He had also appeared as a contestant in the BBC's Song for Europe competition and played Fred in the children's ITV drama series 'Henry's Leg'.

The band's follow up, "One Thing Leads to Another", was produced by Stock Aitken Waterman (SAW), and reached number 81. A cover of "Let's Go Round Again" (produced by Nigel Wright) released in September 1990 reached number 78. In 1991 the duo released an album in Asia called Let's Go! which contained 3 ballads written by Daniel James. Soon after this, the duo went their separate ways. Daniel signed a publishing deal with George Michael's music publisher Dick Leahy and recorded an album. After this Daniel returned to his acting roots and appeared in an Off-Broadway play. He played a CSI in an episode of the NBC series Passions. He also played a rock drummer in the American Web Series 'Apartment for Eight'. In the UK he had a role in an episode of the BBC long running series Eastenders. Other UK TV roles include guest lead roles in Coronation Street, Casualty and Doctors. Varney went on to release some solo singles which proved unsuccessful and then composed the UK entry for the 1999 Eurovision Song Contest, "Say It Again".

== Discography ==
=== Album ===
List of albums, with selected details
Title	Details
Let's Go!	Released: 1991; Format: CD, LP, cassette, Label: Victor

=== Singles ===
List of singles, with selected chart positions
Title	Year	Chart positions	Album
Title	Year	UK	Album
"Instant Replay"	1989	10	Let's Go
"One Thing Leads to Another"	1990	81	Let's Go
"Let's Go Round Again"	1990	78	Let's Go
