= Peter Wilson (singer) =

- Born: 9 March 1973 (age 53); Melbourne, Australia
- Genres: Eurodance, dancepop, synthpop
- Occupations: Singer, songwriter, producer
- Years active: 1994–present
- Label: Energise Records
- Website: https://peterwilsonhq.com

Peter Wilson (born 9 March 1973 in Melbourne) is an Australian singer, songwriter and producer. His work is heavily influenced by the 1980s Italo disco and the PWL pop sound.

Wilson released a string of singles in Australia between 1994 and 1999, scoring a few hits with the songs "Into the Night" (a cover of the Benny Mardones song) and "I Wanna Dance". However, he retired to focus on writing tracks for other acts such as Amanda Lear and Samantha Fox.

In 2007, Wilson returned with the album Follow Me, released by the UK dance label Klone Records.

In 2010, Wilson signed to another UK label, Energise Records. He got the opportunity to work with the Stock Aitken Waterman associates, engineers Dave Ford and Ian Curnow, who co-wrote and produced tracks on Wilson's next album release Stereo, released in 2011.

In 2024, Wilson announced his departure from Energise Records, citing that the forthcoming album "Touch", and its accompanying singles, would be his final releases with the label.

Wilson has worked with producers such as Matt Pop, Pete Hammond, Marco Rochowski, Larry Forsberg, Italoconnection, Michael Jay and A.P. Mono.

As a songwriter and producer, Wilson has also worked with Amanda Lear, Carol Jiani, Haywoode, Nicki French, Sammy Paul, O!Dorian, Retropenu. Autumnal Madness and Sabrina.

In November 2024, Wilson announced he’d signed with Polish independent label Analog Language to release his 12th studio album "A Different Picture", which was released in September 2025.

== Discography ==
=== Studio albums ===
List of studio albums, with selected details
Title	Details
Follow Me	Released: September 2007; Format: CD, digital; Label: Klone Records (CDKOPY 175)
Stereo	Released: July 2011; Format: CD, digital; Label: Energise Records (Phaze 1009)
Laser Light	Released: July 2012; Format: CD, digital; Label: Energise Records (Phaze 1013)
Pulsation	Released: August 2013; Format: CD, 2×CD, digital; Label: Energise Records (Phaze 1016)
Utopia	Released: August 2015; Format: CD, 2×CD, digital; Label: Energise Records (Phaze 1020)
Overdrive	Released: 2017; Format: CD, 2×CD, digital; Label: Energise Records (Phaze 1027)
The Passion and the Flame	Released: July 2018; Format: CD, 2×CD, digital; Label: Energise Records (Phaze 1031)
Change of Heart	Released: September 2019; Format: CD, 2×CD, LP, digital; Label: Energise Records (Phaze 1037)
Electricity	Released: March 2021; Format: CD, 2×CD, LP, digital; Label: Energise Records (Phaze 1041)
The Great Unknown	Released: July 2022; Format: CD, 2×CD, LP, digital; Label: Energise Records (Phaze 1043)
Touch	Released: June 2024; Format: CD, digital; Label: Energise Records
A Different Picture	Released: 05 September 2025; Format: CD, digital; Label: Analog Language

=== Compilation albums ===
List of compilation albums, with selected details
Title	Details
Shake It Up	Released: December 2015; Format: CD, digital; Label: Energise Records (Phaze 1021)
Time Machine Vol 1	Released: 29 May 2023; Format: CD, 2×CD, digital; Label: Energise Records (Phaze 1046)

=== Extended plays ===
List of EPs, with selected details
Title	Details
Saw The Signs	Released: 14 September 2023; Format: CD, digital; Label: Energise Records
We Are the Night	Released: 14 September 2023; Format: CD, digital; Label: Energise Records

=== Charted singles ===
Year	Title	Peak chart positions	Album
Year	Title	AUS	Album
1994	"I Wanna Dance"	171	non-album singles
1995	"Move"	118	non-album singles
1995	"Into the Night"	139	non-album singles
