= Tendance =

Studio album (reissue of Heart) by Amanda Lear
- Released: 10 February 2003
- Recorded: 2001–2002
- Genre: Pop, dance
- Language: English, French, Italian, German, Spanish
- Label: Le Marais Prod., Sony Music
- Producer: FX Costello, Laurent Wolf

Amanda Lear chronology
Heart (2001)	Tendance (2003)	Forever Glam! (2005)

Professional ratings
Review scores
Source	Rating
Bloom	mixed

Tendance (French for Trend) is a reissue of French singer Amanda Lear's studio album Heart. The album was released in 2003 by Le Marais Prod. and Sony Music.

== Background ==
Tendance is an expanded re-release of the 2001 studio album Heart, taking its title from one of the songs, which in turn was named after a fashion and trends show hosted by Lear on French channel Match TV. Because of re-titling and significant changes to the track listing, Tendance is considered a separate release in Amanda Lear discography.

This edition omits "Manuel do guerreido da luz" but adds three other tracks: the oriental remix of the single "Love Boat", entitled "Rainbow Love Boat", her 2002 duet with Belgian boyband Get Ready!, "Beats of Love", a cover version of the 1984 hit single by Belgian band Nacht und Nebel, and "Cocktail d'amore", the theme tune to Lear's 2002 Italian TV series of the same name, a top-rated nostalgic show celebrating music of the 1980s on which she interviewed some of Italy's most famous stars. The tracks "Cocktail d'amore" and "L'importante è finire" were originally written by Cristiano Malgioglio for Stefania Rotolo and Mina, respectively. Malgioglio then recorded his versions of both songs on his 1983 album Bellissime which also included "Ho fatto l'amore con me", a song he had written for Lear's 1980 album Diamonds for Breakfast. Tendance also features the English version of the track "Vol de nuit", re-titled "Travel by Night", and the Pumpin' Dolls remix of the single "I Just Wanna Dance Again", which had been used in the music video for the song. The album retains the cover picture and artwork of the second edition of Heart.

The album was re-released on digital platforms in September 2019, excluding three bonus tracks from the original CD edition, but adding the unreleased song "Phoenix" as well as the French version of "Travel by Night".

== Track listing ==
=== Original release ===
1. "Love Boat" (Charles Fox, Paul Williams) – 3:11
2. "Do U Wanna See It?" (Laurent Wolf, Thierry Willems, Amanda Lear) – 3:51
3. "Tendance" (FX Costello, Thierry Willems, Amanda Lear) – 4:16
4. "Lili Marleen" (Norbert Schultze, Tommie Connor) – 3:47
5. "Hier encore (Yesterday When I Was Young)" (Charles Aznavour, Herbert Kretzmer) – 3:55
6. "Porque me gusta" (FX Costello, Natacha Amal, Amanda Lear) – 4:00
7. "I Just Wanna Dance Again" (Pumpin' Dolls Radio Edit) (Laurent Wolf, Thierry Willems) – 3:52
8. "Travel by Night" (FX Costello, Thierry Willems, Laurent Ries) – 4:17
9. "L'Invitation au voyage" (FX Costello, Charles Baudelaire) – 3:59
10. "The Look of Love" (Burt Bacharach, Hal David) – 4:02
11. "L'importante è finire" (Cristiano Malgioglio, Alberto Anelli) – 3:18
12. "Rainbow Love Boat" (Oriental Mix) (FX Costello, Thierry Willems, Amanda Lear) – 4:56
13. "Cocktail d'amore" (Original Mix 2002) (Cristiano Malgioglio, Corrado Castellari, Marcello Mancini) – 4:14
14. "Beats of Love" (Radio Edit) (With Get Ready!) (Patrick Marina Nebel) – 3:40

=== Digital edition ===
1. "Love Boat" (Charles Fox, Paul Williams) – 3:12
2. "Do U Wanna See It?" (Laurent Wolf, Thierry Willems, Amanda Lear) – 3:51
3. "Tendance" (FX Costello, Thierry Willems, Amanda Lear) – 4:15
4. "Lili Marleen" (Norbert Schultze, Tommie Connor) – 3:48
5. "Hier encore" (Charles Aznavour, Herbert Kretzmer) – 3:54
6. "Porque me gusta" (FX Costello, Natacha Amal, Amanda Lear) – 4:00
7. "I Just Wanna Dance Again" (Pumpin' Dolls Radio Edit) (Laurent Wolf, Thierry Willems) – 3:51
8. "Vol de nuit" (FX Costello, Thierry Willems) – 4:19
9. "The Look of Love" (Burt Bacharach, Hal David) – 4:02
10. "L'Invitation au voyage" (FX Costello, Charles Baudelaire) – 3:58
11. "L'importante è finire" (Cristiano Malgioglio, Alberto Anelli) – 3:20
12. "Phoenix" (Amanda Lear, FX Costello) – 4:50
13. "Travel by Night" (FX Costello, Thierry Willems, Laurent Ries) – 4:17

== Personnel ==
- Amanda Lear – lead vocals
- Patrick Bacqueville – trombone
- Nicolas Baudino – flute, saxophone
- François Biesan – trumpet
- Farhat Bouallagui – violin
- Christophe Challut – hair styling
- Christophe Dubois – drums
- Judith Flessel-Toto – backing vocals
- Sandrine Foguère – backing vocals
- FX Costello – record producer, guitar, bass, keyboards, backing vocals
- Get Ready! – lead vocals in "Beats of Love"
- Cécile Maestre – backing vocals
- Stefano Meghenzani – piano, Rhodes, accordion
- Bernard Ortoli – percussion
- Denis Taranto – photography
- Laurent Wolf – record producer

== Release history ==
Year	Region	Format(s)	Label
10 February 2003	Europe	CD	Le Marais Prod., Sony Music
1 September 2019	Worldwide	Download, streaming	Kerwi
