= Statue of Mickey Mantle =

Statue of Mickey Mantle may refer to:

- The Commerce Comet (sculpture), a statue of Mickey Mantle
- Statue of Mickey Mantle (Oklahoma City)
