= Swoop =

Swoop may refer to:

== Entertainment ==
- Swoop (Australian band), a 1991 rock, funk and disco band
- Swoop (Belgian band), a 2001 party band
- Swoop (video game), 1982 clone of Galaxian
- The Swoop!, a novel by P. G. Wodehouse
- Swoop (Transformers), a Transformers character

== Mascots ==
- Swoop (Eastern Michigan University), mascot for the Eastern Michigan Eagles
- Swoop (Eastern Washington University), mascot for Eastern Washington University's athletics
- Swoop (Miami University), mascot for Miami University
- Swoop (Philadelphia Eagles), mascot of the Philadelphia Eagles
- Swoop (University of Utah), mascot for the University of Utah
- Swoop the Silverhawk, a mascot for the South Bend Cubs

== Other uses ==
- Swoop (airline), Canadian ultra low-cost airline
- Swoops, a candy manufactured by The Hershey Company
- Swoop bike
- Swooping (skydiving), a type of canopy piloting
- Solar Wind Observations Over the Poles of the Sun, an instrument aboard the Ulysses spacecraft

== See also ==
- Swoope (surname)
- Słup (disambiguation), toponym that sounds like swoop
