= Love Boat (song) =

"Love Boat Theme"
- Side A of US single

Single by Jack Jones

from the album Nobody Does It Better
- B-side: "Ready to Take a Chance Again"
- Released: 1979
- Genre: Disco
- Length: 2:57
- Label: MGM, Polydor
- Songwriters: Charles Fox, Paul Williams
- Producer: Ken Barnes

Jack Jones singles chronology
"Like Roses" (1978)	"Love Boat Theme" (1979)	"I Could Have Been a Sailor" (1979)

Alternative release
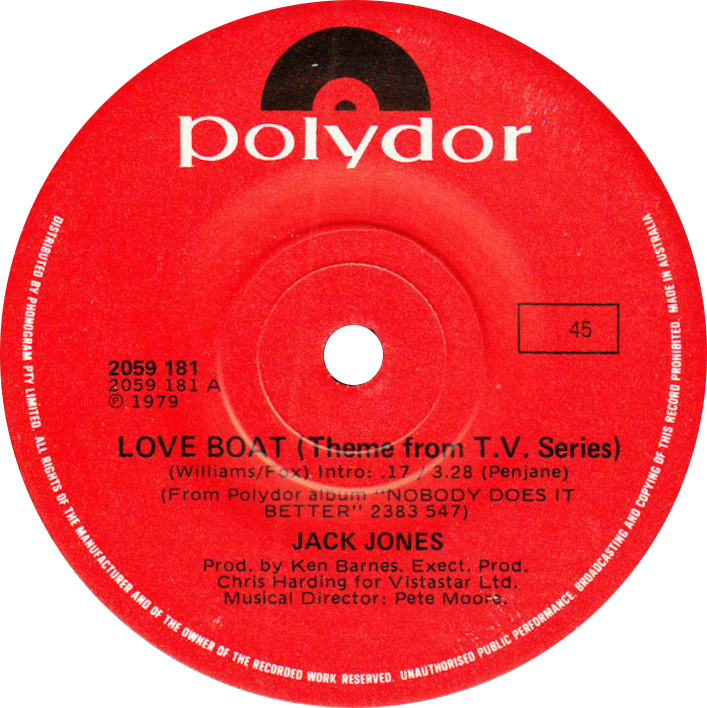
- Side A of Australian single

"Love Boat" (also known as "Love Boat Theme") is a 1977 song performed by American singer and actor Jack Jones, used as the theme song in American television series The Love Boat, when it was in its first nine season-run on TV from 1977 to 1986, on ABC. It was later covered by numerous artists.

== Song information ==
The song was composed by Charles Fox, and the lyrics by Paul Williams. It was recorded as the theme song for the popular American TV series The Love Boat (later known in its short-lived two season revival as Love Boat: The Next Wave from 1998 to 1999), broadcast between 1977 and 1986 and originally aired on ABC. Jones's version was used in all seasons apart from the ninth, where it was replaced by Dionne Warwick's version.

Jones released the track as a single in 1979 as "Love Boat Theme", with a cover of the Barry Manilow song "Ready to Take a Chance Again" on side B. In the same year, the song appeared on Jones's album Nobody Does It Better, this time billed as "The Love Boat".

== Track listing ==
- 7" Single (US/UK)

A. "Love Boat Theme" – 2:57
B. "Ready to Take a Chance Again" – 2:51

- 7" Single (Australia)

A. "Love Boat" (Theme from T.V. Series)
B. "I Could Have Been a Sailor"

== Charts ==
Chart (1980)	Peak position
US Adult Contemporary (Billboard)	37

== Cover versions ==
- Actress and singer Charo, who guest starred in The Love Boat series, recorded the song for her 1978 album Olé Olé and released as a single in 1980.
- The aforementioned singer Jack Jones recorded the song in 1979 on his album The Full Life. It was released as a single soon after, and became his last charting song, reaching No. 37 on the Billboard Adult Contemporary chart.
- In 1981, Jacques Raymond released a cover of the song which peaked at no. 27 in his native Belgium the following year.
- Dionne Warwick's version was used as the theme song in the last season of The Love Boat (1985–1986).
- Dutch singer Mike Peterson recorded a house version in 1996 under the alias The Pacific Prince. In the Netherlands, the single reached no. 17 for two weeks in November 1996. The Pacific Prince is considered a one-hit wonder as he never released a follow-up single.
- Amanda Lear covered the song on her 2001 comeback album Heart and released it as the lead single.
- Kylie Minogue performed a medley of the song and her track "Loveboat" on her 2008 tour KylieX2008.
- Olivia Newton-John recorded a cover of the song for the soundtrack to the 2011 film A Few Best Men.
- A cover by Frankie Bostello is playable in the videogame Just Dance 2014.
- Belgian band Swoop recorded the song for their 2015 album We gaan ervoor.
- A cover version was recorded and used as the opening credits song for the American & Australian versions of the Reality Competition Love Boat spin-off, The Real Love Boat with the song being sung by the show's respective hosts - with Rebecca Romijn and Jerry O'Connell singing on the American Real Love Boat and Darren McMullen singing on the Australian Real Love Boat.

== In popular culture ==
Jack Jones lip-syncs the song in Airplane II (1982), appearing in a cameo as a lounge singer as Ted escapes from the hospital.

In the film Summer Rental (1985), Rip Torn's character Scully sings the song, describing it is as "an old sea ditty me mother taught me".

In the film Demolition Man (1993), the song was played by Sandra Bullock as a romantic background music in her apartment before the "virtual sex" between her and Sylvester Stallone.

On the "Singing the Blues" episode of Living Single (1995), a singer performs the song during amateur night at a restaurant the friends are visiting. While most of the group aren't too impressed with the singer, a jubilant Synclaire chimes in and performs along with him.

In the season 6 South Park episode “Red Hot Catholic Love” (2002), there is a parody of the Love Boat theme song, called “The Catholic Boat”. It also parodies the opening showed in the Love Boat TV show.

The season 2 Phineas and Ferb episode titled, "That Sinking Feeling" (2009) includes a parody of the song titled "Boat of Romance" sung by Love Boat singer Jack Jones with The Love Boat intro sequence being parodied.

The season 35 The Simpsons episode titled, "Murder, She Boat" (2023) includes a parody of the song titled "Nerd Boat" with The Love Boat intro sequence being parodied.

The cruise ship Regal Princess of Princess Cruises played the song in the horn. A later commercial from the cruise line features Ted Lasso actress Hannah Waddingham performing the song on its new Sun Princess.
