= Mickey Mantle =

American baseball player (1931–1995)

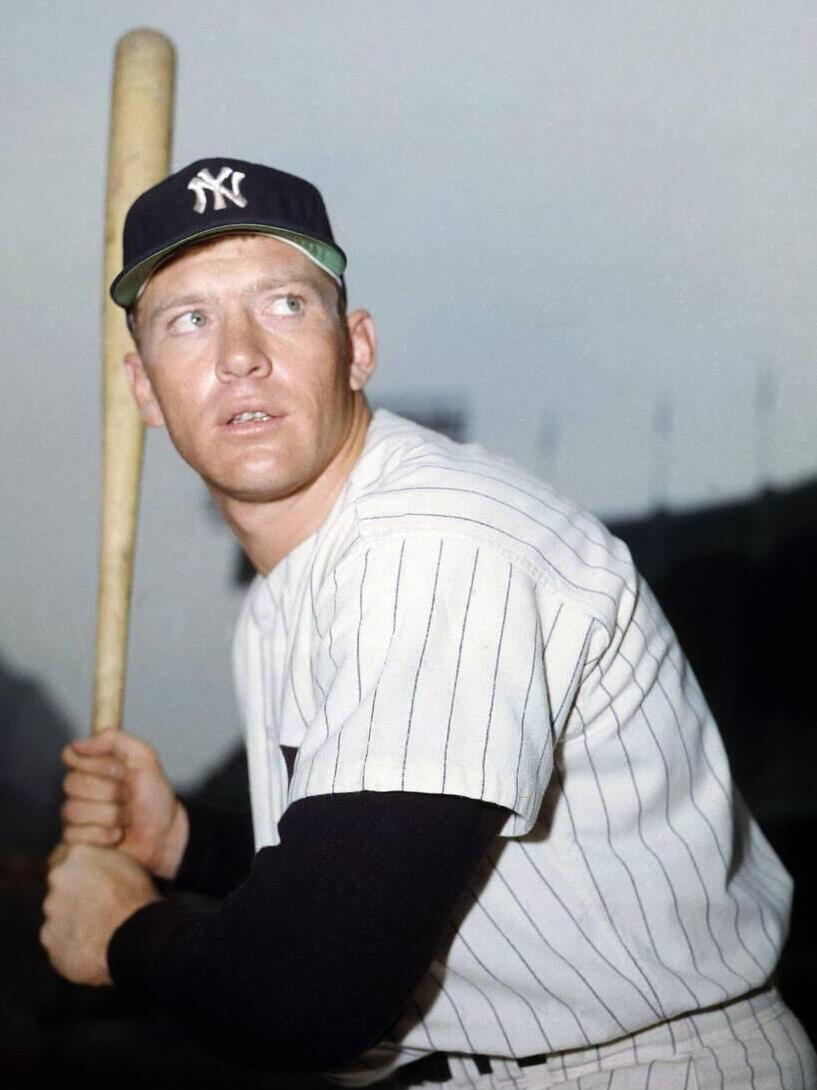
- Mantle in 1957
- Center fielder
- Born: October 20, 1931; Spavinaw, Oklahoma, U.S.
- Died: August 13, 1995 (aged 63); Dallas, Texas, U.S.
- Batted: Switch Threw: Right

MLB debut
- April 17, 1951, for the New York Yankees

Last MLB appearance
- September 28, 1968, for the New York Yankees

MLB statistics
- Batting average: .298
- Hits: 2,415
- Home runs: 536
- Runs batted in: 1,509
- Stats at Baseball Reference

Teams
- New York Yankees (1951–1968)

Career highlights and awards
- 20× All-Star (1952–1965, 1967, 1968); 7× World Series champion (1951–1953, 1956, 1958, 1961, 1962); 3× AL MVP (1956, 1957, 1962); Triple Crown (1956); Gold Glove Award (1962); AL batting champion (1956); 4× AL home run leader (1955, 1956, 1958, 1960); AL RBI leader (1956); New York Yankees No. 7 retired; Monument Park honoree; Major League Baseball All-Century Team

Member of the National

Baseball Hall of Fame
- Induction: 1974
- Vote: 88.2% (first ballot)

Mickey Charles Mantle (October 20, 1931 – August 13, 1995), nicknamed "the Mick" and "the Commerce Comet", was an American professional baseball player who played his entire Major League Baseball (MLB) career (1951–1968) with the New York Yankees, primarily as a center fielder. Mantle is regarded by many as one of the best players and sluggers of all time. He was an American League (AL) Most Valuable Player three times and was inducted into the Baseball Hall of Fame in 1974.

Born in Spavinaw, Oklahoma, Mantle was raised by his father to become a baseball player and was trained early on to become a switch hitter. Despite a career plagued with injuries, beginning with his knee injury in the 1951 World Series, he became one of the greatest offensive threats in baseball history, and was able to hit for both average and power. He is the only player to hit 150 home runs from each side of the plate. Mantle hit 536 career home runs while batting .300 or more ten times; he is 16th all-time in home runs per at-bat and 17th in on-base percentage.

Mantle won the Triple Crown in 1956, when he led the major leagues in batting average (.353), home runs (52), and runs batted in (RBI) (130). He was an All-Star for 16 seasons, playing in 16 of the 20 All-Star Games that he was selected for. He also had a solid .984 fielding percentage when playing center field, winning a Gold Glove in that position. He appeared in 12 World Series, winning seven championships, and holds World Series records for the most home runs (18), RBIs (40), extra-base hits (26), runs (42), walks (43), and total bases (123), and he has the highest World Series on-base and slugging percentages.

After retirement, Mantle worked as a sports commentator for NBC for a few years and had a brief stint as first base and hitting coach for the Yankees in the 1970 season. Despite being one of the best-paid athletes of his era, he was a poor businessman and suffered financial setbacks from business failures. His private life was plagued by tumult and tragedy. His marriage fell apart due to his alcoholism and infidelity, and three of his sons became alcoholics, one of them dying from it. Towards the end of his life, Mantle came to regret his hard lifestyle and the damage he had inflicted on his family. Before his final year, he was treated for alcoholism and became sober, afterwards warning others of the dangers of hard drinking. He died in Dallas, Texas, aged 63, from liver cancer brought on by years of alcohol abuse.

== Early years ==
Mantle was born on October 20, 1931, in Spavinaw, Oklahoma, the son of Lovell Thelma (née Richardson; previously Davis) (1904–1995) and Elvin Charles "Mutt" Mantle (1912–1952). He was of at least partial English ancestry; his great-grandfather George Mantle left Brierley Hill, a small town in England's Black Country, and immigrated to the United States in 1848.

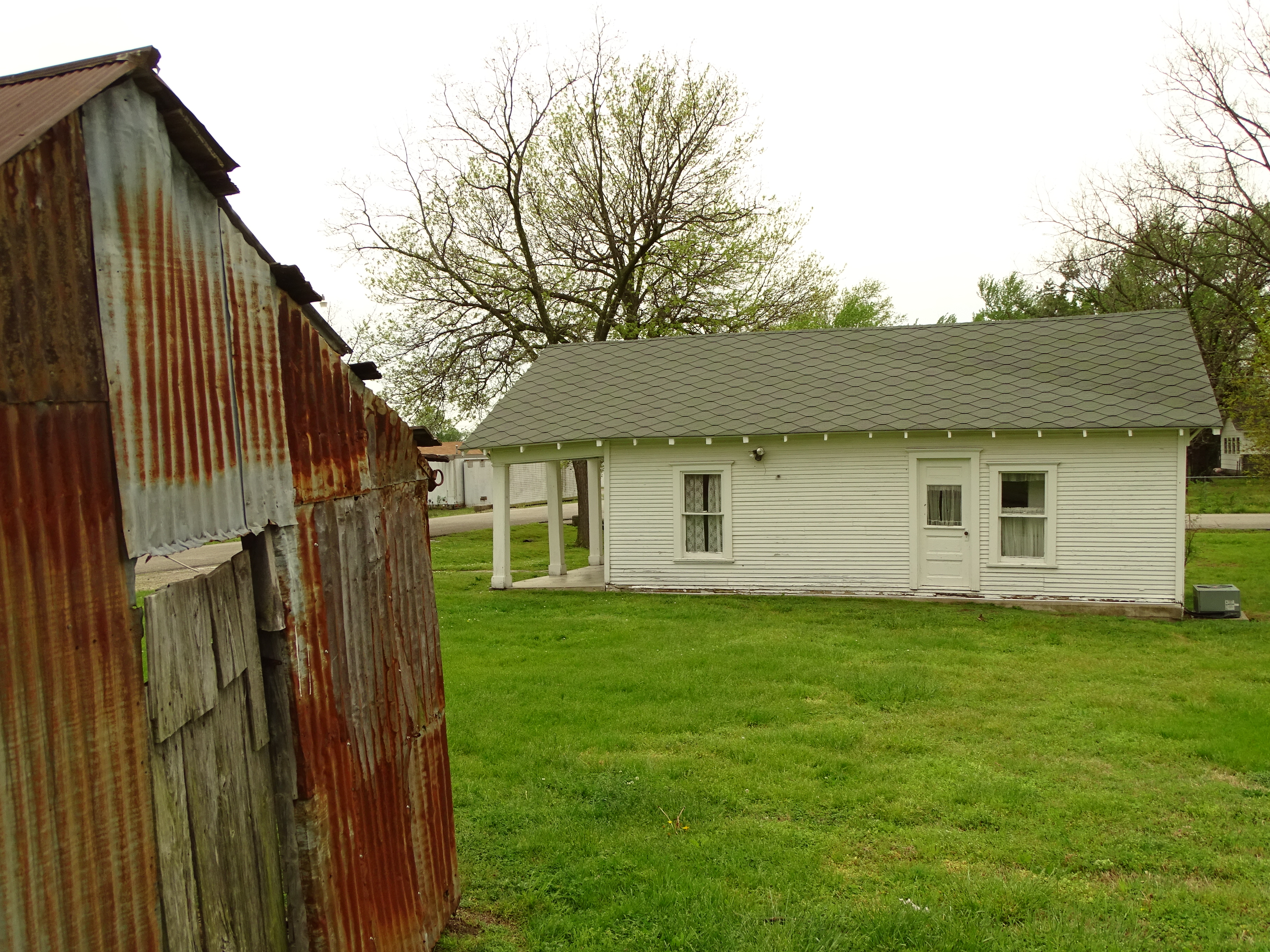
Mantle's boyhood home in Commerce, Oklahoma

Mantle had two older half-siblings, Ted and Anna Bae Davis, from his mother's first marriage, and four younger full siblings: twin brothers Ray and Roy, brother Larry, and sister Barbara. When he was four years old, Mantle's family moved to the nearby town of Commerce, Oklahoma, where his father worked in lead and zinc mines.

A semi-pro player himself, Mutt Mantle decided that his eldest son would be a baseball player before Mantle was even born. He named his eldest son after Hall of Fame catcher Mickey Cochrane and, very early on, began training Mickey to become a switch-hitter: Mantle later recalled batting left-handed against his father, who pitched to him right-handed, and batting right-handed against his grandfather, Charles Mantle, who pitched to him left-handed.

In addition to baseball, Mantle was an all-around athlete at Commerce High School, playing basketball and football. He excelled in football, playing the halfback position. After graduating, Mantle was offered a football scholarship by the University of Oklahoma but declined it at his father's behest. However, in his sophomore year, he sustained an injury during a practice football game which nearly ended his athletic career. He was kicked in the left shin and developed osteomyelitis, an infectious disease incurable just a few years earlier, in his left leg. Mantle's parents drove him overnight to Oklahoma City, where he was treated at a children's hospital with the newly available penicillin. The treatment successfully reduced the infection and saved his leg from amputation.

Later in life, Mantle confided in friends and family about how he suffered from sexual abuse as a child at the hands of his older half-sister Anna Bae, who often babysat her younger half-siblings when Mantle's parents were out, as well as by other adults, including Anna Bae's friends and older boys in the neighborhood. His wife Merlyn recalled later on that Mantle also had a sexual relationship with one of his high school teachers when he was still a minor. According to Merlyn, the teacher "seduced" him: "She just laid over him."

The child sexual abuse he endured at the hands of family and adults likely contributed to Mantle's self-destructive behavior as an adult, with biographer Jane Leavy speculating that Mantle, like many childhood sexual abuse victims, likely suffered from complex post-traumatic stress disorder.

== Professional baseball ==
=== Minor leagues (1948–1950) ===
Mantle began his professional baseball career in Kansas with the semi-professional Baxter Springs Whiz Kids. In 1948, Yankees scout Tom Greenwade came to Baxter Springs to watch Mantle's teammate, third baseman Willard "Billy" Johnson. During the game, Mantle hit three home runs. Greenwade returned in 1949, after Mantle's high school graduation, to sign Mantle to a minor league contract with the Yankees at $140 per month (equivalent to $1,900 in 2025), with a $1,500 signing bonus (equivalent to $20,300 in 2025).

Mantle was assigned to the Yankees' Class-D Independence Yankees of the Kansas–Oklahoma–Missouri League, where he played shortstop and hit .313. He hit his first professional home run on June 30, 1949, at Shulthis Stadium in Independence, Kansas. The ball went over the center field fence, which was 460 feet from home plate. In 1950, Mantle was promoted to the Class-C Joplin Miners of the Western Association, where he won the Western Association batting title with a .383 average. He hit 26 home runs and recorded 136 RBIs, but struggled defensively at shortstop.

In July 1950, after the start of the Korean War, Mantle was drafted for military service. The draft board rejected him as physically unqualified for military service due to the osteomyelitic condition of his left leg and gave him a 4-F deferment, the first of three times he was rejected for military service.

=== Major leagues (1951–1968) ===
==== Rookie season: 1951 ====
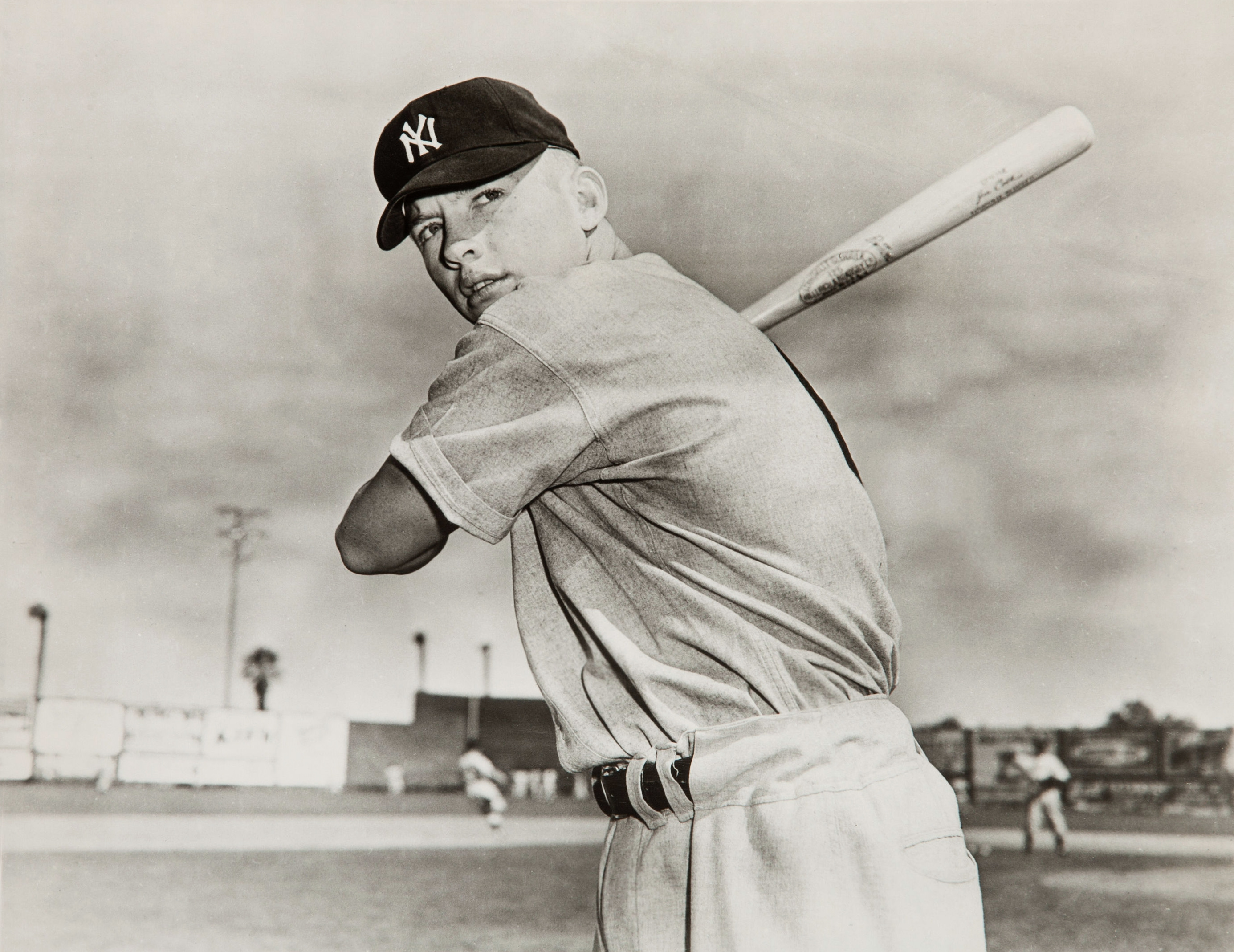
Mantle as a 19-year-old rookie in 1951

Mantle was invited to the Yankees instructional camp before the 1951 season and proceeded to make a big impression during spring training. One famous incident was when he hit two home runs at Bovard Field against the USC Trojans baseball team, when the Yankees were on a thirteen-game spring training tour of the west coast. Both home runs, one from each side of the plate, reportedly traveled a distance of at least 500 feet. Impressed by the 19-year-old's power, Yankees manager Casey Stengel decided to promote Mantle to the majors as a right fielder instead of sending him to the minors; his salary for the 1951 season was $7,500. Mantle was assigned uniform No. 6, signifying the expectation from the Yankees front office that he would become the next Yankees star, following Babe Ruth (No. 3), Lou Gehrig (No. 4), and Joe DiMaggio (No. 5).

After a brief slump, Mantle was sent down to the Yankees' top farm team, the Kansas City Blues. His struggles at the plate continued. Out of frustration, he called his father and told him: "I don't think I can play baseball anymore." Mutt Mantle drove up to Kansas City that day. When he arrived, he started packing his son's clothes and, according to Mantle, said: "I thought I raised a man. I see I raised a coward instead. You can come back to Oklahoma and work the mines with me." After his father's rebuke, Mantle gradually broke out of his slump and went on to hit .361 with 11 home runs and 50 RBIs during his stay in Kansas City.

Mantle was called up to the Yankees after 40 games with Kansas City, this time wearing uniform No. 7. He hit .267 with 13 home runs and 65 RBI in 96 games as the Yankees reached the World Series against the New York Giants. In the second game of the 1951 World Series, Giants rookie Willie Mays hit a fly ball to right-center field. Mantle, playing right field, raced for the ball together with center fielder DiMaggio. At the last moment, the latter called for the ball. In attempting to stay out of DiMaggio's way, Mantle's spikes got caught over an exposed drain pipe. His knee twisted awkwardly and he fell instantly, his right knee injured severely. Mantle had to be carried off the field on a stretcher. This was the first of numerous injuries that were to plague his eighteen-year career with the Yankees. He was to play the rest of his career with a torn anterior cruciate ligament (ACL).

Accompanying his son to the hospital after the game, Mantle's father collapsed onto the sidewalk while trying to help his son into a taxi. The two were given hospital beds in the same room and watched the remainder of the World Series together. Mutt Mantle was diagnosed with Hodgkin's disease; he died a few months later at the age of 40, on May 7, 1952. Mantle, at the time away with the Yankees, was informed by manager Stengel of his father's death and was inconsolable.

==== Rise to stardom: 1952–1960 ====
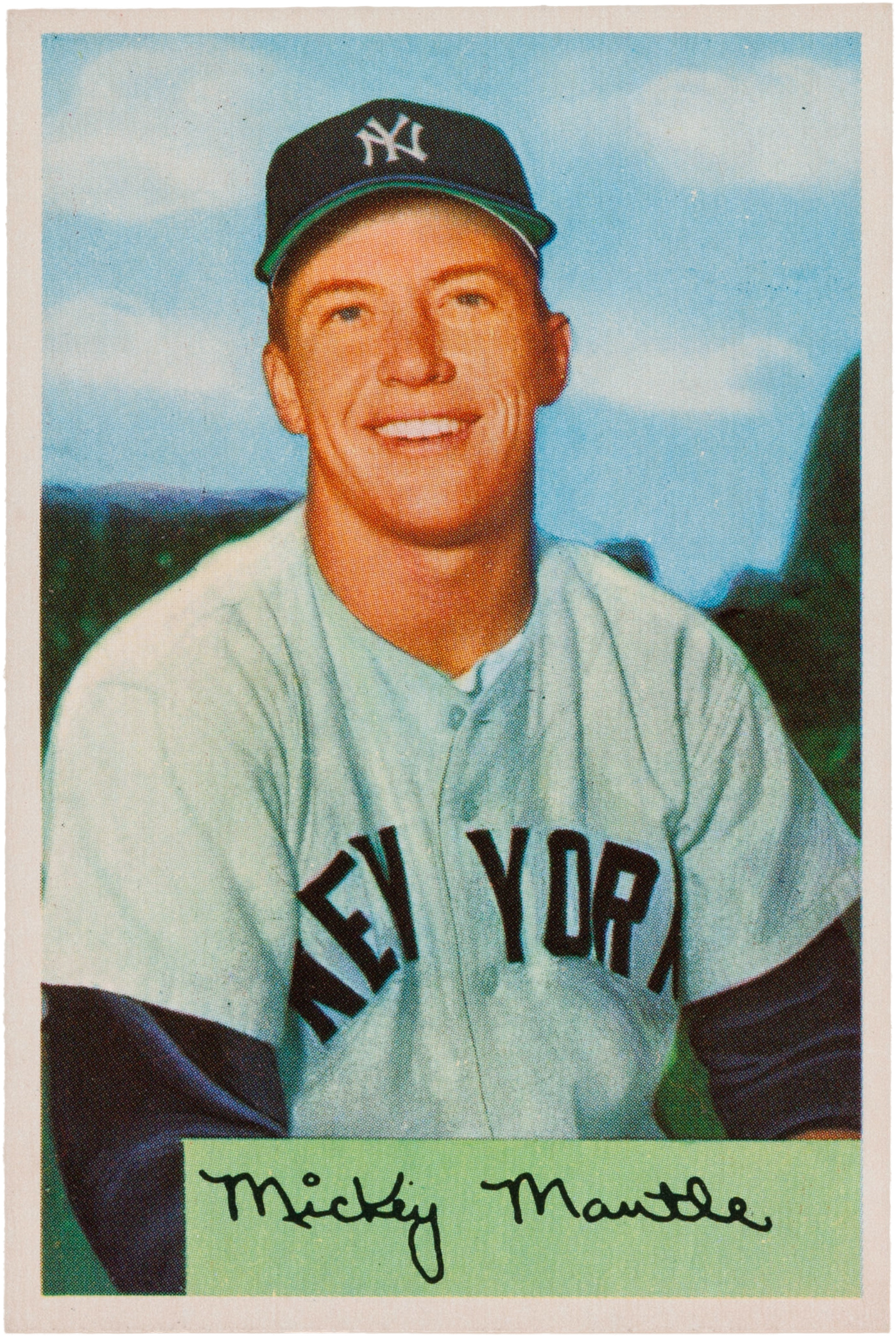
Bowman's Mantle trading card, 1954

Following the 1951 World Series, DiMaggio retired from baseball. As a result, Mantle moved to center field before the start of the 1952 season. He played that position full-time for the Yankees until 1965, when he was moved to left field near the end of his career. That year, Mantle was selected as an All-Star for the first time but did not make an appearance in the rain-shortened All-Star Game. The Yankees won the pennant and faced the Brooklyn Dodgers in the World Series. Mantle performed well in the series, recording an on-base percentage above .400 and a slugging percentage above .600. In Game 6, he homered in a 3–2 win. In Game 7, he knocked in the winning runs in the 4–2 victory, with a home run in the sixth inning and an RBI single in the seventh.

Mantle's emergence as a star center fielder coincided with the Korean War. Due to his previous rejection, he was not amongst the baseball players who joined the Armed Forces, leading baseball fans and sportswriters to question his 4-F deferment. This led to newspapers even calling him a "draft dodger" and Mantle receiving threatening letters. In April 1951, Mantle was re-examined by the draft board and was once again rejected as being physically unfit for military service. A second highly publicized physical, brought on by his All-Star selection, was held in October 1952 and ended in a final rejection, this time due to the knee injury sustained in the 1951 World Series.

Mantle had a strong 1953 season, making the All-Star Game and helping the Yankees to another World Series, which they won against the Brooklyn Dodgers. He missed several weeks due to his previously injured knee which had been left untreated after the initial stay in hospital in 1951. After the season ended, a full two years after the injury he had picked up at the 1951 series, Mantle had surgery performed on his left knee in November 1953. The following season, Mantle recorded his first 100-RBI season while also hitting over .300 and leading the league in runs scored. He had a strong season in 1955 as well, leading the AL in home runs, triples, and walks, and recording a .306 batting average.

The 1956 season was, statistically, Mantle's greatest and was later described by him as his "favorite summer." He led the majors with .353 batting average, 52 home runs, and 130 RBIs, winning the Triple Crown, the only switch hitter to do so. This was the first of three AL MVP Awards. He also hit his second All-Star Game home run that season. That year, the Yankees again faced the Brooklyn Dodgers in the World Series. In the fifth inning of Game 5, Mantle kept Don Larsen's perfect game alive by making a running catch of a deep fly ball off the bat of Gil Hodges. The inning before, he had scored the first of the Yankees' two runs with a home run off Brooklyn starter Sal Maglie. Mantle's overall performance in 1956 led to his being named Associated Press Male Athlete of the Year, and he was also awarded the Hickok Belt as the top American professional athlete of the year.

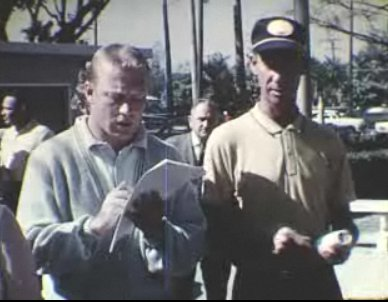
Mantle signing an autograph in the early 1960s

Mantle won his second consecutive MVP in 1957, leading the leagues in runs scored and walks and recording a career-high batting average of .365, second best in the AL. That season, Mantle reached base more times than he made outs (319 to 312), one of two seasons in which he achieved the feat. In the 1957 World Series, the Yankees faced the Milwaukee Braves. During Game 5, Mantle suffered a torn tendon in his left shoulder from a collision with Braves second baseman Red Schoendienst. The Braves won the series in seven games and the injury would lead to Mantle having struggles in his uppercut swing from the left side for the remainder of his career.

Still recovering from his shoulder injury, Mantle's 1958 season started slowly; during the first half, he was hitting a modest .274. He eventually regained his form, hitting .330 in the second half of the season, finishing with .304 batting average and leading the league in home runs, runs scored, and walks. He led the Yankees back to a World Series rematch against the Braves, this time coming out victorious. Despite his strong season, the Yankees declined Mantle's request for a contract raise to $85,000, citing that his batting average was almost 61 points lower than the year before. After briefly holding out, Mantle eventually settled for their lower offer of $70,000.

In the 1959 season, as the Yankees finished third in the AL rankings, Mantle's overall numbers declined from the previous season. He recorded only 75 RBIs and also racked up a league-leading 126 strikeouts. Though he led the team in base stealing (23), runs scored (104), on-base percentage (.390), and fielding percentage (.995), Mantle agreed to take a salary cut of $10,000 at the end of the season. The 1959 season was also the first of four consecutive seasons when two All-Star games were played, with Mantle playing in seven of these games. (Note: Major League Baseball held two All-Star Games for the years 1959–1962.) Mantle made the All-Star team as a reserve player in 1959. In the first game, he was used as a pinch runner and as replacement right fielder. In the second game, Mantle was the starting center fielder, recording a single and a walk in four at-bats.

Mantle began the 1960 season slowly, with his batting average dropping as low as .228 in June. However, he regained his form and finished the season leading the AL in home runs and runs scored, as the Yankees won the pennant. That year, Mantle started in both All-Star games, getting two walks in the first and a single in the second. Although his batting average was the lowest since his rookie year, a league-leading 40 home runs and 94 RBIs saw him come a close second to teammate Roger Maris in the MVP race. In the 1960 World Series against the Pittsburgh Pirates, Mantle turned in his best performance in a single postseason. In seven games, he batted .400 (10-for-25) with 9 walks, hitting three home runs with 11 RBIs and recording an on-base percentage of .545. The Yankees lost the World Series in Game 7 on Bill Mazeroski's walk-off home run. Mantle was devastated by the loss, reportedly crying in the clubhouse afterwards. He would later call the loss in the 1960 World Series as one of the biggest disappointments of his career.

==== M&M Boys: 1961 home run chase ====
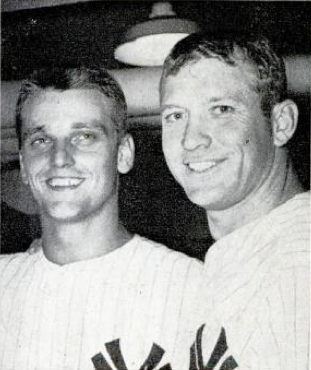
Roger Maris and Mantle during the historic 1961 season, when they both chased Babe Ruth's home run record

During the 1961 season, Mantle and teammate Roger Maris, known as the M&M Boys, pursued Babe Ruth's 1927 single-season record of 60 home runs. Five years earlier, Mantle had challenged Ruth's record for most of the season, and the New York press had been protective of Ruth on that occasion. When Mantle finally fell short, finishing with 52 home runs, many reporters were relieved. The New York press was harsh in its treatment of Mantle in his early years with the Yankees, emphasizing that he struck out frequently, was injury-prone, was a rube from Oklahoma, and was perceived as inferior to DiMaggio. Over time, however, Mantle had learned to deal with the New York media and had gained the favor of the press, receiving help from teammate Whitey Ford, a native of Queens. "I couldn't do anything wrong after Roger beat me," Mantle said. "I became the underdog; they hated him and liked me. Everywhere I went I got standing ovations. It was a lot better than having them boo you."

Unlike Mantle, Maris was new to the New York scene, having been traded to the Yankees from the Kansas City Athletics before the 1960 season, and never managed to adjust to demands of the New York press, many of whom began to view him as surly and rude. During the 1961 season, the press pushed the notion of the Yankees being Mantle's team, with Maris often belittled and ostracized as an outsider and not a "true Yankee".

Late in the season, Mantle was hospitalized with a severe abscessing septic infection on his hip, which had resulted from a "miracle shot" that he had received from physician Max Jacobson at the recommendation of Yankees broadcaster Mel Allen. (Note: Jacobson treated a number of famous Americans including President John F. Kennedy, Elvis Presley, and Marilyn Monroe.) It was discovered years later that Jacobson's so-called "miracle shot" was in fact laced with various substances, including amphetamines and methamphetamines, and resulted in at least one death. This revelation exposed Jacobson as a fraud and he was stripped of his medical license in 1975.

While Maris went on to break the record on the last day of the season, Mantle finished with 54 home runs, setting a single-season record for a switch-hitter that stood until September 2025. He also led the AL in runs scored and walks. For the second consecutive year, he narrowly missed winning his third MVP award, finishing second to repeat winner Maris. Under new manager Ralph Houk, the Yankees won the World Series that year against the Cincinnati Reds. Neither Mantle nor Maris performed well in the series, recording between them three hits and two RBIs in twenty-five at-bats over five games.

==== Final seasons: 1962–1968 ====
In 1962, Mantle batted .321 in 121 games and was selected as an All-Star for the eleventh consecutive season. He played in the first game but, due to the recurrence of an old injury, sat out the second. Despite missing 41 games, he was selected as MVP for the third time, beating out teammate Bobby Richardson in the voting. With a .978 fielding percentage that season, he also received his only Gold Glove Award. In the 1962 World Series, the Yankees beat the San Francisco Giants in seven games. Mantle fared poorly in the series, hitting .120 with five strikeouts. After the 1962 season, the Yankees gave Mantle a contract of $100,000, making him the fifth player to reach that pinnacle, after Hank Greenberg, Joe DiMaggio, Ted Williams, and Stan Musial. Only Willie Mays, with a salary of $105,000, made more than Mantle in 1963. Having reached the $100,000 salary threshold, Mantle never asked for another raise.

On May 22, 1963, Mantle hit a long drive off the top of the right field facade at Yankee Stadium, the closest that anyone came to hitting a home run out of the old stadium. However, on June 5, he broke his foot while trying to prevent a home run by Brooks Robinson in Baltimore; his spikes had been caught in the center field chain-link fence as he came down after leaping against it. As a result, he did not play again until August 4, when he hit a pinch-hit home run against the Baltimore Orioles at Yankee Stadium. Mantle returned to the center field position on September 2 and finished the season batting .314 in 65 games. He was selected as an All-Star but, due to the foot injury, did not make the AL 25-man roster for the first time.

That year, the Yankees made the World Series and were favorites to win over the Los Angeles Dodgers. They were swept in four games for the first time in franchise history. In Game 1, Mantle struck out twice against Cy Young Award winner and National League MVP Sandy Koufax, who finished with a record-setting 15 strikeouts in a World Series game. In Game 4, he hit a home run off Koufax to tie Babe Ruth's record of 15 in the World Series. With the tying run on base in the ninth inning, he struck out against Koufax for the third time. He finished the series 1-for-15 with five strikeouts.

In 1964, Mantle hit .303 with 35 home runs and 111 RBIs, and played center field in the All-Star game. He finished in second place in the MVP voting. The Yankees faced the St. Louis Cardinals in the 1964 World Series. In the bottom of the ninth inning of Game 3, Mantle hit a walk-off home run into the right field stands at Yankee Stadium to win the game for his team by a score of 2–1. This was his 16th home run in the World Series, breaking Ruth's record of 15. He hit two more home runs in the series to set a new record of 18, including an opposite field shot off Cardinals star Bob Gibson in St. Louis, and hit .333 with 8 RBIs overall. Despite Mantle's performance, the Cardinals won the World Series in seven games behind Gibson's overall excellent pitching.

On April 9, 1965, the Houston Astros and the Yankees played an exhibition game to inaugurate the Astrodome, the world's first multi-purpose, domed sports stadium. In the sixth inning Mantle hit the park's first home run. By 1965, he and the aging Yankees were slowed by injuries, finishing sixth in the AL rankings. Mantle hit .255 with 19 home runs and 46 RBI in 361 plate appearances. He was again selected as an All-Star, this time as a reserve player, and did not make an appearance in the game.

In 1966, Mantle's batting average increased to .288 with 23 home runs and 56 RBI in 333 at-bats. This improvement was largely due to strong performances in June and July, when he returned to his normal form until sidelined with another injury. After the 1966 season, he was replaced by Joe Pepitone in the outfield, and spent his final two seasons at first base. On May 14, 1967, Mantle became the sixth member of the 500 home run club.

Mantle hit .237 with 18 home runs and 54 RBIs during his final season in 1968. As a result, his lifetime average was to dip below .300, which caused him a lot of anguish. That year, despite his lowly numbers, Mantle was selected as an All-Star and made an appearance as a pinch-hitter at the All-Star Game at the Astrodome.

==== Retirement ====
Mantle announced his retirement at the age of 37 on March 1, 1969. He delivered a farewell speech on Mickey Mantle Day, June 8, 1969, at Yankee Stadium. Mantle's wife, mother, and mother-in-law were in attendance and received recognition at the ceremony held in his honor. When he retired, Mantle was third on the all-time home-run list with 536, and he was the Yankees' all-time leader in games played with 2,401, a record that would be broken by Derek Jeter on August 29, 2011.

=== Career statistics ===
In his career, Mantle batted .298 with an on-base percentage of .421 and an on-base plus slugging percentage of .977. "Falling under .300 was the biggest disappointment of my career," Mantle said. He accumulated 2,415 hits, including 536 home runs, 344 doubles, and 72 triples. While Mantle led the league in strikeouts five times, holding the all-time record at the time of his retirement, he was also adept at drawing walks. He led the majors in walks five times and finished with at least 100 walks in a season ten times. As an outfielder, he recorded a career fielding percentage of .982.

Mantle was selected as an All-Star every season during his 18-year career except for 1951 and 1966. He was a seven-time World Series champion with the Yankees, playing in twelve overall. In the World Series, he hit .257 over 65 games and holds the all-time World Series records for home runs (18), runs scored (42), and RBIs (40).

Category	G	BA	AB	R	H	2B	3B	HR	RBI	SB	CS	BB	SO	OBP	SLG	OPS	PO	A	DP	E	FLD%	Ref.
Total	2,401	.298	8,102	1,676	2,415	344	72	536	1,509	153	38	1,733	1,710	.421	.557	.977	6,734	290	201	107	.985	

== Player profile ==
=== Hitting ===
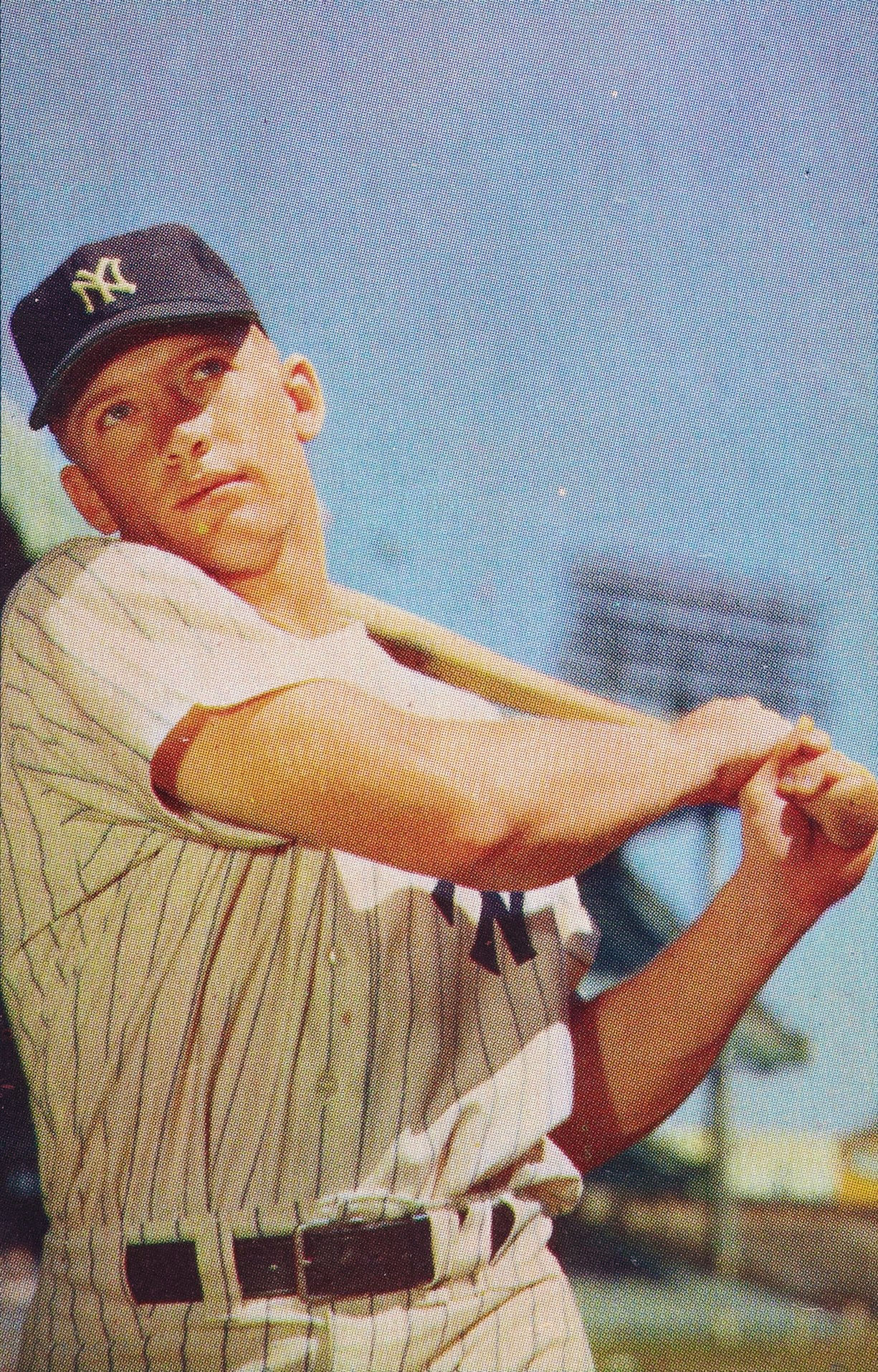
Mantle (c. 1953) became known for his power-hitting prowess very early in his career

Mantle is considered to be one of the greatest switch hitters in baseball history, hitting both for average and for power from both sides of the plate. In particular, he was known for his power, hitting some of the longest home runs in Major League history. On September 10, 1960, he hit a ball left-handed that cleared the right-field roof at Tiger Stadium in Detroit. Based on where the ball was found, it was estimated years later by historian Mark Gallagher to have traveled 643 feet (196 m).

Another Mantle home run, hit right-handed off Chuck Stobbs at Griffith Stadium in Washington, D.C., on April 17, 1953, was measured by Yankees traveling secretary Red Patterson (hence the term tape-measure home run) to have traveled 565 feet (172 m). Deducting for bounces, there is no doubt that each of the above home runs landed well over 500 feet (152 m) from home plate.

Twice in his career Mantle hit a home run off the third-deck facade at Yankee Stadium, nearly becoming the only player to hit a fair ball out of the stadium during a game. On May 22, 1963, against Kansas City's Bill Fischer, Mantle hit a home run against the 110-foot (34 m) high facade, before the ball caromed back onto the playing field. It was later estimated that the ball could have traveled 504 feet (154 m) had it not been blocked by the ornate and distinctive facade. On August 12, 1964, he hit one whose distance was undoubted: a center-field drive that cleared the 22-foot (6.7 m) batter's eye screen, some 75 feet beyond the 461-foot (141 m) marker at Yankee Stadium.

Although Mantle was a feared power hitter from either side of the plate and hit more home runs batting left-handed than right, he was a better hitter overall right-handed: roughly 25% of his total at-bats were from the right side, producing a batting average of .330 as opposed to .281 when batting from the left side. His 372 (left) to 164 (right) home run disparity was due to Mantle having batted left-handed much more often, as a large majority of pitchers are right-handed. In spite of short foul pole dimensions of 296 feet (90 m) to left and 301 feet (92 m) to right in the original Yankee Stadium, Mantle gained no advantage there as his stroke both left and right-handed drove balls to power alleys of 344–407 feet (right center) and 402–457 feet (left center) from the plate. Overall, he hit slightly more home runs away (270) than home (266).

Despite being known for power hitting, Mantle was also regarded as one of the best bunters for base hits. He is in 10th place in number of bases-empty bunt singles, with 80 in only 148 at-bats. He was also known for his remarkable ability to avoid grounding into double plays: for every 100 at-bats, Mantle grounded into 1.40 double plays, one of the lowest marks in history. In both 1953 and 1961, he hit into only two double plays over the course of 1,186 plate appearances.

=== Fielding ===
Though not a flashy fielder, Mantle was an overall solid center fielder, especially considering he did not play the position until after he had reached the Major Leagues. Manager Casey Stengel, unimpressed with him at shortstop, moved him to the outfield before his rookie year. Over time, Mantle developed one of the strongest outfield arms to compensate for weak points in his fielding. His outfield throws discouraged runners from taking an extra base. Possessed of good range in center field, his defensive skill was considered 'the less spectacular equal of his offensive genius'. Although he considered himself a better hitter than fielder, Mantle felt his running catch during Don Larsen's perfect game was the best play of his career. He later referred to it as "probably the only good catch I ever made. I wasn't that good of a fielder."

=== Injuries ===
Mantle's career was plagued with injuries. Beginning in high school, he suffered both acute and chronic injuries to bones and cartilage in his legs. By the end of his career simply swinging a bat caused him to fall to one knee in pain. Baseball scholars often ponder "what if" had Mantle not been injured but able to enjoy a healthy career.

In particular, the torn cartilage Mantle sustained to his right knee during the 1951 World Series was a very serious injury. Witnesses say it looked "like he had been shot." Dr. Stephen Haas, former medical director for the National Football League Players Association, has speculated that Mantle injured his ACL during that incident and played the rest of his career without having it properly treated, since an ACL could not be repaired with the surgical techniques available in that era. Surgery performed in 1953 removed torn cartilage to prevent further erosion to the joint but also left his knee unstable. In order to minimize the effect of that, Yankee trainers would later wrap up his knees tightly with athletic tape. After the injury, teammates noted a change in Mantle's gait and a loss of speed as a result. Despite his bad knee, Mantle was still known as the "fastest man to first base", once reportedly being recorded reaching first base in 3.1 seconds. (Note: This reading is almost certainly inaccurate and impossible to achieve, with statistician Tom Tango noting that sprinter Usain Bolt took roughly 3.5 seconds to get to distance between home and first during his record-setting performance in the 100 metres dash at the 2009 World Athletics Championships. It is speculated that the stopwatch used to time Mantle wasn't started till he was already two or three steps down the line. However, it does give a sense of Mantle's natural speed.) However, he was forbidden by Yankee managers from base stealing over the worry that his "delicate" knees would break down faster.

Further, the shoulder injury Mantle suffered during the 1957 World Series, while not affecting his numbers, led to increasing difficulty in hitting from the left side over the next decade.

== Later years ==
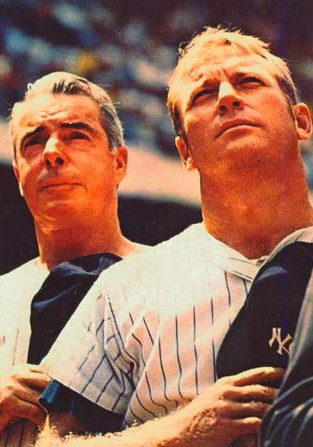
Joe DiMaggio and Mantle at an Old Timers' Day in Yankee Stadium, 1970

After retiring from baseball, Mantle briefly served as a part-time color commentator for NBC on Game of the Week. In 1969, he was the color commentator for the All-Star Game. He also served as a pre-game analyst for the 1969 and 1970 World Series. He was one of four color commentators used by the Expos during the 1972 season.

During the 1970 season, Mantle briefly returned to the Yankees as their first base and hitting coach for a few weeks. He quickly came to dislike the job and left the post at the end of the season. It was his last official appearance in a Major League uniform.

In 1973, at the Old-Timers Game at Yankee Stadium, Mantle, batting right-handed, faced his old teammate Whitey Ford. He hit a long home run over the 402-foot sign by the bullpen, his last at Yankee Stadium.

Although he was among the best-paid players of the pre-free-agency era, Mantle was a poor businessman and did not invest well and struggled financially for a while. Amongst his failed business ventures was his chain of Mickey Mantle's Country Cookin' restaurants in the early 1970s.

His financial situation improved after the sports memorabilia industry boomed in the 1980s. Mantle was a prized guest at baseball-card shows, and was paid considerable sums for his appearances and autographs. At the same time, he always insisted that the promoters of baseball-card shows include one of the lesser-known Yankees of his era, such as Bill Skowron or Hank Bauer, so that they could also earn money for their appearances.

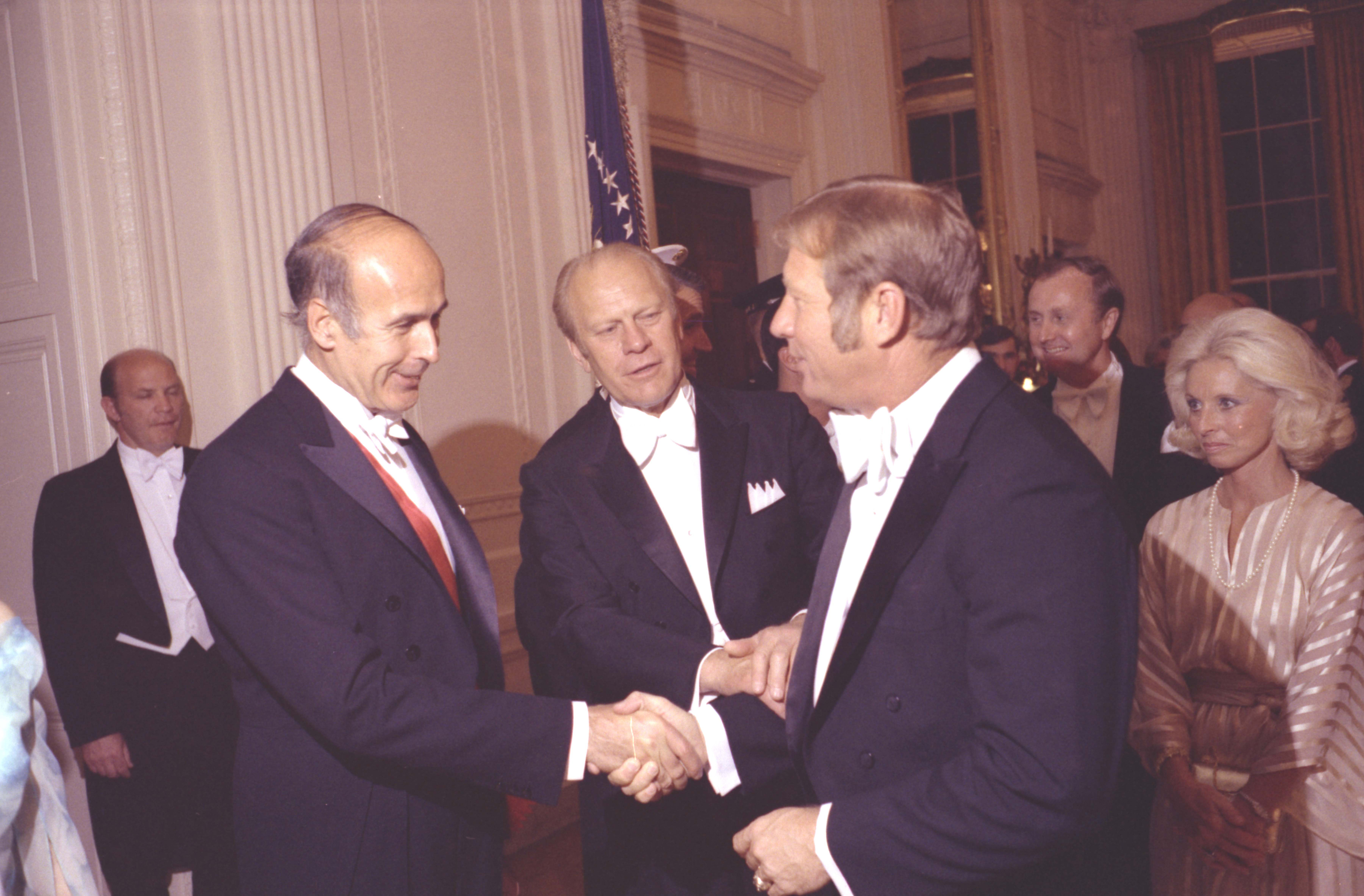
Mantle with French President Valéry Giscard d'Estaing and American President Gerald R. Ford, at the White House in 1976

In 1976, the Mantles were amongst the honorary guests invited to the White House when French President Valéry Giscard d'Estaing came on a state visit to celebrate the American Bicentennial.

In 1983, Mantle accepted a position at the Claridge Resort and Casino in Atlantic City, New Jersey, as a greeter and community representative. His job mostly involved representing the Claridge in golf tournaments and at other charity events. As a result, however, he was suspended from baseball by Commissioner Bowie Kuhn, who had taken a strong stance against gambling and viewed it as grounds for placement on the "permanently ineligible" list. Kuhn had already suspended Willie Mays, who had taken a position similar to Mantle's at Claridge. The commissioner warned Mantle before he accepted the position that he would be placed on the list if he took the job. Despite the warning, he accepted the position because he felt the rule was "stupid." He and Mays were both reinstated on March 18, 1985, by Kuhn's successor Peter Ueberroth.

In 1988, Mantle opened Mickey Mantle's Restaurant & Sports Bar in New York City, which proved to be a success. His original Yankee Stadium Monument Park plaque was displayed at the front entrance. While he made frequent appearances, he let others run the business.

After the Oklahoma City bombing on April 19, 1995, Mantle joined with fellow Oklahoman and Yankee Bobby Murcer to raise money for the victims.

== Personal life ==
On December 23, 1951, Mantle married Merlyn Johnson (1932–2009) in Picher, Oklahoma. The couple had four sons together: Mickey Jr. (1953–2000), David (born 1955), Billy (1957–1994; named for Billy Martin, Mantle's Yankee teammate and best friend), and Danny (born 1960).

In his autobiography, Mantle said that he had married Merlyn not out of love but because he was told to by his father who was, at the time, terminally ill. While Mantle's drinking became public knowledge during his lifetime, the press kept quiet about his marital infidelity and philandering. He was indiscreet about them: at his retirement ceremony in 1969, he brought his mistress along with his wife. In 1980, Mantle separated from his wife, and while the two lived apart for the rest of Mantle's life, they never filed for divorce. During his final days, the two made peace and Merlyn was at his bedside when he died.

During the last decade of his life, Mantle lived with his agent and live-in aide Greer Johnson. After Mantle's death, his family pursued a federal lawsuit against Johnson to prohibit her from auctioning many of Mantle's personal items, including a lock of hair, a neck brace, and expired credit cards. A settlement was reached allowing for the sale of some of Mantle's belongings for approximately $500,000.

At that time, Mantle purchased a condominium on Lake Oconee near Greensboro, Georgia, which was near Johnson's home, and stayed there for months at a time. He occasionally attended the local Methodist church, and sometimes ate Sunday dinner with members of the congregation. He was well liked by the citizens of Greensboro, who respected Mantle's privacy, refusing either to talk about him to outsiders or to direct fans to his home. In one interview, Mantle stated that the people of Greensboro had "gone out of their way to make me feel welcome, and I've found something there I haven't enjoyed since I was a kid."

Mantle was the uncle of actor, musician, and reality television personality Kelly Mantle.

=== Alcoholism ===
"If I'd known I was gonna live this long, I'd have taken a lot better care of myself."

— Mantle expressing regret about his self-destructive lifestyle later in life.

According to Mantle's childhood friend Nick Ferguson, Mantle's father often took them both out and bought beer for his son while Mantle was still underaged. Additionally, alcoholism ran in his mother's family and a number of Mantle's maternal relatives died from it.

Mantle's own trouble with alcohol was aggravated by his lifestyle. Before he sought treatment for alcoholism, he admitted that his hard living had hurt both his playing and his family. His rationale was that the men in his family had supposedly all died young, so he expected to die young as well; his father and uncle both died of Hodgkin's lymphoma while still in their forties and he presumed he would too. At the time, Mantle did not know that most of the men in his family had inhaled lead and zinc dust while working in the mines, which can cause Hodgkin's lymphoma.

Like Mantle, his wife and three of their sons also became alcoholics. Merlyn, Mickey Jr., and David all completed treatment for alcoholism and pleaded with Mantle to do the same. After being examined by a doctor, he was told that his liver was so badly damaged from almost 40 years of drinking that "your next drink could be your last." In response, Mantle checked into the Betty Ford Clinic on January 7, 1994. Also helping Mantle decide to enter the clinic was his friend the sportscaster Pat Summerall, by then a recovering alcoholic, who had recently been treated there.

Shortly after Mantle had completed treatment, his son Billy died in police custody on March 12, 1994, at age 36, after years of substance abuse. Despite the fears of those who knew him that this tragedy would send Mantle back to drinking, he remained sober for the remainder of his life. Later on, Mickey Jr. himself suffered from cancer, and died on December 20, 2000, at age 47.

In a 1994 Sports Illustrated cover story, Mantle spoke with remorse about his drinking. He said that he was telling the same old stories: realizing how many of them involved being drunk, including at least one drunk-driving crash, he decided they were not funny anymore. He admitted that he had often been cruel and hurtful to family, friends, and fans because of his alcoholism, and sought to make amends. Mantle became a born-again Christian when former teammate Bobby Richardson, a Baptist minister, shared his faith with him.

== Illness and death ==
Early in 1995, doctors discovered that Mantle's liver had been severely damaged by both alcohol-induced cirrhosis and hepatitis C, and that he had an inoperable liver cancer known as undifferentiated hepatocellular carcinoma, necessitating a liver transplant. He received the transplant at Baylor University Medical Center in Dallas on June 8, 1995. Mantle's popularity led to controversy over this transplant. Some felt that his fame had permitted him to receive a donor liver in just one day, bypassing patients who had been waiting much longer. His doctors insisted that the transplant was based solely on medical criteria, but acknowledged that the very short wait created the appearance of favoritism.

In July, Mantle had recovered enough to deliver a press conference at Baylor, and addressed fans that had looked to him as a role model: "This is a role model: Don't be like me." He also established the Mickey Mantle Foundation to raise awareness for organ donations. He returned to the hospital in late July, and the cancer was found to have spread throughout his body. Doctors observed that it was among the most aggressive cancers that they had ever treated, and felt that the immunosuppressive drugs administered to Mantle for his liver transplant had helped the cancer spread so quickly.

Mantle died at 2:10 a.m. on August 13, 1995, at Baylor University Medical Center with his wife Merlyn and son David at his side, five months after his mother had died at age 91. He was 63 years old. The Yankees played the Indians that day and honored him with a tribute. The team played the rest of the season with black mourning bands topped by a number 7 on their left sleeves.

Mantle's funeral was held in Lovers Lane United Methodist Church in Dallas, with around 1,500 people attending. Bobby Richardson led the funeral service while six other former teammates served as honorary pallbearers: Yogi Berra, Whitey Ford, Bill Skowron, Hank Bauer, Johnny Blanchard and Bobby Murcer.

Eddie Layton played "Somewhere Over the Rainbow" on the Hammond organ because Mickey had once told him that it was his favorite song. Roy Clark sang and played "Yesterday, When I Was Young". Bob Costas eulogized Mantle, describing him as "a fragile hero to whom we had an emotional attachment so strong and lasting that it defied logic". He continued:

In the last year of his life, Mickey Mantle, always so hard on himself, finally came to accept and appreciate the distinction between a role model and a hero. The first, he often was not. The second, he always will be. And, in the end, people got it.

At Mantle's request made prior to his death, Richardson read the same poem he recited at Roger Maris's funeral – "God's Hall of Fame" (written by a baseball fan). He later described it as one of the most difficult things he had ever done.

Mantle was interred in his family mausoleum, in the St. Matthew section of the Sparkman-Hillcrest Memorial Park Cemetery in Dallas. As per his wishes, the phrase "A Great Teammate" was carved on the plaque marking his resting place.

== Legacy ==
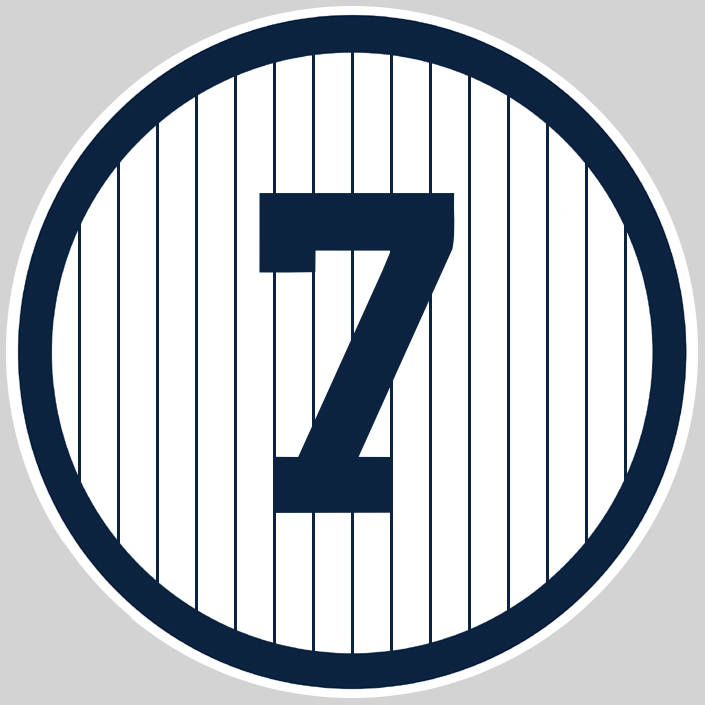
Mickey Mantle's number 7 was retired by the New York Yankees in 1969.

Mantle was inducted into the Oklahoma Hall of Fame in 1964. In 1969, he received the Golden Plate Award of the American Academy of Achievement.

On Mickey Mantle Day at Yankee Stadium, June 8, 1969, Mantle's number 7 was retired and he was presented with a bronze plaque to be hung on the center field wall near the monuments to Babe Ruth, Lou Gehrig, and Miller Huggins. The plaque was officially presented to Mantle by Joe DiMaggio. Mantle gave a similar plaque to DiMaggio, telling the crowd: "Joe DiMaggio's deserves to be higher." As per Mantle's request, DiMaggio's plaque was hung one inch higher than Mantle's. When Yankee Stadium was renovated and reopened in 1976, the plaques and monuments were moved to a newly created Monument Park behind the left-center field fence.

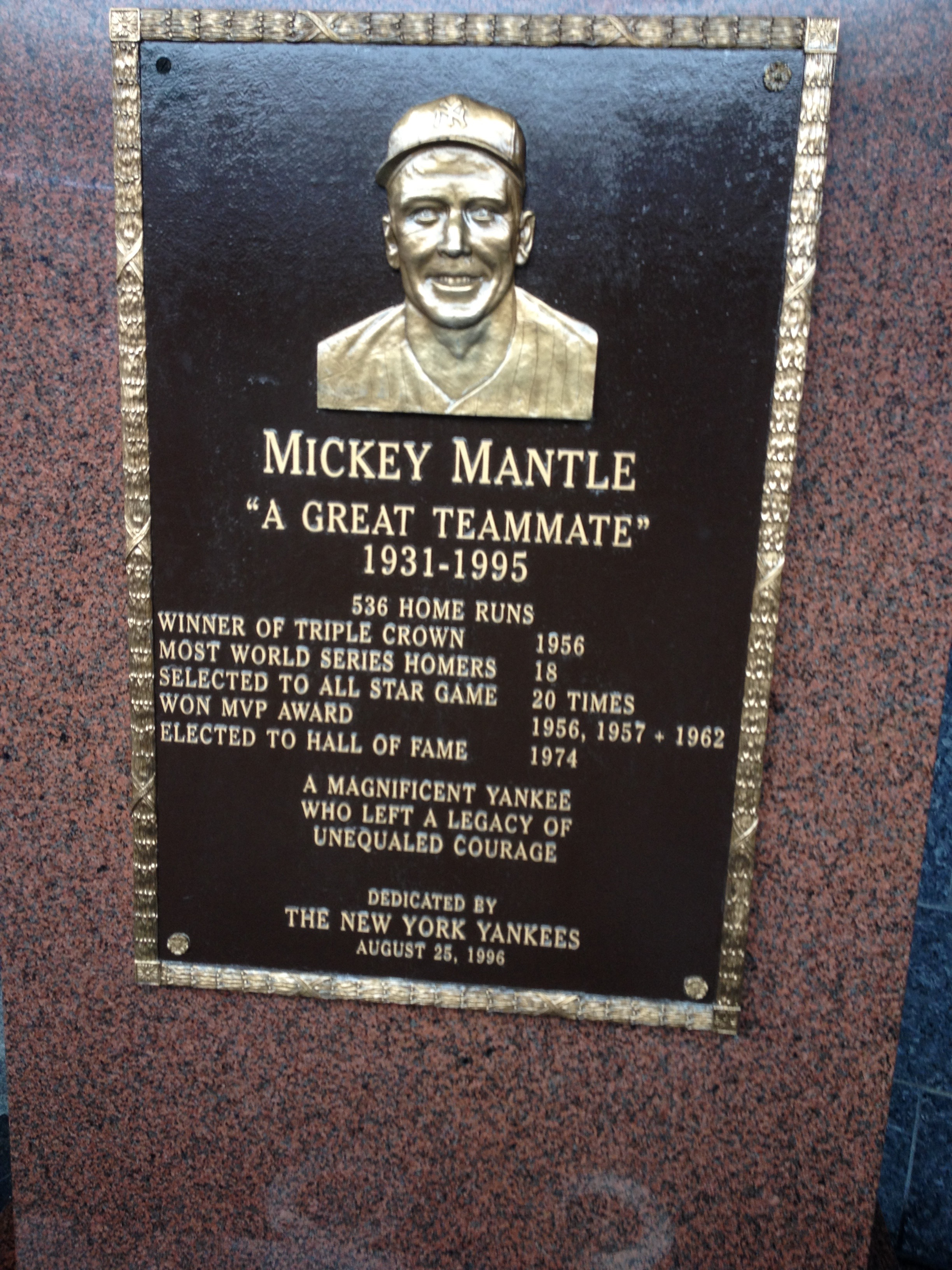
Mantle's plaque at Monument Park in the new Yankee Stadium

On August 25, 1996, Mantle's Monument Park plaque was replaced with a monument bearing the words "A great teammate" and keeping a phrase that had been included on the original plaque: "A magnificent Yankee who left a legacy of unequaled courage." Since the opening of the current Yankee Stadium in 2009, Mantle's monument has stood at the current Monument Park.

In 1974, his first year of eligibility, Mantle was elected to the Baseball Hall of Fame alongside his former teammate Whitey Ford.

In 1998, The Sporting News placed Mantle at 17th on its list of baseball's 100 greatest players. That same year, he was one of 30 players selected to the Major League Baseball All-Century Team. In 1999, ESPN's SportsCentury television program ranked Mantle at 37th on its list of Top 50 athletes of the 20th century. In 2020, The Athletic ranked Mantle at number 11 on its "Baseball 100" list, compiled by sportswriter Joe Posnanski.

In 2006, Mantle was featured on a United States postage stamp, one of a series of four including fellow baseball legends Mel Ott, Roy Campanella, and Hank Greenberg.

A statue of Mantle was unveiled in Oklahoma City in 1998 and is located at Mickey Mantle Plaza at Chickasaw Bricktown Ballpark, the home stadium of the Triple-A Oklahoma City Comets, 2 South Mickey Mantle Drive. In 2010, Mantle's hometown of Commerce, Oklahoma unveiled a statue called The Commerce Comet; it stands outside the centerfield fence of the baseball field at Commerce High School. In 2025, the Oklahoma City franchise were renamed to the Oklahoma City Comets in honor of Mantle.

A school for children with disabilities in Manhattan was renamed for Mantle on June 4, 2002. There is a Mickey Mantle Drive in San Antonio, Texas.

In August 2022, a 1952 Topps Mickey Mantle baseball card in mint condition (SGC Mint+ 9.5) sold for a record $12.6 million. It was originally purchased for $50,000 in 1991. The previous record for a sports card was $7.25 million, made by a 1909 T206 Honus Wagner card designed by the American Tobacco Company. At the time of the 2022 sale, the Mickey Mantle card was considered the most valuable card of the modern era. The Mickey Mantle baseball card was the first ever sports trading card sold at auction for eight figures.

In 2018, a game-worn Mantle jersey from the 1964 World Series sold at auction for a then-record $1.32 million. In 2023, a Game-Worn Mantle Jersey from the 1958 Season set a new record at auction selling for $4.68 Million.

=== Cultural portrayals ===
Mantle portrayed himself a number of times on screen. He appeared as himself in the 1958 film Damn Yankees in an uncredited role. He and Roger Maris starred as themselves in the 1962 film Safe at Home!, and also appeared, along with Yogi Berra, in a scene in the film That Touch of Mink (1962), sitting next to Doris Day and Cary Grant. Mantle appeared in Paul Simon's 1988 music video for "Me and Julio Down By the Schoolyard."

In 2001, Mantle was portrayed by Thomas Jane in 61*, directed by actor and comedian Billy Crystal. The film chronicled Mantle's and Maris's (played by Barry Pepper) 1961 chase of Ruth's single-season home-run record. Mantle's son Danny and grandson Will appeared briefly as a father and son watching Mantle hit a home run.

Mantle has been referenced in a number of songs. The most notable song is "I Love Mickey" by Teresa Brewer which came out in 1956; Mantle also took part in the recording, in a speaking role. Another well-known song is "Talkin' Baseball" by Terry Cashman, released in 1981; the song refers heavily to the three New York City center fielders of the 1950s: Willie Mays, Mantle, and Duke Snider.

== See also ==
- Major League Baseball titles leaders
- Major League Baseball Triple Crown
- List of Major League Baseball retired numbers
- List of Major League Baseball annual triples leaders
- List of Major League Baseball annual home run leaders
- List of Major League Baseball annual runs batted in leaders
- List of Major League Baseball annual runs scored leaders
- List of Major League Baseball batting champions
- List of Major League Baseball career home run leaders
- List of Major League Baseball career hits leaders
- List of Major League Baseball career runs scored leaders
- List of Major League Baseball career runs batted in leaders
- List of Major League Baseball career total bases leaders
- List of Major League Baseball career extra base hits leaders
- List of Major League Baseball career on-base percentage leaders
- List of Major League Baseball players to hit for the cycle
- List of Major League Baseball players who spent their entire career with one franchise

== Notes ==
Awards and achievements
Preceded by Ted Williams	American League Triple Crown Winner; 1956	Succeeded by Frank Robinson
Preceded by Lee Walls	Hitting for the cycle July 23, 1957	Succeeded by Frank Robinson
