= Commerce, Oklahoma =

- City
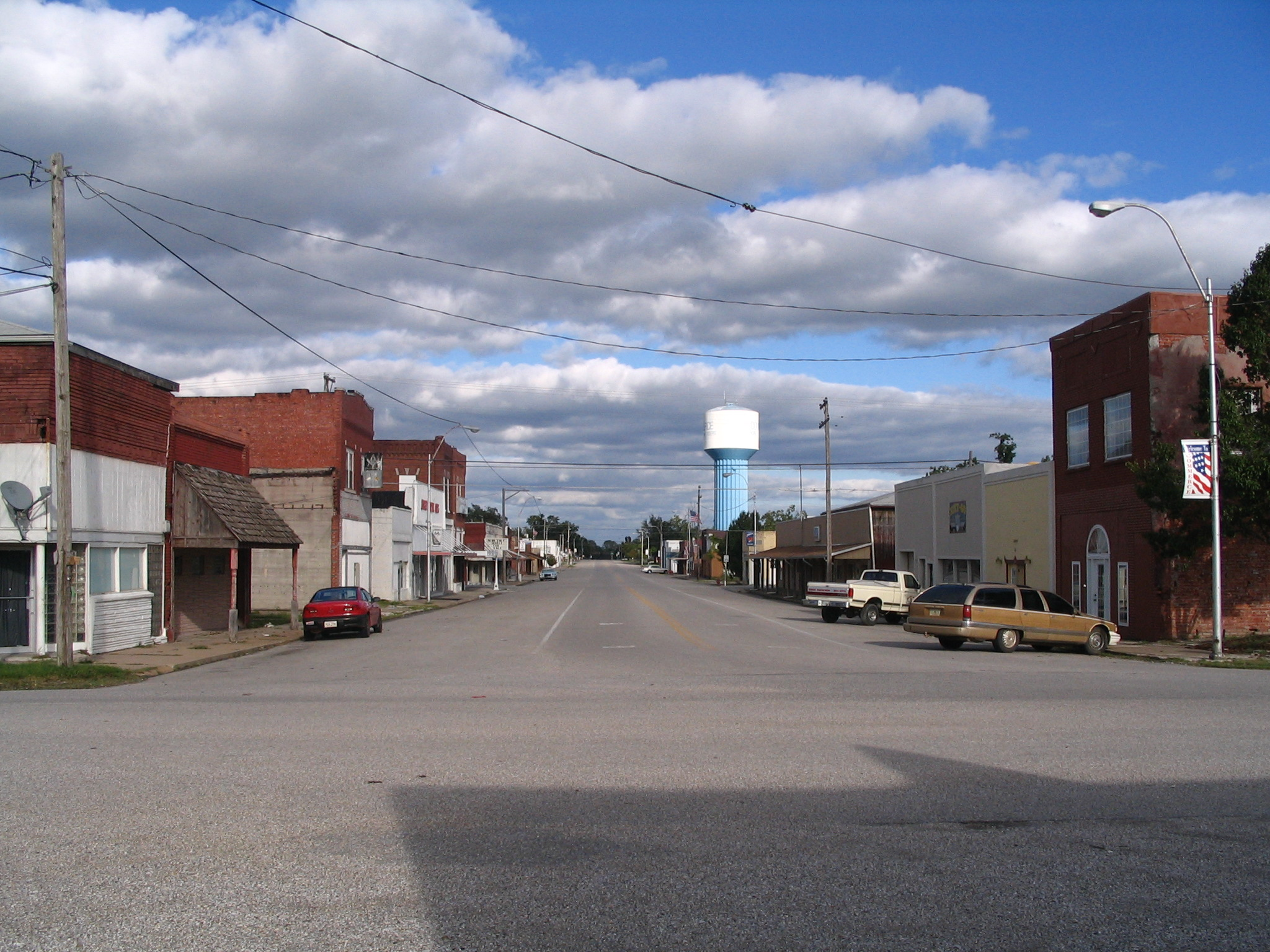
- Downtown Commerce, looking eastward down Main Street
- Motto: Home Of The Tigers
- Location within Ottawa County and the state of Oklahoma
- Coordinates: 36°56′01″N 94°52′17″W
- Country: United States
- State: Oklahoma
- County: Ottawa
- City: March 5, 1915
- Named for: Commerce Mining and Royalty Company

Government
  - Mayor: Keith Rush (V)
  - Council Members: Sharon Tompkins, Gary Howard, Sandra Ross, and Jake Martin

Area
  - Total: 2.31 sq mi (5.99 km^{2})
  - Land: 2.31 sq mi (5.99 km^{2})
  - Water: 0 sq mi (0.00 km^{2})
- Elevation: 791 ft (241 m)

Population (2020)
  - Total: 2,271
  - Density: 982.2/sq mi (379.23/km^{2})
- Time zone: UTC-6 (Central (CST))
  - Summer (DST): UTC-5 (CDT)
- ZIP code: 74339
- Area codes: 539/918
- FIPS code: 40-16500
- GNIS feature ID: 2410210
- Website: commerceokla.com

Commerce is a city in Ottawa County, Oklahoma, United States. As of the 2020 census, Commerce had a population of 2,271.

== History ==
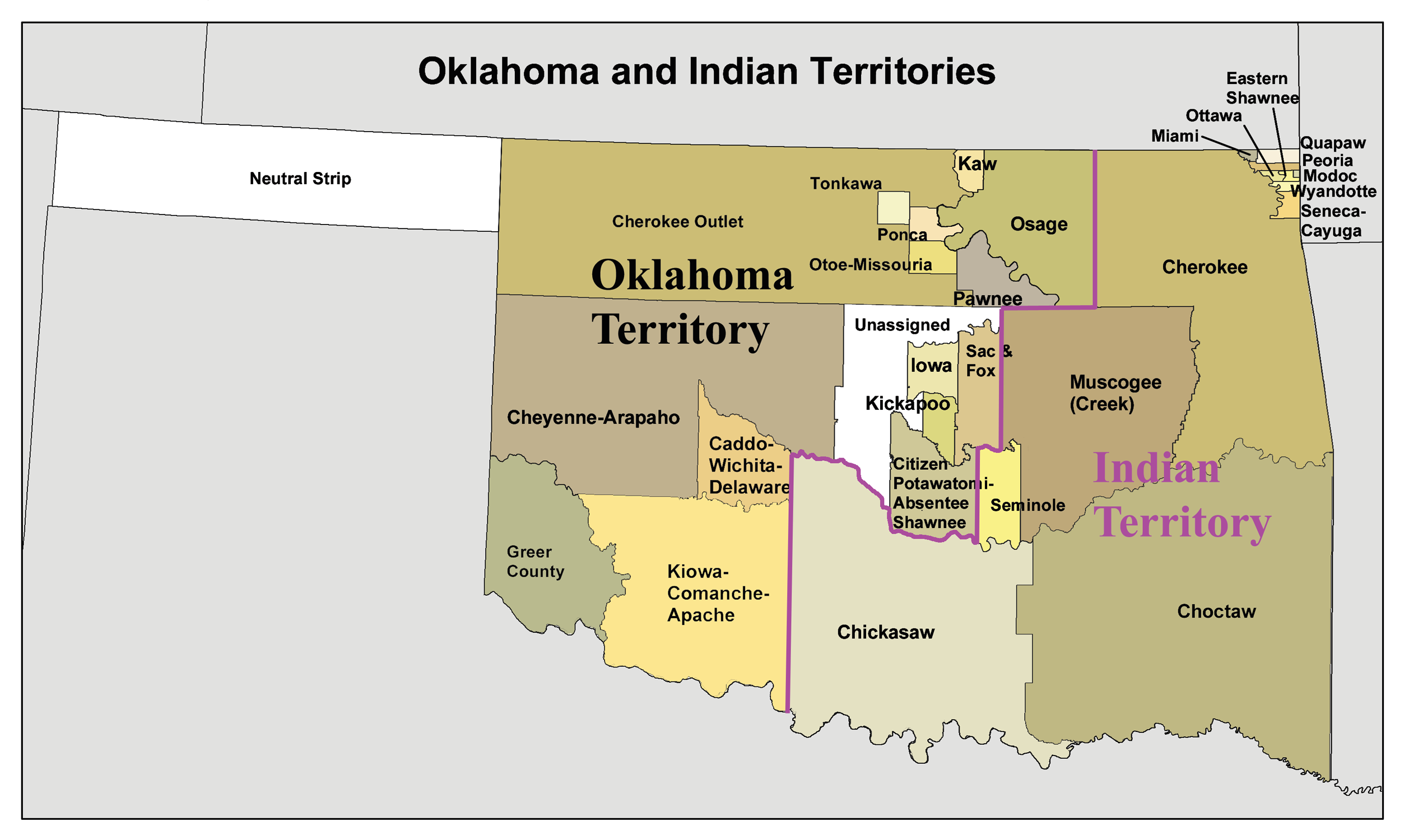

What became Commerce was land that was part of the Quapaw Indian Agency, allocated in the late 1830s. The Quapaw were removed to the area in the 1830s by the federal government after residing for hundreds of years on the west side of the Mississippi River in what later entered the union as the state of Arkansas.

Immigrants arrived and formed a mining camp named Hattonville after Amos Hatton. In 1906, Hatton developed the Emma Gordon zinc and lead mine, whose resources had attracted workers. Starting in 1908, the Oklahoma, Kansas and Missouri Inter-Urban Railway built a line between Miami and Commerce to serve the mining industry. In a series of steps the line was later acquired by the St. Louis–San Francisco Railway. In 1913, the residents called the local post office North Miami, though by June 1914 the post office took the present-day city's name that came from the Commerce Mining and Royalty Company, which had bought the mining camp.

In 1914, the mining company platted the town; a mayor–council government formed two years later. By the 1920 census, Commerce had a population of 2,555. The town's population has remained roughly the same size ever since.

Commerce was on Route 66 when that highway was commissioned in 1926, and was the first town on the route through Oklahoma after crossing the Kansas border westbound.

Commerce was the site of two notable events in the mid-1930s. In April 1934, Bonnie and Clyde and their associate Henry Methvin killed Commerce Constable William C. Campbell and kidnapped police chief Percy Boyd. By May, Bonnie and Clyde would both be dead. In 1935, in an event that would later become notable in retrospect, Mickey Mantle's father would move his family to Commerce, to work as a miner. Mantle would later be nicknamed "The Commerce Comet."

Most mines closed by 1960, due to a declining market and the realization of extensive environmental damage to ground, water and air. Residents have turned to occupations such as farming and ranching,

== Geography ==
Commerce is located at 36°56′1″N 94°52′17″W (36.933529, -94.871371), five miles (8.0 km) north of Miami on U.S. Route 69, which was once part of historic U.S. Route 66. According to the United States Census Bureau, the city has a total area of 0.8 square miles (2.1 km^{2}), all land.

== Demographics ==
Historical population
Census	Pop.	Note	%±
1920	2,555		—
1930	2,608		2.1%
1940	2,422		−7.1%
1950	2,422		0.0%
1960	2,378		−1.8%
1970	2,593		9.0%
1980	2,556		−1.4%
1990	2,426		−5.1%
2000	2,645		9.0%
2010	2,472		−6.5%
2020	2,271		−8.1%
U.S. Decennial Census

Commerce is included in the Joplin, Missouri metropolitan area.

=== 2020 census ===
As of the 2020 census, Commerce had a population of 2,271. The median age was 36.8 years; 27.9% of residents were under the age of 18 and 17.7% were 65 years of age or older. For every 100 females there were 94.9 males, and for every 100 females age 18 and over there were 86.7 males age 18 and over.

96.7% of residents lived in urban areas, while 3.3% lived in rural areas.

There were 846 households in Commerce, of which 34.6% had children under the age of 18 living in them. Of all households, 37.1% were married-couple households, 19.4% were households with a male householder and no spouse or partner present, and 34.5% were households with a female householder and no spouse or partner present. About 29.7% of all households were made up of individuals and 13.8% had someone living alone who was 65 years of age or older.

There were 1,009 housing units, of which 16.2% were vacant. Among occupied housing units, 67.5% were owner-occupied and 32.5% were renter-occupied. The homeowner vacancy rate was 1.7% and the rental vacancy rate was 11.9%.

Racial composition as of the 2020 census
Race	Percent
White	57.7%
Black or African American	0.5%
American Indian and Alaska Native	14.4%
Asian	0.2%
Native Hawaiian and Other Pacific Islander	<0.1%
Some other race	7.0%
Two or more races	20.1%
Hispanic or Latino (of any race)	24.5%

=== 2000 census ===
As of the 2000 census there were 2,645 people, 968 households, and 693 families residing in the city. The population density was 3,232.2 inhabitants per square mile (1,248.0/km^{2}). There were 1,079 housing units at an average density of 1,318.5 per square mile (509.1/km^{2}). The racial makeup of the city was 68.05% White, 13.35% Native American, 0.64% African American, 0.19% Asian, 0.11% Pacific Islander, 11.68% from other races, and 5.97% from two or more races. Hispanic or Latino of any race were 18.53% of the population.

There were 968 households, out of which 36.5% had children under the age of 18 living with them, 51.3% were married couples living together, 14.9% had a female householder with no husband present, and 28.4% were non-families. 25.3% of all households were made up of individuals, and 12.3% had someone living alone who was 65 years of age or older. The average household size was 2.65 and the average family size was 3.18.

In the city, the population was spread out, with 29.7% under the age of 18, 10.7% from 18 to 24, 26.0% from 25 to 44, 18.2% from 45 to 64, and 15.4% who were 65 years of age or older. The median age was 32 years. For every 100 females, there were 90.0 males. For every 100 females age 18 and over, there were 84.5 males.

The median income for a household in the city was $25,982, and the median income for a family was $30,547. Males had a median income of $25,104 versus $18,466 for females. The per capita income for the city was $11,734. About 14.7% of families and 16.7% of the population were below the poverty line, including 22.8% of those under age 18 and 13.9% of those age 65 or over.

== Notable people ==
- Orien Crow, professional football player
- Doug Furnas, World Class Powerlifter and professional wrestler
- Mickey Mantle, Hall of Fame professional baseball player
- Bob Seymour, professional football player
- Bo Wininger, professional golfer

== Gallery ==
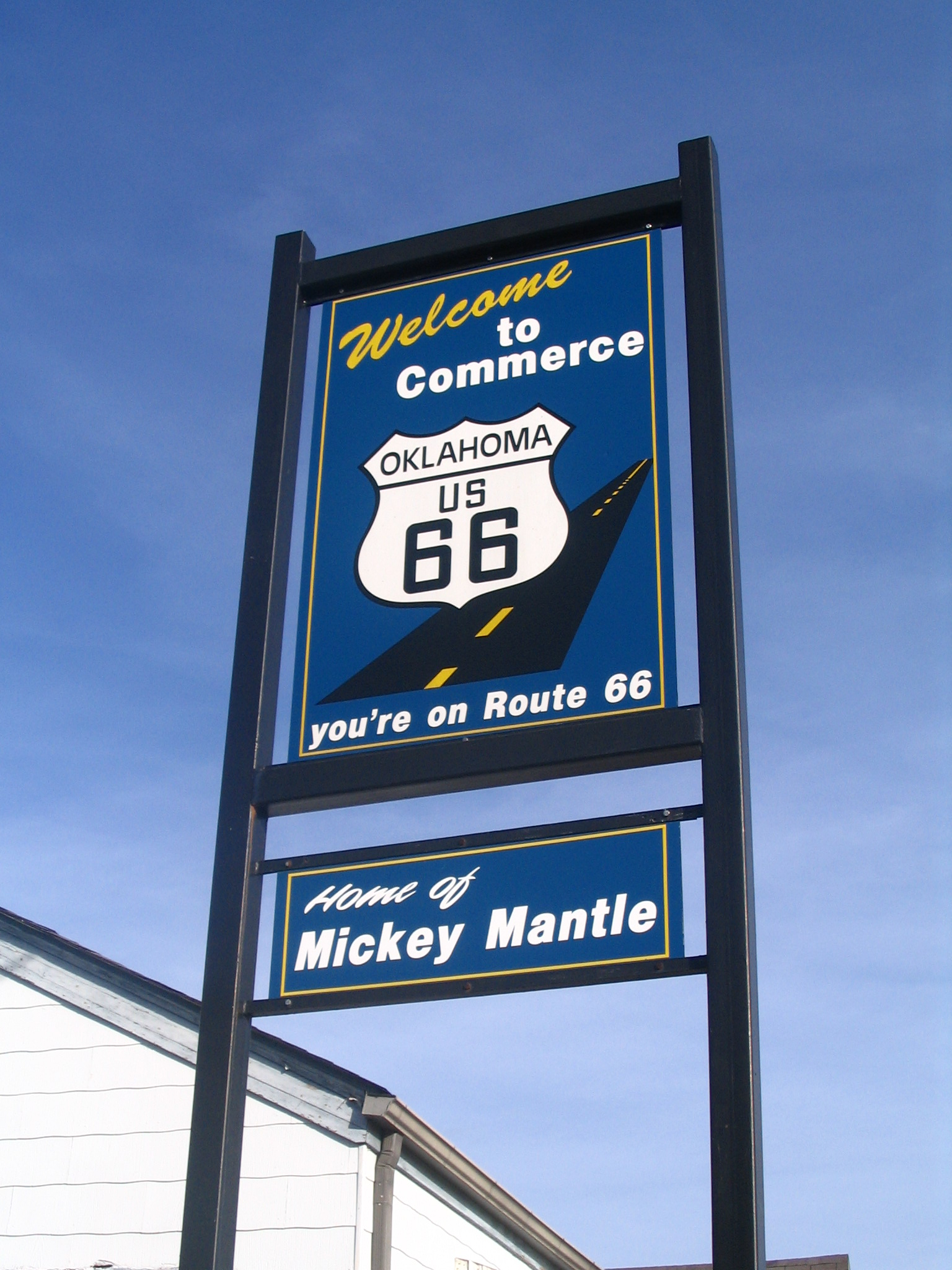
Route 66 sign in Commerce Oklahoma

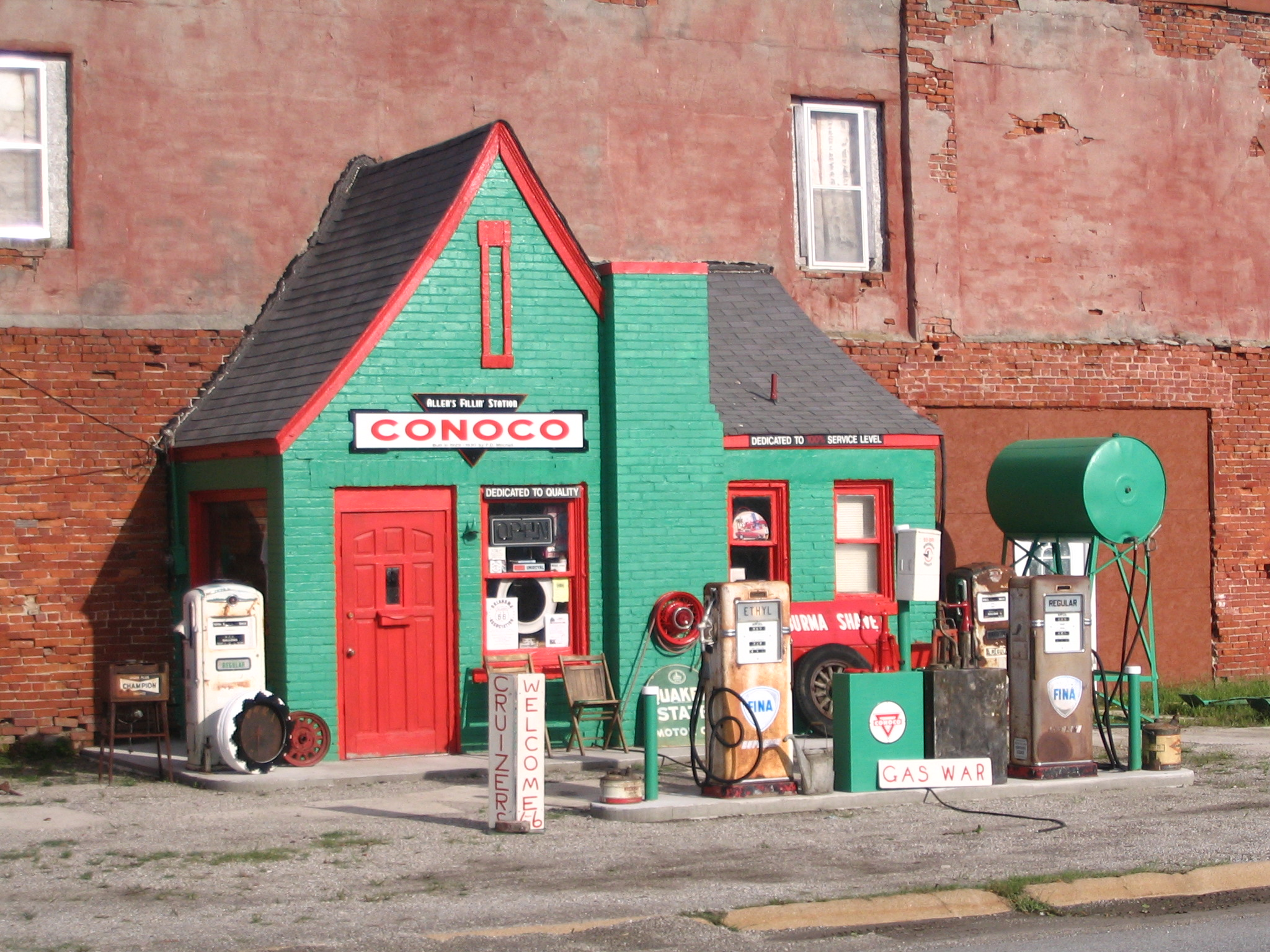
Old Conoco station, now a museum

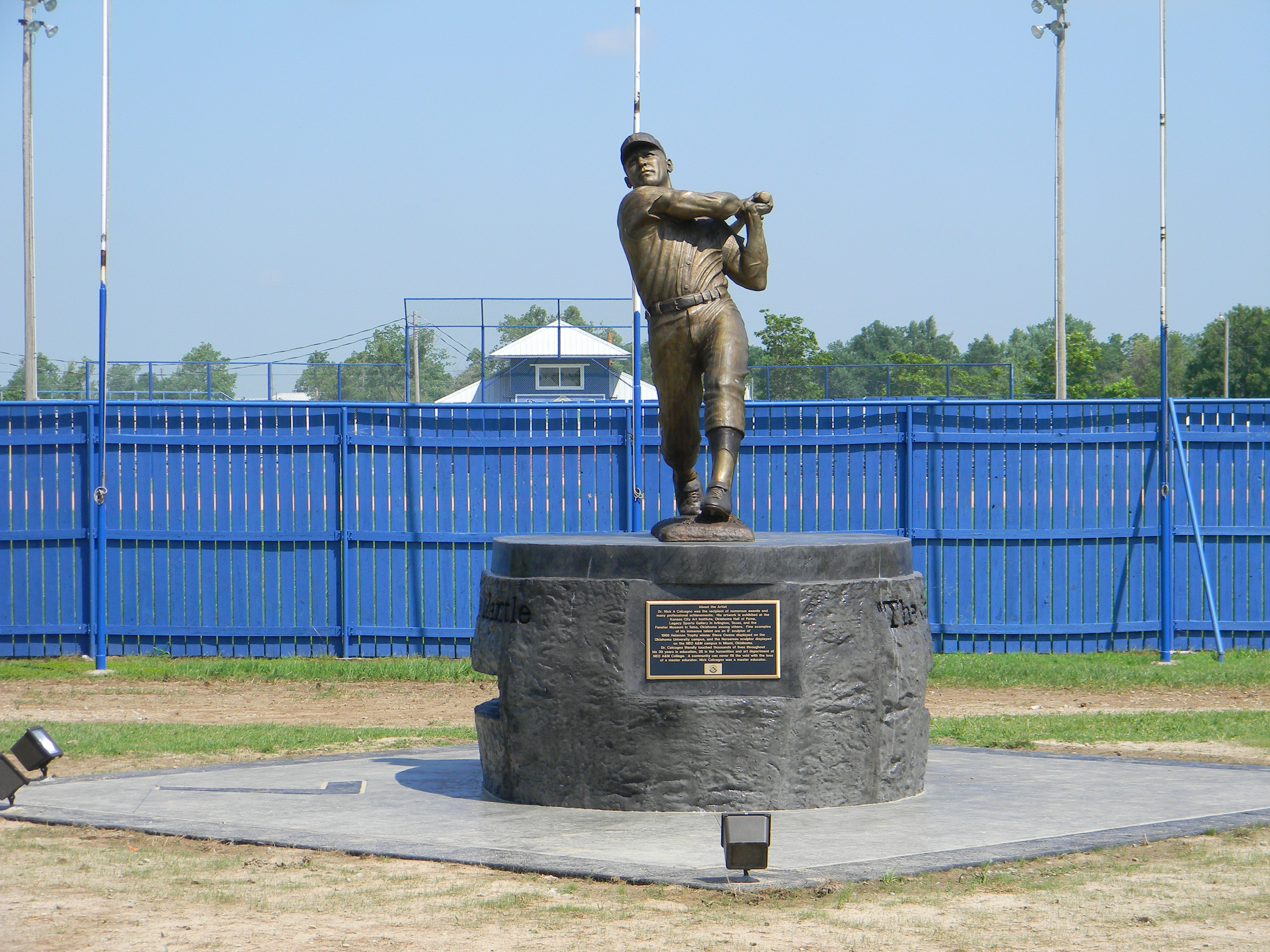
Monument to Commerce native Mickey Mantle
