= Heart (Amanda Lear album) =

Studio album by Amanda Lear
- Released: 11 December 2001
- Recorded: 2001
- Genre: Pop, dance
- Length: 40:32
- Language: English, French, Italian, German, Spanish
- Label: Le Marais Prod., Dance Street, Silver Street
- Producer: FX Costello, Laurent Wolf

Amanda Lear chronology
Back in Your Arms (1998)	Heart (2001)	Tendance (2003)

Alternative cover
- Second edition

Professional ratings
Review scores
Source	Rating
Skug	favorable

Heart is a studio album by French singer Amanda Lear, first released in 2001 by Le Marais Prod.

== Background ==
The album was recorded in 2001 at Barouf Studio and Studio Wolf with French producers FX Costello and Laurent Wolf, and was Lear's first album ever to be recorded entirely in France. It was also her first studio release of new material in six years, since 1995's Alter Ego. In an interview, the singer explained that the long gap resulted from her lack of enthusiasm after numerous budget compilations started to appear on the market without her consent. She also revealed that on this album she was given more artistic freedom than before, and decided to include more melodic and sentimental songs. Lear stated that Heart was the album "she has always wanted to make" and that originally, she planned to call it Phoenix.

The material was an equal mixture of upbeat pop-dance tunes and downtempo compositions, including covers of "Hier Encore" by Charles Aznavour, "The Look of Love" by Burt Bacharach and "L'importante è finire", originally performed by Italian singer Mina, as well as songs based on texts by the likes of Paulo Coelho and Charles Baudelaire. For the third time in her career, Lear recorded the wartime classic "Lili Marleen", this time with updated lyrics, written by Norbert Schultze shortly before his passing. Heart showcases Lear's polyglotism and is the only album to feature her singing in all five languages: English, French, Italian, German, and Spanish.

The record yielded two singles. A cover of "Love Boat", the theme song to a popular American TV series of the same title was released in June 2001. It was followed by the dance track "I Just Wanna Dance Again", released as a single in 2002, accompanied by multiple remixes. An edited version of the Pumpin' Dolls remix was used in the song's music video, directed by Kris Gautier. Both singles were moderately successful and Heart proved to be Lear's best selling album since the late 1970s in both France and Germany. It has reportedly sold 50,000 copies as of June 2002.

The album was first released in a digipak in late 2001 (nearly a year after the death of her husband), followed by a standard jewel case reissue. In the same year, the album was again re-released, this time swapping the front picture with the back cover photo. In 2002, Dance Street released Heart in Germany, with a different artwork and slightly rearranged track listing. In 2003, the album was released in Europe as Tendance, with bonus tracks and significant changes to the original track listing. 2004 saw another re-release of the album in Germany, sporting new title Love Boat and new artwork, but retaining the 2002 edition's track listing.

== Track listing ==
=== Original edition ===
1. "Love Boat" (Charles Fox, Paul Williams) – 3:11
2. "Do U Wanna See It?" (Laurent Wolf, Thierry Willems, Amanda Lear) – 3:51
3. "Tendance" (FX Costello, Thierry Willems, Amanda Lear) – 4:16
4. "Manuel do guerreido da luz" (FX Costello, Paulo Coelho) – 3:47
5. "Lili Marleen" (Norbert Schultze, Tommie Connor) – 3:47
6. "Hier Encore (Yesterday When I Was Young)" (Charles Aznavour, Herbert Kretzmer) – 3:55
7. "Porque me gusta" (FX Costello, Natacha Amal, Amanda Lear) – 4:00
8. "I Just Wanna Dance Again" (Laurent Wolf, Thierry Willems) – 3:47
9. "Vol de nuit" (FX Costello, Thierry Willems) – 4:17
10. "L'Invitation au voyage" (FX Costello, Charles Baudelaire) – 3:59
11. "The Look of Love" (Burt Bacharach, Hal David) – 4:02
12. "L'importante è finire" (Cristiano Malgioglio, Alberto Anelli) – 3:18

=== German edition ===
1. "Love Boat" (Charles Fox, Paul Williams) – 3:12
2. "Do U Wanna See It?" (Laurent Wolf, Thierry Willems, Amanda Lear) – 3:51
3. "Tendance" (FX Costello, Thierry Willems, Amanda Lear) – 4:16
4. "Manuel do guerreido da luz" (FX Costello, Paulo Coelho) – 3:46
5. "Hier Encore (Yesterday When I Was Young)" (Charles Aznavour, Herbert Kretzmer) – 3:55
6. "Porque me gusta" (FX Costello, Natacha Amal, Amanda Lear) – 4:00
7. "I Just Wanna Dance Again" (Laurent Wolf, Thierry Willems) – 3:49
8. "Vol de nuit" (FX Costello, Thierry Willems) – 4:19
9. "L'Invitation au voyage" (FX Costello, Charles Baudelaire) – 3:59
10. "The Look of Love" (Burt Bacharach, Hal David) – 4:02
11. "L'importante è finire" (Cristiano Malgioglio, Alberto Anelli) – 3:19
12. "Lili Marlene" (Norbert Schultze, Tommie Connor) – 3:49

== Personnel ==
- Amanda Lear – lead vocals
- Patrick Bacqueville – trombone
- Nicolas Baudino – flute, saxophone
- François Biesan – trumpet
- Farhat Bouallagui – violin
- Eric Cazalot – photography
- Christophe Challut – hair styling
- Christophe Dubois – drums
- Judith Flessel-Toto – backing vocals
- Sandrine Foguère – backing vocals
- FX Costello – record producer, guitar, bass, keyboards, backing vocals
- Cécile Maestre – backing vocals
- Stefano Meghenzani – piano, Rhodes, accordion
- Bernard Ortoli – percussion
- Denis Taranto – photography
- Laurent Wolf – record producer

== Release history ==
Year	Region	Format(s)	Label
2001	France	CD	Le Marais Prod.
2002	Germany	CD	Dance Street
2004	Germany	CD (Love Boat)	Silver Star
