= Beats of Love =

- 7" vinyl single cover

Single by Nacht und Nebel

from the album Beats of Love
- B-side: "Everything Is White"
- Released: 1983
- Genre: Synthpop, new wave
- Label: S.T.D., Antler, Disques Vogue, Roadrunner, Bellaphon, Boulevard
- Songwriter: Patrick Marina Nebel
- Producers: Hessel Tieter, Roger Samijn

Nacht und Nebel singles chronology
"Zafari" (1983)	"Beats of Love" (1983)	"Étoile du Nord" (1984)

"Beats of Love" is a song by Belgian band Nacht und Nebel, released in 1983.

== Song information ==
The song was written by the band's founder, Patrick Marina Nebel. Chris Whitley contributed guitar part to the song.

The single was initially released in Belgium in 1983, before becoming a Top 3 hit there in spring 1984. It was then released in other European countries and eventually sold in 150.000 copies in Belgium and France alone.

== Track listing ==
- 7" Single (Belgium, 1983)

A. "Beats of Love" – 4:00
B. "Walk On" – 5:35

- 12" Single (Belgium, 1983)

A. "Beats of Love" – 5:37
B. "Everything Is White" – 3:54

- 7" Single (Spain, 1985)

A. "Beats of Love" – 3:25
B. "Europe Cries" – 3:45

- 12" Single (Canada, 1985)

A. "Beats of Love" (Special Remix) – 5:55
B. "Victoria 2000" – 6:00

== Chart performance ==
=== Weekly charts ===
Chart (1984)	Peak position
Belgium	3

=== Year-end charts ===
Chart (1984)	Peak position
Belgium	15

== Cover versions ==
- British band Bollock Brothers recorded a cover version of the song for their 1989 album Mythology.
- In 1995, the song was covered by Belgian rock group The Clement Peerens Explosition on their album Foorwijf!. A version featuring Sarah Bettens was also recorded.
- Belgian boyband quartet Get Ready! recorded a cover of "Beats of Love" in 2002 with guest vocals from French singer Amanda Lear. The single, released by Virgin Records, reached no. 48 in Belgium. It was included on the band's 2002 album Incognito as well as Lear's 2003 Tendance.
- An electronic cover by Villa featuring The New Sins was released in 2010 and reached no. 38 in Belgian singles chart.
