= Corrado Castellari =

Italian singer-songwriter (1945–2013)

- Born: 23 September 1945; Bologna, Italy
- Died: 23 November 2013 (aged 68); Mornico Losana, Italy
- Occupations: Singer–songwriter; composer
- Years active: 1964–2013

Corrado Castellari (23 September 1945 – 23 November 2013) was an Italian singer-songwriter and composer.

== Life and career ==
Born in Bologna, in the 1960s Castellari moved to Milan to pursue his musical career. His first high-profile work was the music for Fabrizio De André's "Il testamento di Tito", while his first success was Michele's 1971 hit "Susan dei Marinai".

Castellari is mainly known for his professional association with Iva Zanicchi, for whom he composed some major hits including "Coraggio e paura". He also composed songs for Adriano Celentano, Mina, Ornella Vanoni, Raffaella Carrà, Milva, Albano Carrisi, Bruno Lauzi, Orietta Berti, Fred Bongusto, Rosanna Fratello, Nino Manfredi, and Stefania Rotolo, for whom he co-wrote with his usual collaborator Cristiano Malgioglio her signature song "Cocktail d'amore". He participated to the Zecchino d'Oro fourteen times between 1973 and 2009, winning the competition two times. He also composed several opening songs for cartoons and anime, notably "Sandybell", "La banda dei ranocchi", and "Pat la ragazza del baseball".

Beyond the songs composed for other artists, Castellari also released several works as singer-songwriter, and took part as a singer in the Un disco per l'estate festival. He died on 23 November 2013, at the age of 68; he was married and had a daughter, Melody, who is also a singer.
