= Swoope (surname) =

Swoope is a surname. Notable people with the name include:

- Craig Swoope (born 1964), American football safety
- Erik Swoope (born 1992), American football tight end
- Lawrence Allen Swoope II, also known as Swoope (born 1986), American Christian hip hop artist
- Jacob Swoope (c. 1770–1832), American politician from Virginia
- William Irvin Swoope (1862–1930), American politician from Pennsylvania
- Timothy Arthur Swoope (born 1969), Microbiologist

== See also ==
- Swoope, Virginia, unincorporated community in Augusta County, United States
- Swoop (disambiguation)
- Sheryl Swoopes (born 1971), retired American professional basketball player
