= Hier encore =

1964 song by Charles Aznavour

Song by Charles Aznavour
- Language: French
- Released: 1964
- Recorded: 1964
- Genre: Chanson
- Songwriter: Charles Aznavour
- Composer: Georges Garvarentz

"Hier encore", whose original French title translates to "Just yesterday" or "Not so long ago", is a song composed by Georges Garvarentz and written by Charles Aznavour and released in September 1964.

== History ==
It was subsequently released in English as "Yesterday, When I Was Young", in Italian as "Ieri Si", in Danish as "Hvor tiden går", in Japanese 帰り来ぬ青春 ("Kaeri Konu Seishun"), in Spanish as "Ayer aún", "Eilen kun mä tiennyt en" in Finnish, "Když jsem já byl tenkrát kluk" in Czech and "Μόλις χθες" in Greek. It is considered one of Aznavour's greatest hits.

The English-language lyrics, written by Herbert Kretzmer, tell of someone reflecting on his life, recalling how he had wasted his younger years on hedonistic pursuits, and now that he is older, he is unable to do everything that he had planned; the lyrical implication is that the person is or may be close to impending death.

== Roy Clark version ==
"Yesterday When I Was Young"

Single by Roy Clark

from the album Yesterday When I Was Young
- B-side: "Just Another Man"
- Released: May 1969
- Recorded: January 1969
- Label: Dot 45-17246
- Songwriters: Charles Aznavour and Georges Garvarentz; Herbert Kretzmer (English lyric)
- Producer: Joe Allison

Roy Clark singles chronology
"Love is Just a State of Mind" (1969)	"Yesterday When I Was Young" (1969)	"September Song" (1969)

In the United States, the best-known version was recorded by country musician Roy Clark. His version, under the English title "Yesterday When I Was Young," became his biggest hit up to that time on the Billboard Hot Country Singles chart, peaking at No. 9 in August 1969, and it became his only top 40 pop hit, peaking at No. 19. Clark performed the song at Mickey Mantle's funeral in 1995, at Mantle's personal request. In Canada, the song reached number seven on the singles chart, as well as reaching number two on the country chart, and number one AC.

=== Chart performance ===
Chart (1969)	Peak position
Canadian RPM Adult Contemporary Tracks	1
Canadian RPM Country Tracks	2
Canadian RPM Top Singles	7
France (IFOP)	33
U.S. Billboard Easy Listening	6
U.S. Billboard Hot Country Singles	9
U.S. Billboard Hot 100	19

== Other notable cover versions ==
Charles Aznavour had a European hit single with his version in 1970. Later he performed this song with Patrick Bruel in a live performance. This version can be heard on Aznavour's 40 chansons d'or album.

Amanda Lear recorded her personal version for her 2001 album Heart.

The song has been performed and recorded by many international stars, such as Bing Crosby, Shirley Bassey, Dusty Springfield, Roy Clark, Mel Torme, Jack Jones, Lena Horne, Andy Williams, Bebe Buell, Jimmy Durante, Bobby Bare, Al Martino, The Peanuts, Glen Campbell, Julio Iglesias, Tony Kenny, Eddy Mitchell, Dean Reed, Johnny Mathis, Marc Almond, Patricia Kaas, Matt Monro, Lena Martell, Nora Aunor, Willie Nelson, Elina Duni, Milva, etc., and an uptempo version by Blossom Dearie. According to Billboard, more than 90 versions of the song were recorded before 1972.

In 2008, Aznavour and Elton John performed "Yesterday When I Was Young" for Aznavour's Duos album.

In 2018, Ghassan Yammine released a version on MTV in his "Musical" show.

In 2020, Willie Nelson released a version on his album First Rose of Spring. Detroit rapper GlockBoyz Teejaee sampled the song in his track "Wack Jumper".

In 2023, Bad Bunny sampled the song in "Monaco" off of his album Nadie Sabe Lo Que Va a Pasar Mañana.

== Charts ==
=== Charles Aznavour version ===
Chart (1970–1971)	Peak position
Netherlands	3
Belgium	6

=== Tony Kenny version ===
Chart (1974)	Peak position
Ireland (IRMA)	12

== See also ==
- List of 1960s one-hit wonders in the United States
