= Cocktail d'amore (Stefania Rotolo song) =

- Official cover

Single by Stefania Rotolo
- Released: October 1979
- Length: 3:41
- Label: EMI
- Songwriters: Cristiano Malgioglio; Corrado Castellari; Marcello Mancini

Stefania Rotolo singles chronology
"Spaccotutto" (1978)	"Cocktail d'amore" (1979)	"Marameo" (1979)

"Cocktail d'amore" (transl. "Love Cocktail") is a song written by Cristiano Malgioglio, Corrado Castellari and Marcello Mancini, and performed by Italian singer Stefania Rotolo.

The song was the ending theme of the television program Tilt, broadcast by Rai 1 and hosted by Rotolo herself. "Cocktail d'amore" was released as a single together with the show's opening theme "Disco tic" by EMI and peaked at number 2 of the Italian hit parade.

"Cocktail d'amore" is considered a "cult song" by the Italian LGBT community. In 2002, Amanda Lear hosted a television program named Cocktail d'amore and released a cover version of the song as the show's opening theme. The Cocktail d'Amore queer party in Berlin was named after the song.

== Charts ==
Chart performance of "Cocktail d'amore"
Chart (1979)	Peak position
Italy	2
