= The Commerce Comet (statue) =

Statue of Mickey Mantle in Commerce, Oklahoma, U.S.

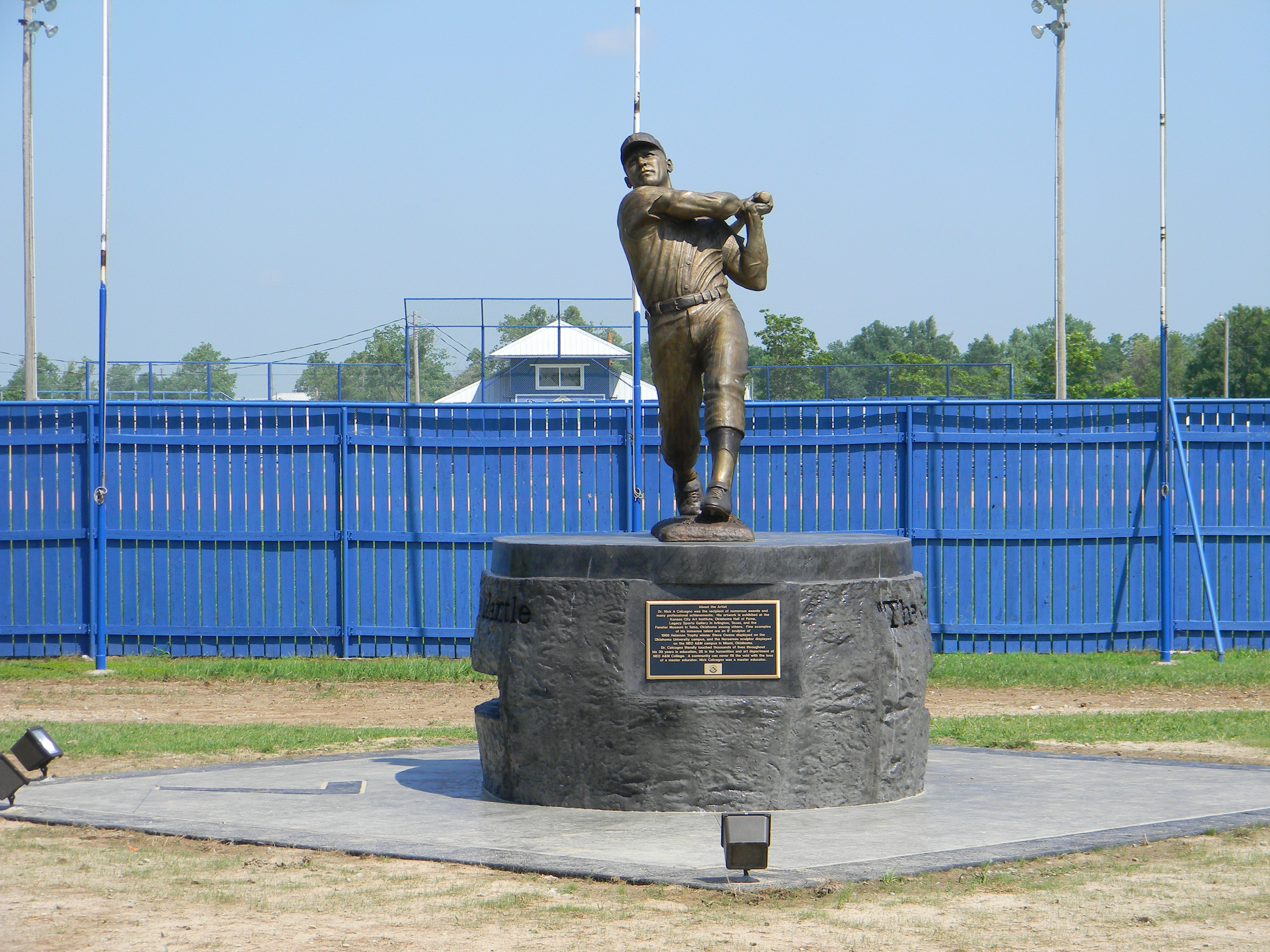
- The statue in 2010
- Artist: Nick Calcagno
- Year: 2010
- Dimensions: 2.7 m (9 ft)
- Location: Commerce, Oklahoma, U.S.; 36.924948°N 94.872106°W

The Commerce Comet is a 2010 statue of New York Yankees great Mickey Mantle, installed in Commerce, Oklahoma, United States. It is located beyond the center field fence of the baseball field at Commerce High School, Mantle's alma mater. The statue, designed by Nick Calcagno, is nine feet tall.

== See also ==
- Statue of Mickey Mantle (Oklahoma City)
