= Statue of Mickey Mantle (Oklahoma City) =

Statue in Oklahoma City, Oklahoma, U.S.

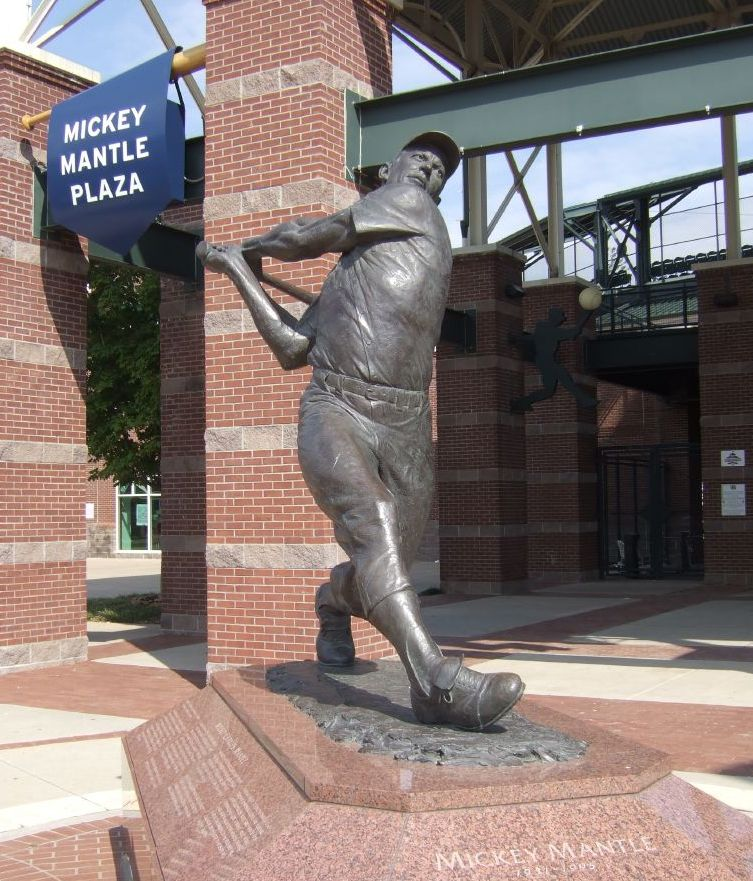
- The statue in 2007
- Location: Oklahoma City, Oklahoma, U.S.; 35.465366°N 97.508924°W

A statue of Mickey Mantle is installed outside Oklahoma City's Chickasaw Bricktown Ballpark, in the U.S. state of Oklahoma.

== See also ==
- The Commerce Comet, statue of Mantle in Commerce, Oklahoma
