= Nacht und Nebel (band) =

Belgian new wave band

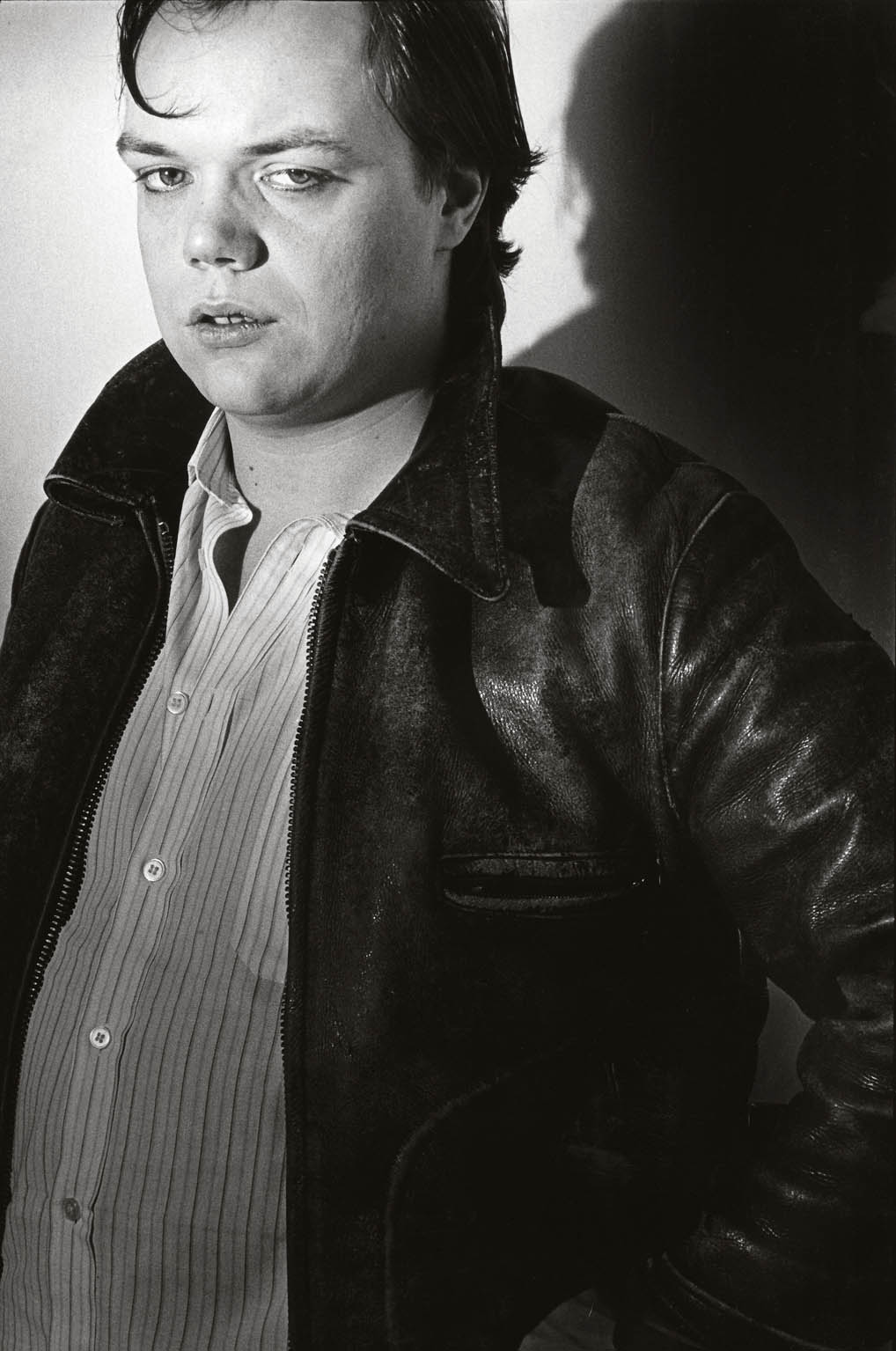
- Patrick Nebel, 1985

Background information
- Origin: Belgium
- Genres: New wave, synthpop
- Years active: 1981–1986
- Labels: Antler, Disques Vogue, Carrere, Laguna

Nacht und Nebel were a Belgian new wave band, founded by Patrick Nebel, best known for their hit single "Beats of Love". The group earned four Top 20 hits in Belgium in 1984 and 1985, before disbanding in 1986 due to Nebel's death.

== Career ==
Patrick Nebel was born Patrick Marina Schools on 23 November 1958 in Merksem and formed the band in the early 1980s. The name was a pun on Nacht und Nebel (German: "Night and Fog") – the directive designed by Adolf Hitler which resulted in the kidnapping and forced disappearance of most enemies of the Third Reich. After releasing a four-track EP Alcatraz in 1981, the band debuted with the album Casablanca in 1982, which met with good reviews but was not a commercial success.

The band's next album, Beats of Love, was released in 1983 to positive reviews and featured the eponymous track that was to become their biggest hit. The single "Beats of Love" reached the Top 3 in Belgium in 1984 and sold 150,000 copies in Belgium and France. Their next single, "Étoile du Nord", was a Top 20 hit in Belgium. It was followed by "Table for Two", a single credited to Patrick Nebel solo, which was only a moderate success.

Nacht und Nebel's third and final studio album, Victoria 2000, was released in 1985. It featured the singles "Ready to Dance" and "Victoria 2000" which peaked in the local chart at no. 14 and 12, respectively. Both songs did prove to be a larger success in the clubs. Nebel was greatly overweight and was treated in a Swiss sanatorium. He was also addicted to alcohol and prescription drugs, and suffered from heart disease. That combination proved fatal, and on 15 March 1986, Patrick Nebel died in Ekeren. The band subsequently dissolved, but released a compilation in 1986, Songs for Ever.

== Discography ==
=== Studio albums ===
- Casablanca (1982, Antler)
- Beats of Love (1983, Antler)
- Victoria 2000 (1985, Vogue)

=== Compilations ===
- This Is/This Was (1984, Antler)
- Songs for Ever (1986, Antler/Carrere)
- Essential (2005, EMI Music Belgium)

=== Singles ===
- "Movoco Synthaca" (1982, Laguna)
- "Zafari" (1983, Antler)
- "Beats of Love" (1983, Antler/Vogue)
- "Etoile du Nord" (1984, Antler)
- "Ready to Dance" (1985, Antler)
- "Victoria 2000" (1985, Vogue)

== Band members ==
- Patrick Marina Nebel (born Patrick Marina Schools) – vocals, drums, piano
- Fil Ijzerdraad (born Fil van der Auwera) – bass
- Albano Bentano (born Alban Bentein) – keyboards
- Patrick Pattyn – drums

== See also ==
- List of new wave artists
