= Swoop (Belgian band) =

Belgian musical band

Swoop is a Belgian party band, with Filip D'haeze as lead singer. It was formed in 2001 and continued until 2006. Additional members included Iris Maschelein, Kim Gyselinck, Nathalie Taling. They were signed to RELI Records and starting 2005 ARS Entertainment.

The band was revived in 2010 after 4 years of break-up. It also had a newcomer in the 2010 set-up, namely Jolien Mory.

== Discography ==
=== Albums ===
- 2010: We Like 2 Party 2 (2 CDs on Van Dijk Publishing)
- 2015: We gaan ervoor
- 2019: Bal masqué

=== Singles ===
- "We Like 2 Party"
- "Una Paloma Blanca" feat. Filip (RELI Records) (2001)
- "Speedy Gonzales" feat. Filip (RELI Records) (2002)
- "She Looks So Sexy" (RELI Records) (2005)
- "In het kleine café aan de haven" (RELI Records) (2005)
- "The Greatest Lover" (ARS Entertainment Belgium) (2005)
- "Dubi Dam Dam" (ARS Entertainment Belgium) (2006)
