= Stefania Rotolo =

Italian singer and television presenter

Background information
- Born: 23 February 1951; Rome, Italy
- Died: 31 July 1981 (aged 30) Rome, Italy
- Genres: Pop
- Occupations: Singer; dancer; showgirl; TV presenter
- Years active: 1964–1981
- Labels: RCA; EMI

Stefania Rotolo (23 February 1951 – 31 July 1981) was an Italian singer, dancer, showgirl and television presenter.

== Career ==
She hosted various TV shows on the Italian national television in the late 1970s, such as Piccolo Slam (1977–1978), Non stop (1978) and Tilt (1979). Rotolo also performed the shows' opening and ending themes, most notably "Toccami", "Go!!" and the hit "Cocktail d'amore", written by Cristiano Malgioglio, which peaked at number 2 of the Italian hit parade.

Rotolo's first and only studio album, Uragano Slam, was released in 1978.

== Personal life and death ==
Rotolo had a daughter, Federica, born in 1972 during her relationship with saxophonist Tyrone Harris. She is a pop singer who performs under the name Jasmine.

Rotolo died from uterine cancer in her native city of Rome, at the age of 30.

== Discography ==
=== Studio albums ===
- Uragano Slam (1978)

=== Singles ===
- "Toccami/Piccolo slam" (1977)
- "Go!!!/W Poncho" (1977)
- "Spaccotutto/L'amore è nell'aria" (1978)
- "Cocktail d'amore/Disco tic" (1979)
- "Marameo/Marameo (versione strumentale)" (1979)

== Filmography ==
- La mafia mi fa un baffo (1974)
