= Super 20 =

Greatest hits album by Amanda Lear
- Released: 1989
- Recorded: 1976–82
- Genres: Euro disco, pop
- Length: 79:16
- Languages: English, French
- Label: Ariola
- Producer: Anthony Monn

Amanda Lear chronology
Tant qu'il y aura des hommes (1989)	Super 20 (1989)	The Collection (1991)

Professional ratings
Review scores
Source	Rating
AllMusic	4/5 stars

Super 20 is a greatest hits album by French singer Amanda Lear, released in 1989 by Ariola Records.

== Background ==
The album was part of the Super 20 compilation series, released by Ariola Records throughout 1989, which included albums with music of the likes of Al Bano and Romina Power, Bad Boys Blue, C. C. Catch and more. It was Lear's first retrospective released on new digital format compact disc. The compilation includes songs from her first five Ariola studio albums, released between 1977 and 1981, as well as the 1982 non-album single "Fever". The CD features many of Amanda's biggest hits from the disco era, however, "Enigma (Give a Bit of Mmh to Me)", a Top 10 hit considered to be one of her most famous songs, was ignored in the final track listing, and so were charting singles "Lili Marleen", "Solomon Gundie", "Incredibilmente donna" and "Love Your Body".

The artwork is credited to Ariola Studios. The picture used on the album's cover dates back to 1978 and depicts Amanda in the same outfit she wore on the cover of the Italian version of the single "Enigma (Give a Bit of Mmh to Me)" and in the video for "Gold" filmed for the Italian TV series Stryx.

== Track listing ==
1. "Follow Me" (Anthony Monn, Amanda Lear) – 3:50
2. "Gold" (Charly Ricanek, Amanda Lear) – 3:45
3. "Mother, Look What They've Done to Me" (Anthony Monn, Amanda Lear) – 4:32
4. "Run Baby Run" (Anthony Monn, Amanda Lear) – 3:45
5. "Queen of China-Town" (Anthony Monn, Amanda Lear) – 4:09
6. "The Sphinx" (Anthony Monn, Amanda Lear) – 4:20
7. "Blood and Honey" (Anthony Monn, Amanda Lear) – 4:46
8. "Fashion Pack (Studio 54)" (Anthony Monn, Amanda Lear) – 3:52
9. "Fabulous Lover, Love Me" (Rainer Pietsch, Amanda Lear) – 4:17
10. "Diamonds" (Anthony Monn, Amanda Lear) – 3:40
11. "Egal" (Anthony Monn, Amanda Lear) – 4:08
12. "Fever" (John Davenport, Eddie Cooley) – 3:36
13. "Never Trust a Pretty Face" (Anthony Monn, Amanda Lear) – 4:45
14. "Alphabet" (Johann Sebastian Bach, Charly Ricanek, Anthony Monn, Amanda Lear) – 3:56
15. "I Am a Photograph" (Anthony Monn, Amanda Lear) – 4:21
16. "Blue Tango" (Leroy Anderson, Amanda Lear) – 2:43
17. "Tomorrow" (Rainer Pietsch, Amanda Lear) – 4:07
18. "The Lady in Black" (Anthony Monn, Amanda Lear) – 3:36
19. "I Need a Man" (Anthony Monn, Dieter Kawohl, Amanda Lear) – 3:40
20. "Nymphomania" (Pierre Macabal, Michel Gouty) – 3:27

== Credits ==
- Amanda Lear – lead vocals
- Mats Björklund – musical arranger (5, 7, 14-18)
- Harold Faltermeyer – musical arranger (5, 7, 14-18)
- Anthony Monn – producer
- Rainer Pietsch – musical arranger (5, 7, 14-19)
- Charly Ricanek – musical arranger (1-5, 7, 14-19)

== Release history ==
Year	Region	Format(s)	Label
1989	Germany	CD	Ariola Records
1989	South Africa	CD	Ariola Records
