= The Sphinx – Das Beste aus den Jahren 1976–1983 =

Box set by Amanda Lear
- Released: 1 September 2006
- Recorded: 1976–83
- Genre: Euro disco, pop
- Length: 2:52:59
- Language: English, French, Italian, German
- Label: Sony BMG Music Entertainment
- Producer: Anthony Monn, Peter Lüdemann, Roberto Cacciapaglia

Amanda Lear chronology
Sings Evergreens (2005)	The Sphinx – Das Beste aus den Jahren 1976–1983 (2006)	With Love (2006)

Professional ratings
Review scores
Source	Rating
Musikexpress	4/6 stars

The Sphinx – Das Beste aus den Jahren 1976–1983 is a compilation box set of recordings by French singer Amanda Lear, released in 2006 by Sony BMG Music Entertainment.

== Album information ==
The Sphinx features a selection of 42 tracks from Lear's Ariola-Eurodisc catalogue, recorded and released between 1976 and 1983. The set consists of material from her first six albums, which she recorded when she was signed up with the Ariola label: I Am a Photograph, Sweet Revenge, Never Trust a Pretty Face, Diamonds for Breakfast, Incognito and Tam-Tam, as well as non-album singles "Solomon Gundie", "Fever" and "Love Your Body". The compilation marked the first time some of the tracks are released on CD. All songs have been remastered.

== Track listing ==
Disc 1

1. "Follow Me" (Anthony Monn, Amanda Lear) – 3:52
2. "Rockin' Rollin' (I Hear You Nagging)" (Anthony Monn, Amanda Lear) – 3:05
3. "Hollywood Is Just a Dream When You're Seventeen" (Hanne Haller, Anthony Monn, Amanda Lear) – 4:51
4. "Magic" (Amanda Lear, Roberto Cacciapaglia) – 4:14
5. "Black Holes" (Anthony Monn, Amanda Lear) – 5:08
6. "Japan" (Anthony Monn, Amanda Lear) – 3:15
7. "Solomon Gundie" (Sintas) – 3:58
8. "The Lady in Black" (Anthony Monn, Amanda Lear) – 3:36
9. "Fabulous (Lover, Love Me)" (Album Version) (Rainer Pietsch, Amanda Lear) – 5:25
10. "Berlin Lady" (Mike Stepstone, Peter Dibbens) – 3:22
11. "La Bagarre" (Jerry Leiber, Mike Stoller, Vline Buggy) – 3:27
12. "It's a Better Life" (Anthony Monn, Amanda Lear) – 4:30
13. "Miroir" (Amanda Lear) – 2:00
14. "Tomorrow" (Rainer Pietsch, Amanda Lear) – 4:10

Disc 2

1. "Queen of China-Town" (Rainer Pietsch, Amanda Lear) – 4:15
2. "Comics" (Charly Ricanek, Amanda Lear) – 3:40
3. "Incredibilmente donna" (Sergio Menegale, Raffaele Ferrato) – 3:59
4. "Oh Boy" (Anthony Monn, Amanda Lear) – 4:30
5. "These Boots Are Made for Walkin'" (Lee Hazlewood) – 3:10
6. "Darkness and Light" (Peter Lüdemann, Amanda Lear) – 3:49
7. "The Sphinx" (12" Version) (Anthony Monn, Amanda Lear) – 5:13
8. "Diamonds" (Album Version) (Anthony Monn, Amanda Lear) – 5:25
9. "Forget It" (Anthony Monn, Amanda Lear) – 4:16
10. "Love Amnesia" (Eugene Mule) – 3:55
11. "Red Tape" (Anthony Monn, Amanda Lear) – 3:55
12. "New York" (Francis Lai, Amanda Lear) – 4:28
13. "Run Baby Run" (Anthony Monn, Amanda Lear) – 3:45
14. "Lili Marleen" (Norbert Schultze, Hans Leip, Tommie Connor) – 4:40

Disc 3

1. "Fashion Pack (Studio 54)" (Album Version) (Anthony Monn, Amanda Lear) – 5:05
2. "Love Your Body" (Peter Lüdemann, Alf Schwegeler, Amanda Lear) – 4:26
3. "Intellectually" (Charly Ricanek, Amanda Lear) – 4:15
4. "Enigma (Give a Bit of Mmh to Me)" (Rainer Pietsch, Amanda Lear) – 5:08
5. "Égal" (Anthony Monn, Amanda Lear) – 4:08
6. "Blood and Honey" (Anthony Monn, Amanda Lear) – 4:50
7. "Tam Tam" (Amanda Lear, Villahermosa, Roberto Cacciapaglia) – 3:33
8. "Fever" (John Davenport, Eddie Cooley) – 3:36
9. "No Regrets" (Amanda Lear, Paul Micioni, Massimiliano DiCarlo, Roberto Masala) – 4:26
10. "Never Trust a Pretty Face" (Anthony Monn, Amanda Lear) – 4:45
11. "Gold" (Charly Ricanek, Amanda Lear) – 3:38
12. "Ho fatto l'amore con me" (Cristiano Malgioglio) – 3:15
13. "If I Was a Boy" (Walter Foini, Amanda Lear) – 4:10
14. "When" (Rainer Pietsch, Anthony Monn, Amanda Lear) – 3:25

== Credits ==
- Amanda Lear – lead vocals
- Frank Eberlein – liner notes

== Release history ==
Date	Region	Format(s)	Label
1 September 2006	Germany	CD, digital	Sony BMG Music Entertainment
