= The Collection (Amanda Lear album) =

Compilation album by Amanda Lear
- Released: 1 July 1991
- Recorded: 1976–78
- Genre: Euro disco
- Length: 43:04
- Label: BMG-Ariola
- Producer: Anthony Monn

Amanda Lear chronology
Super 20 (1989)	The Collection (1991)	Cadavrexquis (1993)

Professional ratings
Review scores
Source	Rating
AllMusic	3/5 stars

The Collection (stylized as The ★ Collection) is a compilation album by French singer Amanda Lear, released in 1991 by BMG-Ariola.

== Background ==
The album was part of BMG's mid-price CD series The Collection, released in the early 1990s, containing back-catalogue material by artists ranging from Modern Talking, Baccara and Boney M. to Chuck Berry, Elvis Presley and Nina Simone. The compilation consisted of songs exclusively from Amanda's first two albums, I Am a Photograph and Sweet Revenge, released in 1977 and 1978, respectively. The artwork is credited to FKGB. The picture used on the album's cover dates back to the 1980s and was taken by Roberto Rocchi. In 1998, BMG re-released the album in Europe with the same title, but expanded track listing, although again not beyond Lear's first two studio albums. The cover used the same image as the "Blood and Honey" single cover.

== Track listing ==
=== 1991 edition ===
1. "Follow Me" (Anthony Monn, Amanda Lear) – 3:50
2. "Mother, Look What They've Done to Me" (Anthony Monn, Amanda Lear) – 4:32
3. "Run Baby Run" (Anthony Monn, Amanda Lear) – 3:45
4. "Comics" (Charly Ricanek, Amanda Lear) – 3:40
5. "Hollywood Flashback" (Anthony Monn, Amanda Lear) – 4:33
6. "I Am a Photograph" (Anthony Monn, Amanda Lear) – 4:15
7. "Blood and Honey" (Anthony Monn, Amanda Lear) – 4:50
8. "These Boots Are Made for Walkin'" (Lee Hazlewood) – 3:18
9. "Pretty Boys" (Anthony Monn, Amanda Lear) – 2:55
10. "Queen of Chinatown" (Anthony Monn, Amanda Lear) – 4:15
11. "Blue Tango" (Leroy Anderson, Amanda Lear) – 2:40

=== 1998 edition ===
1. "Follow Me" (Anthony Monn, Amanda Lear) – 3:50
2. "These Boots Are Made for Walkin'" (Lee Hazlewood) – 3:18
3. "Hollywood Flashback" (Anthony Monn, Amanda Lear) – 4:33
4. "I Am a Photograph" (Anthony Monn, Amanda Lear) – 4:25
5. "Queen of Chinatown" (Anthony Monn, Amanda Lear) – 4:15
6. "Blood and Honey" (Anthony Monn, Amanda Lear) – 4:50
7. "Pretty Boys" (Anthony Monn, Amanda Lear) – 2:55
8. "Blue Tango" (Leroy Anderson, Amanda Lear) – 2:40
9. "The Stud" (Rainer Pietsch, Amanda Lear) – 4:02
10. "Alphabet (Prelude in C by J. S. Bach)" (Johann Sebastian Bach, Charly Ricanek, Anthony Monn, Amanda Lear) – 4:00
11. "Enigma (Give a Bit of Mmh to Me)" (Rainer Pietsch, Amanda Lear) – 5:08
12. "Comics" (Charly Ricanek, Amanda Lear) – 3:40
13. "Gold" (Charly Ricanek, Amanda Lear) – 3:45
14. "Run Baby Run" (Anthony Monn, Amanda Lear) – 3:45
15. "Mother, Look What They've Done to Me" (Anthony Monn, Amanda Lear) – 4:32
16. "Follow Me (Reprise)" (Anthony Monn, Amanda Lear) – 2:48

== Credits ==
- Amanda Lear – lead vocals
- Anthony Monn – producer
- Nezih Özutok – design (1998)
- Roberto Rocchi – photography (1991)

== Release history ==
Date	Region	Format(s)	Label
1 July 1991	Europe	CD, cassette	BMG-Ariola
1998	Europe	CD, cassette	BMG-Ariola
