= Ieri, oggi =

Greatest hits album by Amanda Lear
- Released: 1982
- Recorded: 1976–82
- Genres: Euro disco, pop
- Length: 50:23
- Languages: English, Italian
- Label: Ariola
- Producers: Anthony Monn, Arturo Zitelli

Amanda Lear chronology
Incognito (1981)	Ieri, oggi (1982)	Tam-Tam (1983)

Ieri, oggi (Italian for Yesterday, Today) is a greatest hits album by French singer Amanda Lear, released in 1982 by Ariola Records.

== Background ==
The album was Lear's first official compilation. Her first retrospective, Golden Hits, released in South Africa in 1979, was in fact a 2-LP package consisting of the entire I Am a Photograph and Sweet Revenge albums. Ieri, oggi contains Lear's greatest hits from her disco era, adding two Italian language songs "Incredibilmente donna" and "Buon viaggio", as well as the track "Your Yellow Pyjama" from the giallo movie La ragazza dal pigiama giallo. The album was released only in Italy, prompted by Lear's new successful career as a TV hostess in that country.

The album's artwork is credited to CGD Graphic Studio. The cover pictures were taken by Franco Todesco and present Amanda in the golden outfit from the 1982 video for "Hollywood Is Just a Dream When You're Seventeen", filmed in 1982 for the Italian TV show Premiatissima.

"Incredibilmente donna" was released as the only new single from the album, with "Buon viaggio" on side B. The single turned out a Top 40 chart success in Italy. Ieri, oggi was promoted by an hour-long Italian TV special entitled Ma chi è Amanda? (Italian for But Who Is Amanda?) which consisted of music videos filmed for Premiatissima and aired in 1982 and 1983, interspersed with ironic telephone call gags. The TV special was aired on 9 February 1983 on Mediaset.

The rights to the Ariola-Eurodisc back catalog are currently held by Sony Music Entertainment. The original Ieri, oggi album in its entirety remains unreleased on compact disc.

== Track listing ==
Side A

1. "Incredibilmente donna" (Sergio Menegale, Raffaele Ferrato) – 3:56
2. "Ho fatto l'amore con me" (Cristiano Malgioglio) – 3:16
3. "Buon viaggio" (Maurizio Piccoli, Renato Pareti) – 3:33
4. "Your Yellow Pyjama" (Amanda Lear, Ritz Ortolani) – 4:15
5. "Fabulous (Lover, Love Me)" (Rainer Pietsch, Amanda Lear) – 5:25
6. "Fashion Pack" (Anthony Monn, Amanda Lear) – 5:05

Side B

1. "Blood and Honey" (Anthony Monn, Amanda Lear) – 4:50
2. "Tomorrow" (Rainer Pietsch, Amanda Lear) – 4:10
3. "Queen of China-Town" (Anthony Monn, Amanda Lear) – 4:15
4. "Blue Tango" (Leroy Anderson, Amanda Lear) – 2:40
5. "Enigma (Give a Bit of Mmh to Me)" (Rainer Pietsch, Amanda Lear) – 5:08
6. "Follow Me" (Anthony Monn, Amanda Lear) – 3:50

== Credits ==
- Amanda Lear – lead vocals
- Anthony Monn – producer
- Arturo Zitelli – producer (A1, A3)
- Franco Monaldi – musical arranger (A1, A3)
- Rainer Pietsch – musical arranger (A2, A5, B2, B5)
- Charly Ricanek – musical arranger (A2, A5, A6, B1, B3, B4, B6)
- Franco Todesco – photography

== Release history ==
Year	Region	Format(s)	Label
1982	Italy	LP, cassette	Ariola Records
