= Live in Concert 1979 =

Video by Amanda Lear
- Recorded: 1979
- Genre: Live
- Label: Jet Set
- Director: Denis Taranto
- Producer: Denis Taranto

Live in Concert 1979 is the title of a video by French singer Amanda Lear, first released in 1980.

== Background ==
The video originally consisted of highlights from Amanda's 1979 concert in Hamburg, Germany, filmed during her heyday as a disco singer and directed by Denis Taranto. The 30-minute material was released in 1980 with different covers as Amanda Lear Live and Live in Concert and featured mostly tracks from albums I Am a Photograph, Sweet Revenge and Never Trust a Pretty Face. Approximately half of the concert repertoire uses lip-synching.

In 2008, an expanded version of the video was released on DVD, including more songs, with the live material interspersed with clips from rehearsals. Behind-the-scenes footage is also included where Amanda is seen talking in French, Italian, English and occasionally German. Her husband, Alain-Philippe Malagnac d'Argens de Villèle, whom the singer had married just months before filming, also features in the video. In addition, on the 2008 DVD release a 1978 French interview was included.

== Track listing ==
=== VHS version ===
1. "Hollywood Flashback" (Intro)
2. "Black Holes"
3. "Blood and Honey"
4. "Queen of Chinatown"
5. "Enigma (Give a Bit of Mmh to Me)"
6. "Tomorrow"
7. "Follow Me"
8. "Forget It"
9. "Never Trust a Pretty Face"
10. "Fashion Pack"

=== DVD version ===
1. "Run Baby Run" (Intro)
2. "La Bagarre"
3. "Black Holes"
4. "Forget It"
5. "Hollywood Flashback"
6. "Just a Gigolo"
7. "Miroir"
8. "Blood and Honey"
9. "Queen of Chinatown"
10. "Enigma (Give a Bit of Mmh to Me)"
11. "Tomorrow"
12. "Follow Me"
13. "Run Baby Run" (Interlude)
14. "Intellectually"
15. "Never Trust a Pretty Face"
16. "Fashion Pack"

== Credits ==
- Chief operators: Pablo Salas, Yves Dahan
- Assistant operators: Jean-Paul Sergent, Bernard Guibert
- Sound: Rene Moire
- Editor: Violette Marfaing
- All songs property of Ariola Eurodisc Munich
- World copyright: Jet Set 1979

== Release history ==
Year	Title	Format
1980	Amanda Lear Live	VHS
1980	Live in Concert	VHS
2008	Live in Concert 1979	DVD
