= Back in Your Arms =

Studio album by Amanda Lear
- Released: 20 May 1998
- Recorded: 1998
- Studio: Black Cat Studio
- Genre: Eurodance; euro disco; baroque pop; dance pop; house; diva house; rhythm
- Length: 58:48 (Original edition); 55:29 (Re-release)
- Label: Dig It Int'l, BMG-Ariola
- Producer: Michael Gordon, Walter Bassani

Amanda Lear chronology
Alter Ego (1995)	Back in Your Arms (1998)	Heart (2001)

Professional ratings
Review scores
Source	Rating
AllMusic	2/5 stars

Back in Your Arms is an album by French singer Amanda Lear, released in 1998 by Dig It Int'l, consisting mostly of re-recordings of her greatest hits from the 1970s. Originally released on the Italian market, the album was subsequently re-launched in Germany by BMG-Ariola as Amanda '98 – Follow Me Back in My Arms with a revised track listing.

== Background ==
In 1998, Lear decided to re-record nine of her best known songs from the disco era for the new album: "Blood and Honey", "Queen of Chinatown", "These Boots Are Made for Walkin'" and "Tomorrow", all originally from 1977 debut album I Am a Photograph, "Follow Me" and "Enigma (Give a Bit of Mmh to Me)" from 1978 Sweet Revenge, "Fashion Pack" and "The Sphinx" from 1979 Never Trust a Pretty Face, and "Fabulous (Lover, Love Me)" from 1980 Diamonds for Breakfast. The new versions were produced by Michael Gordon, who previously had worked with Lear on her latest studio album at the time, Alter Ego. Four songs from that album were included on Back in Your Arms: the remixes of "Muscle Man" and "Angel Love", as well as shortened studio versions of "I'll Miss You" and "This Man (Dali's Song)", although the latter was misleadingly billed as a "remix". The album also contains a previously unreleased cover version of Louis Prima's swing classic "Just a Gigolo".

The album was issued by minor label Dig It Int'l in May 1998 only on the Italian market where it met with limited commercial success. It was then set to be released throughout Europe in September under the name Number 10, but in October, German label BMG-Ariola instead re-released it under the title Amanda '98 – Follow Me Back in My Arms. Since the company held the rights to Lear's early back catalogue, they replaced most of the Italian re-interpretations with original recordings from the disco era and added tracks not included on its Italian predecessor, like the new remix of the original version of "Blood and Honey" and Ian Levine's 1989 remix of "Gold". Throughout October and November 1998, the album was released in other European countries.

Two singles from Back in Your Arms were released, both as 12" vinyls only on the Italian market. The double A-side with new recordings of "Follow Me" and "Tomorrow" was released at the end of 1998. The 12" maxi-single containing four mixes of the re-recorded "Queen of Chinatown" followed in the summer of 1999. To promote Amanda '98 – Follow Me Back in My Arms, BMG-Ariola Germany released the CD single "Blood and Honey (New Remix '98)" at the end of August 1998 in Germany and the rest of Continental Europe. Later that year, "I'll Miss You" was released as a promotional CD single.

The publishing rights of the nine Dig It Int'l re-recordings were later acquired by German company Siebenpunkt Verlags GmbH, a subsidiary of ZYX Music/Mint Records. The manufacturing rights have then in turn been licensed to a large number of mid-price European labels, such as Arcade Records, Brioche Edizioni Musicali, Falcon Neuen Medien, LaserLight Digital, Jaba Music, Edel Music and many others. The rights to these recordings have also on two occasions been bought by subsidiaries to the so-called "Big Four record labels": Carosello (a sublabel of Universal Music Group, Italy) for I'm a Mystery – The Whole Story, and Puzzle Productions (Sony BMG, France) for Follow Me (1999).

Consequently, these tracks haven been re-packaged and re-released on the European market, usually coupled with recordings dating from the eighties and the nineties, as being Lear's "greatest hits" – a truth with modification. The 1998 versions are also regularly featured on various artists compilations, again usually released by minor European record labels. While these nine songs indeed are some of Lear's greatest hits, the versions contained on these compilations are not the original recordings made in Munich in the seventies with producer Anthony Monn, but those from Back in Your Arms, recorded some twenty years later, a fact that these companies usually fail to mention in their sleeve notes. The original Ariola versions are as a rule only available on albums and compilations issued or licensed by Sony BMG Germany.

Lear has in several interviews made it clear that she has no control of all these compilations being issued. The only career retrospectives to have been both approved of and promoted by Lear are Forever Glam!, released when she was celebrating her thirtieth anniversary in music business, Sings Evergreens to which she contributed liner notes, and the three disc set of Ariola recordings, The Sphinx – Das Beste aus den Jahren 1976–1983.

== Track listing ==
Original edition
Back in Your Arms

No.	Title	Writer(s)	Length
1.	"These Boots Are Made for Walking"	Lee Hazlewood	4:31
2.	"Follow Me"	Amanda Lear, Anthony Monn	4:09
3.	"The Sphinx"	Amanda Lear, Anthony Monn	4:41
4.	"Tomorrow"	Amanda Lear, Rainer Pietsch	3:40
5.	"I'll Miss You"	Ignazio Polizzy, Claudio Natili, Marcello Ramoino, Amanda Lear, Helmuth Schmidt	3:17
6.	"Enigma (Give a Bit of Mmh to Me)"	Amanda Lear, Rainer Pietsch	4:24
7.	"Queen of Chinatown"	Amanda Lear, Anthony Monn	4:15
8.	"Fashion Pack (Studio 54)"	Amanda Lear, Anthony Monn	3:40
9.	"Blood and Honey"	Amanda Lear, Anthony Monn	4:50
10.	"Fabulous Lover, Love Me"	Amanda Lear, Rainer Pietsch	4:17
11.	"Muscle Man" (Piano Version)	Amanda Lear, Helmuth Schmidt, Michael Gordon	4:15
12.	"This Man (Dali's Song)" (RMX)	Amanda Lear, Michael Gordon	4:16
13.	"Just a Gigolo"	Irving Caesar, Leonello Casucci	2:19
14.	"Angel Love" (Club Mix)	Amanda Lear, Helmuth Schmidt, Michael Gordon, Jens Jordan	3:48
15.	"Tomorrow" ('98 Dance Version)	Amanda Lear, Rainer Pietsch	6:14

Re-release
Amanda '98 – Follow Me Back in My Arms

No.	Title	Writer(s)	Length
1.	"Follow Me" (9T8 Remake)	Amanda Lear, Anthony Monn	4:01
2.	"Blood & Honey" (New Remix Version)	Amanda Lear, Anthony Monn	3:59
3.	"I'll Miss You" (Love Version)	Ignazio Polizzy, Claudio Natili, Marcello Ramoino, Amanda Lear, Helmuth Schmidt	3:34
4.	"Never Trust a Pretty Face"	Amanda Lear, Anthony Monn	4:45
5.	"Angel Love" (Radio Mix)	Amanda Lear, Helmuth Schmidt, Michael Gordon, Jens Jordan	3:47
6.	"Blue Tango"	Amanda Lear, Leroy Anderson	2:43
7.	"Queen of Chinatown" (Opium Dense Mix)	Amanda Lear, Anthony Monn	3:59
8.	"Lili Marleen"	Norbert Schultze, Hans Leip, Tommie Connor	4:40
9.	"These Boots Are Made for Walking" (Bang! Mix)	Lee Hazlewood	4:10
10.	"Mother, Look What They've Done to Me"	Amanda Lear, Anthony Monn	4:32
11.	"Muscle Man" (Heartbeat Version)	Amanda Lear, Helmuth Schmidt, Michael Gordon	3:39
12.	"The Lady in Black"	Amanda Lear, Anthony Monn	3:36
13.	"Gold"	Amanda Lear, Charly Ricanek	3:45
14.	"Tomorrow" ('98 Radio Version)	Amanda Lear, Rainer Pietsch	4:00

== Personnel ==
- Amanda Lear — lead vocals
- Walter Bassani — record producer (track 15)
- Mara Biella — backing vocals
- Jane Bogart — backing vocals
- Robert Bohlen — mixing
- Piero Cella — guitar
- Ulli Essmann — backing vocals
- Michael Gordon — record producer, mixing
- Charles Hörnemann — guitar
- Sandrina Löscher — backing vocals
- Maria Martinengo — backing vocals
- NI4NI — backing vocals
- Klaus Roeschlisberger — photography

== Release history ==
Date	Region	Format and Edition	Label
20 May 1998	Italy	CD, cassette (Back in Your Arms)	Dig It Int'l
5 October 1998	Germany	CD, cassette (Amanda '98 – Follow Me Back in My Arms)	BMG-Ariola
1998	South Africa	CD (Amanda '98 – Follow Me Back in My Arms)	BMG-Ariola
