= Follie di notte =

- Directed by: Joe D'Amato
- Written by: Aristide Massaccesi
- Cinematography: Aristide Massaccesi
- Edited by: Vincenzo Vanni
- Music by: Piero Umiliani
- Production company: Mago Film
- Distributed by: Variety Distribution
- Release date: 20 April 1978
- Running time: 95 minutes
- Country: Italy
- Languages: Italian, English

Follie di notte is an Italian erotic-documentary film directed by Joe D'Amato and released in 1978.

== Overview ==
The film introduces popular night clubs and sex venues from all around the world, including Las Vegas, Tokyo, Paris and Africa. It stars Amanda Lear, at the time at the peak of her international career as a disco singer, who acts as a guide, introducing cities and describing what they have to offer in terms of night life. Each introduction is followed by a sex scene. The film includes such sexual activities as sadomasochism, necrophilia and group sex, in addition to erotic dancing and magic tricks with the use of nudity. Two scenes depicting homosexual sex are also included.

== Production ==
The filming took place in March 1978 in London and in Rome, in a night club called Piper.

In her 1984 autobiography, Amanda Lear revealed that her footage was originally intended for another movie, a musical comedy. She claimed that she was not aware of her parts having been used for an erotic film, referring specifically to the German language-dubbed version of the film. That involved her in a long legal action.

== Release ==
Original Italian title of the film was Follie di notte, which translates to Madness of the Night. It was also distributed under an alternative title Notti pazze della Amanda Lear, translating to Crazy Nights of Amanda Lear, and internationally as Crazy Nights.

Three official VHS releases of different running times exist, with the 2003 release being the full-length 95-minute version.

In France and Germany, the film was known as Follow Me, after Lear's biggest hit at that time, before being renamed Mondo Erotico in Germany. For the German release, all Amanda Lear parts were dubbed in German by another actress. The Mondo Erotico version has been released on VHS three times, always with the same running time.

Follie di notte has never been aired on television.

== Music ==
The instrumental score was composed by Piero Umiliani. In addition, Amanda Lear performed two of her songs in the film: "Follow Me" in one of the opening scenes, and "Enigma (Give a Bit of Mmh to Me)" in the finale. "Enigma" is preceded by an excerpt from an instrumental version of "Gold" and a recording of "Follow Me" is used as a background for one of the sex scenes. All three songs come from Lear's second album, Sweet Revenge, released in 1978. In the German version, Mondo Erotico, Amanda Lear songs were replaced with a different music and the performance of "Enigma" heavily edited.

== Production credits ==
- Assistant director: Donatella Donati
- Production manager: Mario Paladini
- Unit production manager: Giulio Dini
- Camera operator: Enrico Biribicchi
- Head electrician: Mario Massaccesi
- Head light technician: Franco Micheli
- Sound mixer: Roberto Alberghini
- Scenographer: Vincenzo Medusa
- Costume designer: Sartoria Bonfanti
- Make-up artist: Pietro Tenoglio

== Reception ==
The Monthly Film Bulletin reviewed the film, stating that it was "occupying the middle ground between strip-show and freak-show" and that their attempts of titillating the audience with each new element runs "the risk of wearying their clientele"
