= Red tape (disambiguation) =

Red tape is a term describing bureaucratic regulation or standards claimed to be excessive.

Red tape or Red Tape may also refer to:

- "Red Tape" (song), a song by French singer Amanda Lear
- "Red Tape," a song by American hardcore punk group Circle Jerks
- Red Tape (album), an album by American southern rock band Atlanta Rhythm Section
- "Red Tape", a tape of prank calls to New Jersey bartender Louis "Red" Deutsch
- Red Tape, an album by Canadian rap group Social Deviantz
- Redtape Magazine, published in New York from 1982 to 1990
