= Alter Ego (Amanda Lear album) =

Studio album by Amanda Lear
- Released: 30 October 1995
- Recorded: 1994–95
- Studio: Metropolis Studio (Milan, Italy); Gadda Studio (Bologna, Italy); PNG Studios (Munich, Germany)
- Genre: Eurodance
- Length: 43:59
- Label: ZYX Music
- Producer: Michael Gordon, Tubi Forti

Amanda Lear chronology
Cadavrexquis (1993)	Alter Ego (1995)	Back in Your Arms (1998)

Alternative cover
- 1996 Italian edition

Alter Ego is a studio album by French singer Amanda Lear, released in 1995 by ZYX Music.

== Background ==
The album was recorded at Metropolis Studio in Milan and PNG Studios in Munich, except for the previously released "Everytime You Touch Me", recorded at Gadda Studio in Bologna. Alter Ego marked Lear's return to Munich, twelve years after she had last recorded there. The album was produced by Michael Gordon and Tubi Forti. The picture used on the cover is an original self-portrait painted by Amanda.

Alter Ego spawned three singles: "Everytime You Touch Me", which first appeared on the Italian compilation Hits and More earlier in 1995, "Peep!", the theme tune to Lear's erotic late night TV show of the same name which she hosted on German channel RTL II, and "Angel Love". Despite numerous remixes and promotion on TV, all three singles were unsuccessful in the charts. The album itself only met with limited commercial success and also failed to chart. The only enduring song from the album is "I'll Miss You", which despite the absence of initial success became one of Lear's trademark songs. The song was included in the 1998 compilation "Back in Your Arms" and re-recorded as a duet with German-Spanish singer Manuel Sanchez in the 2005 compilation Sings Evergreens, and is still on the list of her most played on radio songs.

The album was released in Italy in 1996 with an alternate artwork. In 2001, Alter Ego was re-released in Germany with the original artwork as part of the Golden Dance Classics series. In 2004, the complete album was re-released as part of The Queen Is... Amanda – Platinum Edition, a three disc Italian compilation.

== Track listing ==
1. "Alter Ego" (Michael Gordon, Amanda Lear) – 2:01
2. "Angel Love" (Michael Gordon, Jens Jordan, Amanda Lear, Helmuth Schmidt) – 4:36
3. "Love Me, Love Me Blue" (Giampiero Scalamogna, Amanda Lear) – 3:48
4. "Muscle Man" (Michael Gordon, Helmuth Schmidt, Amanda Lear) – 4:15
5. "This Man (Dali's Song)" (Michael Gordon, Amanda Lear) – 4:34
6. "Peep!" (Michael Gordon, Amanda Lear, Helmuth Schmidt) – 3:56
7. "Everytime You Touch Me" (Amanda Lear, Michael Gordon, Helmuth Schmidt) – 3:43
8. "On the Air Tonight" (Peter Bardens) – 3:34
9. "Rien ne va plus" (Roberto Costa, Amanda Lear, Helmuth Schmidt) – 3:46
10. "Go Go Boy (When I Say Go)" (Michael Gordon, Amanda Lear) – 2:01
11. "Dance Around the Room" (Peter Bardens) – 4:04
12. "I'll Miss You" (Ignazio Polizzy, Claudio Natili, Marcello Ramoino, Amanda Lear, Helmuth Schmidt) – 3:34
13. "Alter Ego (Part 2)" (Michael Gordon, Amanda Lear) – 2:07

== Personnel ==
- Amanda Lear – lead vocals, cover painting
- Carolina Balboni – backing vocals
- Ulli Essmann – backing vocals
- Tubi Forti – record producer (track 7)
- Michael Gordon – record producer, arranger
- Charles Hörnemann – guitar
- Sandrina Löscher – backing vocals

== Release history ==
Date	Region	Format(s)	Label
30 October 1995	Germany	CD	ZYX Music
1996	Italy	CD	Giungla Records
1997	Italy	CD	D.V. More Record
14 May 2001	Germany	CD	ZYX Music
