= Cadavrexquis =

Studio album by Amanda Lear
- Released: 1993
- Recorded: 1992–93
- Studios: Imagine Studio and SBC Studio (Paris, France)
- Genre: Eurodance
- Length: 40:50
- Label: Chène Music
- Producers: Bass Bumpers, Olivier Brochart, Philippe Chauveau, Eric Bono

Amanda Lear chronology
The Collection (1991)	Cadavrexquis (1993)	Alter Ego (1995)

Alternative covers
- German edition

Alternative cover
- Russian edition

Cadavrexquis is a studio album by French singer Amanda Lear, first released by Chène Music in 1993.

== Background ==
Cadavrexquis was a collaboration with French musicians and producers, and German production team Bass Bumpers, recorded in Imagine Studio and SBC Studio in Paris. It was Lear's first English language album since 1986's Secret Passion and marked her definite return to the dance genre. The album showcased material heavily influenced by eurodance, which in the early 1990s was reaching its prime. The title of the album is a reference to the Surrealist game of exquisite corpse (in French: cadavre exquis).

Apart from new songs, Cadavrexquis included three re-recordings of Lear's hits from the 1970s: "Fashion Pack", "Follow Me" (both with updated lyrics) and the downtempo version of "Lili Marleen". Two songs were ultimately left off the album: the dance track "Voluptas" and the melancholic, autobiographical ballad "Glad to Be Alive", paying tribute to Andy Warhol, John Lennon, Nico and other celebrities Lear knew herself.

"Fantasy" was released as the album's only single, first in Belgium in 1992, and subsequently in other countries of Continental Europe in 1993. The dance track, recorded with Bass Bumpers and mixed at Orange Room Studio in Germany, slowly grew to become something of an underground hit in gay clubs. The new version of "Follow Me" was released as its B-side in certain territories and received moderate promotion on TV, although never was released as a separate single.

Cadavrexquis was initially only released by minor French record company Chène Music and didn't gain much attention, but the success of "Fantasy" resulted in German dance major Mint Records licensing and re-issuing both the single and the album. The German edition was released with original track listing, but different cover. In 1995, Mint Records released the album in Russia, with the same track listing, but again different artwork. Despite warm reception from fans, Cadavrexquis failed to chart.

== Track listing ==
1. "Fantasy" (Single Version) (Amanda Lear, Henning Reith, Carsten Caba Kroll) – 3:55
2. "Sacrilège" (Amanda Lear, Olivier Brochart, I. Mac Ram's) – 3:27
3. "Speak of the Devil" (Amanda Lear, Olivier Brochart, I. Mac Ram's) – 3:15
4. "Fashion Pack" (Amanda Lear, Anthony Monn) – 4:52
5. "Time to Change" (Amanda Lear, Olivier Brochart, I. Mac Ram's) – 3:40
6. "What a Boy" (Amanda Lear, Olivier Brochart, I. Mac Ram's) – 3:23
7. "Follow Me" (Amanda Lear, Anthony Monn) – 3:50
8. "Loving" (Amanda Lear, David Laloue) – 3:42
9. "Lili Marlène" (Norbert Schultze, Hans Leip, Tommie Connor) – 4:28
10. "Fantasy" (Long Version) (Amanda Lear, Henning Reith, Carsten Caba Kroll) – 6:18

== Personnel ==
- Amanda Lear – lead vocals
- Eric Bono – musical arranger (tracks: 4, 9)
- Olivier Brochart – musical arranger (tracks: 2, 3, 5, 6)
- Canicule – make-up
- Matildes Charles – additional vocals on "Fashion Pack" and "Loving"
- Philippe Chauveau – musical arranger (tracks: 4, 9)
- Jacky Giordano – song selection
- Carsten Caba Kroll of Bass Bumpers – musical arranger (tracks: 1, 7, 10)
- Mario Pierotti – photography
- Roland Ragaut – co-producer
- Henning Reith of Bass Bumpers – musical arranger (tracks: 1, 7, 10)
- Felicia Uwaje of Bass Bumpers – additional vocals on "Fantasy"

== Release history ==
Year	Region	Format(s)	Label
1993	France	CD, cassette	Chène Music
1993	Germany	CD	Mint Records
1995	Russia	CD	Mint Records
