= With Love (Amanda Lear album) =

Studio album by Amanda Lear
- Released: 16 October 2006
- Recorded: May–August 2006
- Genre: Pop, jazz
- Length: 40:28 (French edition); 43:17 (European edition); 48:10 (Italian edition)
- Language: English, French, Italian, German
- Label: Dance Street, Edina Music, ZYX Music, Saifam
- Producer: Yvon Chateigner, Alain Mendiburu

Amanda Lear chronology
The Sphinx – Das Beste aus den Jahren 1976–1983 (2006)	With Love (2006)	Brief Encounters (2009)

Alternative cover
- German re-issue My Baby Just Cares for Me, 2008

With Love is a studio album by French singer Amanda Lear, released in 2006 by Dance Street. The album is a collection of covers of songs previously performed by other female vocalists.

== Background ==
The album was recorded at Blue Sound Studio in Levallois-Perret and LR Studio in Villeneuve between May and August 2006. It contains covers of evergreens and jazz standards by the disco diva's own favourite divas, among them Eartha Kitt, Dalida, Peggy Lee, Mae West, Nina Simone, Marlene Dietrich and Juliette Gréco. The album came five years after the album Heart, on which Lear covered three evergreens: "Hier Encore", "The Look of Love" and "Lili Marleen", and only a year after her covers compilation Sings Evergreens. Lear had also released an all-cover EP in 1985, A L.

The album was released by ZYX Music in Germany in 2007 with a bonus live recording of the track "Johnny", and in 2008 in Italy under the title Amour toujours (French for Love Forever) with two re-recordings of Lear's Seventies hits "Queen of Chinatown" and "Tomorrow" as bonus tracks. The album was re-reissued by ZYX Music again in November 2008, then as a mid-price release under the title My Baby Just Cares for Me, with a different artwork and without any of the bonus tracks. The digital version of the album includes both the live version of "Johnny" and new versions of "Queen of Chinatown" and "Tomorrow".

No singles were released from the album, however, a promotional music video was produced, depicting Lear performing excerpts of various songs from the album in the studio, directed by Denis Larrieste.

== Track listing ==
=== Original release ===
1. "C'est Magnifique" (Cole Porter) – 2:29
2. "Whatever Lola Wants" (Richard Adler, Jerry Ross) – 3:07
3. "Is That All There Is?" (Jerry Leiber, Mike Stoller) – 4:24
4. "Love for Sale" (Cole Porter) – 3:36
5. "I'm in the Mood for Love" (Dorothy Fields, Jimmy McHugh) – 3:48
6. "My Baby Just Cares for Me" (Walter Donaldson, Gus Kahn) – 3:37
7. "Si la photo est bonne" (Barbara) – 2:53
8. "Johnny" (Friedrich Hollaender) – 3:04
9. "Bambino" (Giuseppe Fanciulli, Nisa) – 3:20
10. "Senza fine" (Gino Paoli, Alec Wilder) – 3:17
11. "Kiss Me Honey Kiss Me" (Michael Julien, Al Timothy) – 2:35
12. "Déshabillez-moi" (Robert Nyel, Gaby Verlor) – 4:18

=== Digital edition ===
1. "C'est Magnifique" (Cole Porter) – 2:27
2. "Whatever Lola Wants" (Richard Adler, Jerry Ross) – 3:07
3. "Is That All There Is?" (Jerry Leiber, Mike Stoller) – 4:24
4. "Love for Sale" (Cole Porter) – 3:35
5. "I'm in the Mood for Love" (Dorothy Fields, Jimmy McHugh) – 3:48
6. "My Baby Just Cares for Me" (Walter Donaldson, Gus Kahn) – 3:36
7. "Si la photo est bonne" (Barbara) – 2:52
8. "Johnny" (Friedrich Hollaender) – 3:03
9. "Bambino" (Giuseppe Fanciulli, Nisa) – 3:19
10. "Senza fine" (Gino Paoli, Alec Wilder) – 3:15
11. "Kiss Me Honey Kiss Me" (Michael Julien, Al Timothy) – 2:34
12. "Déshabillez-moi" (Robert Nyel, Gaby Verlor) – 4:18
13. "Johnny" (Live) (Friedrich Hollaender) – 2:51
14. "Queen of Chinatown" (Version 2006) (Rainer Pietsch, Amanda Lear) – 4:11
15. "Tomorrow" (Version 2006) (Rainer Pietsch, Amanda Lear) – 3:33

== Personnel ==
- Amanda Lear – lead vocals, concept and titles selection
- Jun Adashi – production assistant
- Alain Bernard – keyboards, co-arranger on "Love for Sale"
- Pierre Bertrand – piano
- Lionel Campana – concert master
- Yvon Chateigner – record producer
- Christophe at Claude Maxime, Paris – Amanda Lear's hairstyle
- Julien Daguet – photography
- Christophe Galizio – drums, percussion
- Romain Joubert – pro-tools assistant
- Vincent Lépée – sound engineer
- Vincent Malléa – design
- Yves Martin – backing vocals
- Alain Mendiburu – record producer
- Leonard Raponi – musical arranger, keyboards, programming, backing vocals
- Aurélien Tourette – design

== Release history ==
Date	Region	Format(s)	Label
16 October 2006	France	CD, digital	Dance Street
2007	Germany	CD	ZYX Music
26 February 2008	Italy	CD (Amour toujours)	Saifam
November 2008	Germany	CD (My Baby Just Cares for Me)	ZYX Music
