= Incognito (Amanda Lear album) =

Studio album by Amanda Lear
- Released: March 1981
- Recorded: November 1980–February 1981
- Studio: Arco Studios (Munich, Germany)
- Genre: Pop rock, new wave
- Length: 32:10
- Language: English, Spanish, French
- Label: Ariola
- Producer: Anthony Monn

Amanda Lear chronology
Diamonds for Breakfast (1980)	Incognito (1981)	Ieri, oggi (1982)

Incognito is the fifth studio album by French singer Amanda Lear, released in 1981 by West German label Ariola Records. The album was a moderate chart success.

== Background ==
After Diamonds for Breakfast, Amanda Lear wanted to record more music to her own taste. The singer teamed up with producer Trevor Horn and started recording a rock-influenced album in London, however, Ariola Records did not approve of the material and persuaded her to work on a new album with Anthony Monn. The Monn-produced material continued to depart from the disco music which by the early 1980s had lost its momentum, and instead explored new wave music. The track "New York" was originally recorded by Francis Lai and included on his 1980 album Paris - New York. "If I Was a Boy" is a cover of a song previously recorded by Italian singer Walter Foini, with new, English language lyrics written by Amanda.

Incognito is a concept album, with every song referring to a different "deadly sin", as imagined by Amanda, including two of the original seven deadly sins. Amanda elaborated in the liner notes: "Walking incognito behind my dark glasses in a future world not so far away I see the deadly sins. Fighting to survive (it is the law of the jungle) we meet with envy, violence, greed, fear, indifference and even bureaucracy and nostalgia, this favorite sin of mine which helps to accept the future". She would also quote "Hell is who (where) you really are" from Robert Sheckley. Most tracks on the side A are a non-stop medley, a formula previously used on the 1978 album Sweet Revenge. The album's title comes from the lyrics of the song "New York", which concludes the suite on the side A.

The chansonesque "Égal" was released as the lead single from the album and was only a moderate success in Germany. Further singles, released exclusively in different territories, included "Love Amnesia" in Italy, "Nymphomania" in Scandinavia, "Red Tape" in France (backed with a French version of "New York", not available on the album) and "Hollywood Is Just a Dream When You're Seventeen" in Brazil. None of the follow-up singles were successful in the charts. The album itself was Lear's first not to chart in Germany, her biggest market up to that point, but was met with a moderate success in Scandinavian countries and Latin America. For the South American market, Amanda re-recorded three songs in Spanish: "Égal" as "Igual", "Berlin Lady" as "Dama de Berlin" and "Nymphomania" as "Ninfomanía". "Igual" was released as the single in Spanish language territories, backed with "Ninfomanía". A special Argentinian pressing of the album featured both "Igual" and "Dama de Berlin", but had "Nymphomania" removed from the track listing.

Four music videos were made to promote the album: Red Tape, which aired on MTV, Égal, Hollywood is Just a Dream When You're Seventeen and Made in France.

The rights to the Ariola-Eurodisc back catalogue are currently held by Sony BMG. Like most of Amanda's albums from the Ariola Records era, Incognito has not received an official CD re-issue.

== Track listing ==
=== Standard edition ===
Side A

1. Laziness: "Hollywood Is Just a Dream When You're Seventeen" (Hanne Haller, Anthony Monn, Amanda Lear) – 4:50
2. Indifference: "Love Amnesia" (Eugene Moule) – 3:45
3. Bureaucracy: "Red Tape" (Anthony Monn, Amanda Lear) – 3:28
4. Fear: "New York" (Francis Lai, Amanda Lear) – 4:28

Side B

1. Pride: "Égal" (Anthony Monn, Amanda Lear) – 4:08
2. Nostalgia: "Berlin Lady" (Peter Dibbens, Mike Stepstone) – 3:22
3. Greed: "Nymphomania" (Pierre Macabal, Michel Gouty) – 3:27
4. Envy: "If I Was a Boy" (Walter Foini, Amanda Lear) – 4:10
5. Anger: "Made in France" (Patrick Jaymes, Amanda Lear) – 2:10

=== Argentinian edition ===
Side A

1. Pereza: "Hollywood es un sueño cuando tienes diecisiete años (Hollywood Is Just a Dream When You're Seventeen)" (Hanne Haller, Anthony Monn, Amanda Lear) – 4:50
2. Indiferencia: "Amnesia de amor (Love Amnesia)" (Eugene Moule) – 3:45
3. Burocracia: "Cinta roja (Red Tape)" (Anthony Monn, Amanda Lear) – 3:28
4. Miedo: "Nueva York (New York)" (Francis Lai, Amanda Lear) – 4:28

Side B

1. Orgullo: "Igual (Égal)" (Anthony Monn, Amanda Lear) – 4:08
2. Nostalgia: "Dama de Berlin (Berlin Lady)" (Peter Dibbens, Mike Stepstone) – 3:22
3. Envidia: "Si yo fuera un niño (If I Was a Boy)" (Walter Foini, Amanda Lear) – 4:10
4. Ira: "Hecho en Francia (Made in France)" (Patrick Jaymes, Amanda Lear) – 2:10

== Personnel ==
- Amanda Lear – lead vocals
- Geoff Bastow – keyboards, Moog, musical arranger
- Mats Björklund – guitar
- Frank (Bolzi) von dem Bottlenberg – sound engineer
- Todd Canedy – drums
- Regine de Chivré – photography
- Wolly Emperhoff – backing vocals
- Gunter Gebauer – bass guitar
- Herbert Ihle – backing vocals
- Piero Mannucci – mastering
- Renate Mauer – backing vocals
- Anthony Monn – record producer, Moog
- Edit Prock – backing vocals
- Charly Ricanek – musical arranger
- Claudia Schwarz – backing vocals
- Angelika Tiefenböck – backing vocals

== Chart performance ==
Chart (1981)	Peak position
Norway	19
Sweden	28

== Release history ==
Year	Region	Format(s)	Label
1981	Germany	LP, cassette	Ariola Records
1981	Netherlands	LP	Ariola Records
1981	Scandinavia	LP	Ariola Records
1981	Spain	LP	Ariola Records
1981	Greece	LP	Ariola Records
1981	France	LP	Arabella
1981	Italy	LP	RCA Victor
1981	Yugoslavia	LP	PGP-RTB
