= Solomon Gundie =

Single by Amanda Lear
- B-side: "Rockin' Rollin' (I Hear You Nagging)"
- Released: 1980
- Genre: Ska
- Length: 3:58
- Label: Ariola
- Songwriter: Sintas
- Producer: Anthony Monn

Amanda Lear singles chronology
"When" (1980)	"Solomon Gundie" (1980)	"Égal" (1981)

Music video
- "Solomon Gundie" on YouTube

"Solomon Gundie" is a song by Jamaican ska singer Eric "Monty" Morris released in 1964 by Black Swan Records. It was produced by Leslie Kong with lyrics based on the nursery rhyme "Solomon Grundy". The song was later recorded by a number of artists, most notably by French singer Amanda Lear. Her version was released as a single by Ariola Records in 1980 and was a minor chart hit in Germany. Australian band Allniters released a cover of the song on their 1999 album Another Fine Mess.

== Music video ==
In the music video, Amanda Lear performs the song in and around an amusement park, riding a carousel and dancing surrounded by onlookers. The clip begins with Lear writing "solomon gundy" with spray paint on a wall and ends with her performing the last verse of the song in front of a sex shop.

== Track listing ==
- 7" Single (1980)

A. "Solomon Gundie" – 3:58
B. "Rockin' Rollin' (I Hear You Nagging)" – 3:05

- Polish 7" Flexi Disc (1981)

A. "Solomon Gundie"

== Chart performance ==
Chart (1980)	Peak position
Germany	36
