= Sings Evergreens =

Compilation album by Amanda Lear
- Released: 2 December 2005
- Recorded: 1977–2005
- Genre: Pop, easy listening, rhythm, dance pop, diva house
- Label: Dance Street

Amanda Lear chronology
Forever Glam! (2005)	Sings Evergreens (2005)	The Sphinx – Das Beste aus den Jahren 1976–1983 (2006)

Alternative cover

Sings Evergreens is a compilation of recordings by French singer Amanda Lear, released in 2005 by Dance Street.

== Background ==
Sings Evergreens contains cover versions recorded between the years 1977 and 2005, including the most recent single "Copacabana" and the re-recorded duet version of "I'll Miss You" with German-Spanish singer Manuel Sanchez from his 2005 album Ambitious (ZYX Music). The only non-cover version is "Dreamer (South Pacific)", recorded by Lear for her album Never Trust a Pretty Face in 1978. The track fades out and finishes at 3:04, although liner notes state it is the full 5:13 album version.

The Sings Evergreens compilation was issued shortly before the release of With Love, Lear's 2006 studio album consisting exclusively of new recordings of evergreens and jazz standards, originally performed by some of her favourite female vocalists.

== Track listing ==
1. "Copacabana" (Barry Manilow, Jack Feldman, Bruce Sussman, Kurt Sorbon) – 4:16
2. "Fever" (John Davenport, Eddie Cooley) – 3:29
3. "Hier Encore (Yesterday When I Was Young)" (Charles Aznavour, Herbert Kretzmer) – 3:51
4. "The Look of Love" (Burt Bacharach, Hal David) – 3:59
5. "Love Boat" (Charles Fox, Paul Williams) – 3:13
6. "Blue Tango" (Leroy Anderson, Amanda Lear) – 2:45
7. "I'll Miss You" (Duet with Manuel Sanchez) (Claudio Natili, Ignazio Polizzi, Marcello Ramoino, Amanda Lear, Helmuth Schmidt) – 3:38
8. "C'est si bon" (Henri Betti, André Hornez, Jerry Seelen) – 2:58
9. "Just a Gigolo" (Leonello Casucci, Julius Brammer) – 2:18
10. "These Boots Are Made for Walking" (Lee Hazlewood) – 4:25
11. "Lili Marlene" (Norbert Schultze, Tommie Connor) – 3:48
12. "Dreamer (South Pacific)" (Rainer Pietsch, Amanda Lear) – 5:13

== Personnel ==
- Amanda Lear – lead vocals
- Alessio Pizzicanella – photography
- Manuel Sanchez – vocals on "I'll Miss You"

== Release history ==
Date	Region	Format(s)	Label
2 December 2005	Germany	CD	Dance Street
