= Incredibilmente donna =

Single by Amanda Lear

from the album Ieri, oggi
- B-side: "Buon viaggio"
- Released: 1982
- Recorded: 1982
- Genre: Pop
- Length: 3:56
- Label: Ariola
- Songwriters: Sergio Menegale, Raffaele Ferrato
- Producer: Arturo Zitelli

Amanda Lear singles chronology
"Fever" (1982)	"Incredibilmente donna" (1982)	"Love Your Body" (1983)

"Incredibilmente donna" (Italian for "Incredibly Woman") is a song by French singer Amanda Lear released in 1982 by Ariola Records.

== Song information ==
"Incredibilmente donna" was Lear's first single, since her debut "La Bagarre", not to be produced by her usual collaborator Anthony Monn. Instead, the song was written by Italian composers Sergio Menegale and Raffaele Ferrato, produced by Arturo Zitelli, and recorded in Milan. It was a departure from the disco-dance style and showcased a more traditional pop-oriented sound with symphonic arrangement.

The single promoted Lear's greatest hits compilation Ieri, oggi, released exclusively on the Italian market. The B-side of the single was another Italian-language song "Buon viaggio" (English: "Have a Good Journey"), written by Maurizio Piccoli and Renato Pareti. "Incredibilmente donna" was heavily promoted on television in Italy. It was used as the theme song in the 1982/1983 season of the TV show Premiatissima which Amanda hosted at that time, and was played during end credits. The single was a Top 40 chart hit in Italy.

== Music video ==
The music video for the song was filmed in the bluescreen technique. It presents Amanda performing the song alternately solo and accompanied by background dancers. A different version of the video excludes the scenes with dancers and instead adds footage of the singer changing outfits behind folding screens.

== Track listing ==
- 7" Single

A. "Incredibilmente donna" – 3:56
B. "Buon viaggio" – 3:33
