= Run Baby Run (Amanda Lear song) =

Single by Amanda Lear

from the album Sweet Revenge
- B-side: "Follow Me"; "The Stud"
- Released: 1978
- Genre: Euro disco; pop rock
- Length: 3:45
- Label: Ariola Records
- Songwriters: Anthony Monn; Amanda Lear
- Producer: Anthony Monn

Amanda Lear singles chronology
"Follow Me" (1978)	"Run Baby Run" (1978)	"Enigma (Give a Bit of Mmh to Me)" (1978)

Music video
- "Run Baby Run" on YouTube

"Run Baby Run" is a song performed by French singer Amanda Lear from her second album Sweet Revenge, released as a single in 1978 by Ariola Records.

== Song information ==
"Run Baby Run" is an uptempo disco song with pop rock elements, composed by Anthony Monn, with lyrics written by Amanda Lear. The song arrangement is credited to producers Charly Ricanek and Rainer Pietsch, with whom Lear and Monn frequently collaborated during the disco era. The track is part of the song suite from the Sweet Revenge album, which tells a story of a girl tempted by the Devil.

The song was released as a single in select territories. Although the front cover of the 7" European single indicated "Follow Me" as the lead song, it was actually released on side B. In South Africa, the B-side was "The Stud", another pop rock track taken from Sweet Revenge. "Run Baby Run" was also released as a limited 12-inch single. The song was promoted by TV performances, but failed to chart.

== Music videos ==
A simple performance-style music video was filmed for the German TV show Musikladen, using the bluescreen technique. Another video was made as part of the Italian TV show Stryx. It pictures Lear dancing in a leopard print dress with other Stryx characters rolling and sliding on the floor behind her. The video was directed by Enzo Trapani and first aired in November 1978.

== Track listings ==
- Portuguese 7" single

A. "Run Baby Run" – 2:58
B. "Follow Me" – 3:55

- Belgian 7" single

A. "Run Baby Run" – 2:58
B. "Follow Me" (Part Two) – 3:40

- South African 7" single

A. "Run Baby Run" – 3:45
B. "The Stud" – 4:02

- 12" single

A. "Run Baby Run" – 3:40
B. "Follow Me (Reprise)" – 3:40
