= Diamonds (Amanda Lear song) =

Single by Amanda Lear

from the album Diamonds for Breakfast
- B-side: "It's a Better Life"
- Released: 1979
- Recorded: 1979
- Genre: Pop
- Length: 4:55 (album version); 3:40 (single edit)
- Label: Ariola Records
- Songwriters: Anthony Monn, Amanda Lear
- Producer: Anthony Monn

Amanda Lear singles chronology
"Fabulous (Lover, Love Me)" (1979)	"Diamonds" (1979)	"Japan" (1980)

"Diamonds" is a song by the French singer Amanda Lear, released in 1979 by Ariola Records as the second single from her album Diamonds for Breakfast.

== Song information ==
The song was composed and produced by Anthony Monn, Lear's long-time collaborator in the disco era, and is an uptempo pop track. Lear's lyrics are a praise for diamonds, which she says for her are "just the best" and "better than pearls", adding, "I eat diamonds for my breakfast."

"Diamonds" was released as the second single preceding Lear's fourth album, Diamonds for Breakfast, at the end of 1979. The B-side was "It's a Better Life", a track about a so-called "couch potato" spending her days in front of TV, which was later also included on the album. The single was a moderate chart success across Europe, especially in Scandinavia, where it was a top 10 hit in Norway and remains Lear's only charting single in that country.

In the 2017 book Europe's Stars of '80s Dance Pop, the song is mentioned as one of Lear's "noteworthy tracks" from the 1980s.

== Music video ==
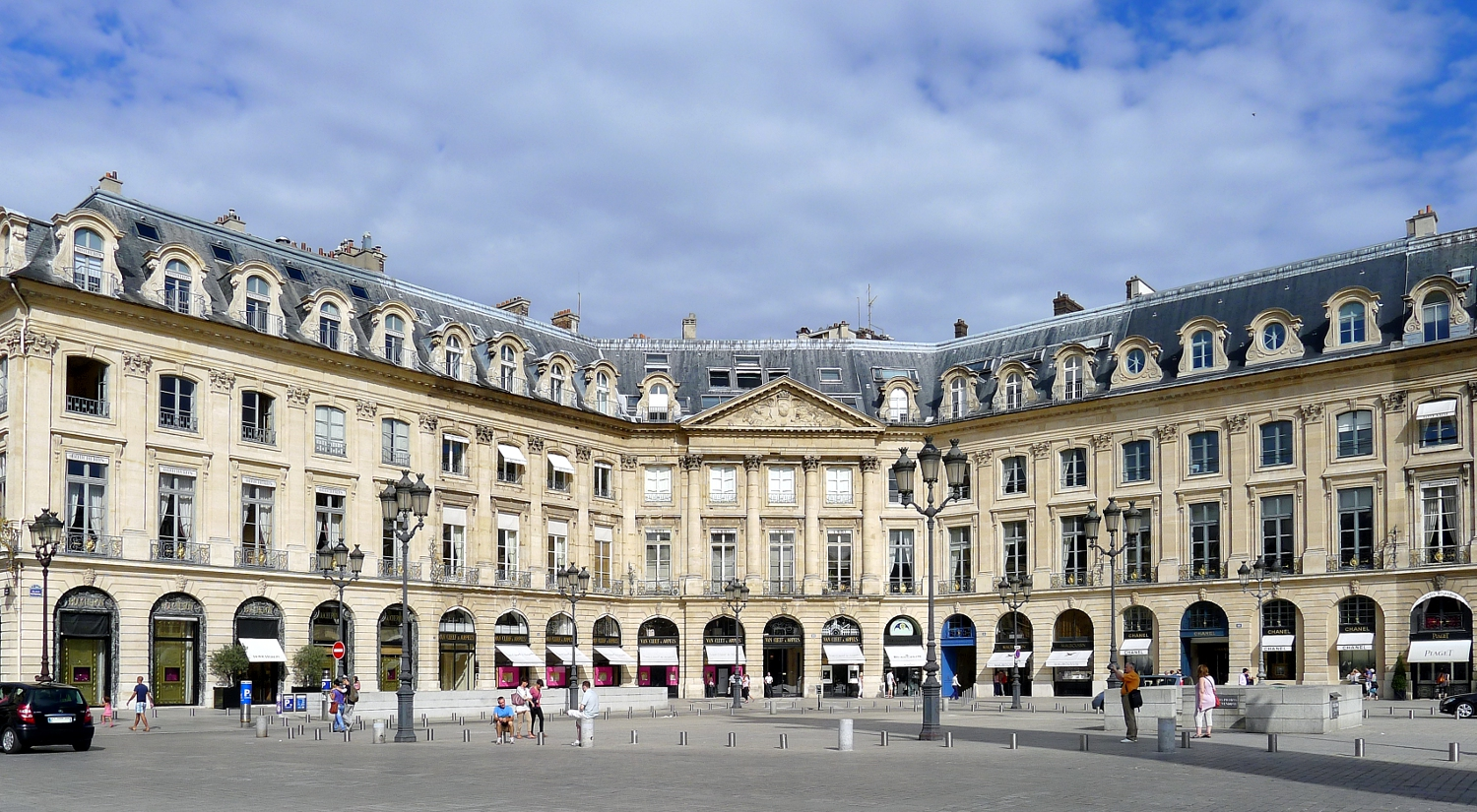
Place Vendôme, Paris, where the video was filmed

The music video for "Diamonds" was filmed in Paris. It primarily consists of footage of Lear dancing and performing the song in front of the Van Cleef & Arpels boutique in Place Vendôme. The video also includes scenes of the singer in a bath and eating breakfast in bed.

== Track listing ==
- 7" single

A. "Diamonds" – 3:40
B. "It's a Better Life" – 4:40

== Chart performance ==
Chart (1980)	Peak position
Germany	30
Norway	7
Sweden	18
