= Love Your Body =

- 7" single cover

Single by Amanda Lear
- B-side: "Darkness and Light"
- Released: 1983
- Genre: Synthpop
- Length: 4:26
- Label: Ariola Records
- Songwriters: Peter Lüdemann, Alf Schwegeler, Amanda Lear
- Producer: Peter Lüdemann

Amanda Lear singles chronology
"Incredibilmente donna" (1982)	"Love Your Body" (1983)	"No Regrets" (1983)

Alternative cover
- 12" single cover

"Love Your Body" is a song by French singer Amanda Lear released in 1983 by Ariola Records.

== Song information ==
The song was written by Peter Lüdemann, Alf Schwegeler and Amanda Lear, and was produced by Lüdemann. It is a Hi-NRG synthpop track and its lyrics reference the aerobics craze of the early 1980s, hence the caption "It's aerobic time" on the 12" single cover. It was Amanda's last single recorded in Munich and released by German division of Ariola Records. The B-side of the single was "Darkness and Light", stylistically similar to "Love Your Body,” written by Lüdemann and Lear.

"Love Your Body"/"Darkness and Light" was released as a standalone single between Lear's fifth and sixth studio album. Despite considerable promotion on TV, it met with minor success and only charted in Belgium. Both songs had not appeared on an album until 2006, when the 3 CD box set The Sphinx – Das Beste aus den Jahren 1976–1983 was released in Germany.

In the 2017 book Europe's Stars of '80s Dance Pop, the song is mentioned as one of Lear's "noteworthy tracks" from the 80s.

== Music video ==
The music video for the song was filmed in the chroma key technique. It pictures Amanda in a tribal outfit accompanied by muscular men and a group of people performing aerobic routines.

== Track listing ==
- 7" Single

A. "Love Your Body" – 4:26
B. "Darkness and Light" – 3:58

- 12" Single

A. "Love Your Body" – 6:00
B. "Darkness and Light" – 4:44

== Chart performance ==
Chart (1983)	Peak position
Belgium	29
