= Alphabet (Amanda Lear song) =

Single by Amanda Lear

from the album I Am a Photograph
- B-side: "Queen of Chinatown"
- Released: 1977
- Genre: Euro disco
- Length: 4:00
- Label: Ariola Records
- Songwriters: Johann Sebastian Bach, Amanda Lear
- Producer: Anthony Monn

Amanda Lear singles chronology
"Blue Tango" (1977)	"Alphabet" (1977)	"Queen of Chinatown" (1977)

"Alphabet" is a song by French singer Amanda Lear, released as a single from her debut album I Am a Photograph in 1977 by Ariola Records.

== Song information ==
"Alphabet" is a mid-tempo disco song, arranged by Charly Ricanek and Anthony Monn, and is largely based on the melody from Johann Sebastian Bach's Prelude and Fugue in C major, BWV 846. Autobiographical lyrics were written by Amanda Lear and include her personal associations with each letter of the alphabet recited over the music. In a 2013 interview, Lear stated that "Alphabet" was "the first song to be completely just spoken onto classical music".

The song carries a subtitle "Prelude in C by J. S. Bach" in the track listing of its parent album, and was also known as "My Alphabet" when released as the B-side on the single "Queen of Chinatown". French- and Italian-language versions of the song were also recorded, entitled "Mon alphabet" and "Alfabeto", respectively. "Mon alphabet" was the B-side on the single "Tomorrow", released in France earlier that year.

"Alphabet", just like the previous single, "Blue Tango", at that time was only released in the Netherlands. "Queen of Chinatown" made the B-side, however, it would become Lear's next single the same year. "Alphabet" was not a commercial success and did not chart. In 2015, the track was used in a Louis Vuitton jewelry advert.

== Music video ==
The music video was directed by Michael Leckebusch for German TV show Musikladen. It used the chroma key technique, and shows Amanda Lear performing the song with respective letters of the alphabet in Brush Script appearing in the background. The music video was released on a 3-DVD box set Das beste aus dem Musikladen Vol. 1 in 2012, together with ten other videos that Lear had made for Musikladen.

== Track listing ==
- 7" Single

A. "Alphabet" – 4:00
B. "Queen of China-Town" – 4:15
