= Red Tape (song) =

Single by Amanda Lear

from the album Incognito
- B-side: "New York"
- Released: 1981
- Genre: Pop
- Length: 3:55
- Label: Ariola
- Songwriters: Anthony Monn, Amanda Lear
- Producer: Anthony Monn

Amanda Lear singles chronology
"Nymphomania" (1981)	"Red Tape" (1981)	"Hollywood Is Just a Dream When You're Seventeen" (1981)

"Red Tape" is a song by French singer Amanda Lear released in 1981 by Ariola Records as the single from her album Incognito.

== Song information ==
"Red Tape" was composed and produced by Anthony Monn, Lear's long-time collaborator, and is a pop song with rock influences. In the song's lyrics, Lear criticises so-called "red tape", complaining about its inquisitiveness and the lack of privacy it imposes. She sings: "I want to keep my privacy, Big Brother is watching me". On its parent album, where every song stands for a "deadly sin", "Red Tape" represents bureaucracy.

The song was released as a single only in France, with a French-language version of "New York" on side B, which was not available on the album. The single did not chart.

In the 2017 book Europe's Stars of '80s Dance Pop, the song is mentioned as one of Lear's "noteworthy tracks" from the 80s.

== Music video ==
The music video depicts Lear clad in a futuristic outfit and sunglasses, playing Rubik's Cube. The video aired on MTV in Europe.

== Track listing ==
- 7" Single

A. "Red Tape" – 3:55
B. "New York" – 4:28
