= Égal (song) =

Single by Amanda Lear

from the album Incognito
- Released: 1981
- Genre: Pop
- Length: 4:08
- Label: Ariola
- Songwriters: Anthony Monn, Amanda Lear
- Producer: Anthony Monn

Amanda Lear singles chronology
"Solomon Gundie" (1980)	"Égal" (1981)	"Love Amnesia" (1981)

"Égal" (also known as "Egal" and "Ça m'est égal" (French for "I Don't Care")) is a song by French singer Amanda Lear released in 1981 by Ariola Records as the single from her album Incognito.

== Song information ==
The song was composed and produced by Anthony Monn, Lear's long-time collaborator, and is a downtempo pop track arranged in the style of chanson. The lyrics, written by Amanda Lear in French, tell about a relationship breakup and are directed at a man who has left her broken hearted. The singer reveals that now she has got over him and is ready to move on with her life. On its parent album, where every song stands for a "deadly sin", "Égal" represents pride.

"Égal" was released as the single in spring 1981 to promote the album Incognito, with "If I Was a Boy" as the B-side on most releases. In France, the song was billed as "Ça m'est égal" and included "Made in France" on side B. The French single also had a different covert art, sporting a photo of Amanda taken by her husband Alain-Philippe Malagnac. The song was also recorded in Spanish as "Igual" and released as the single in Spanish-speaking territories, backed with a Spanglish version of "Nymphomania". The song only met with a minor success in Germany and was Amanda's last chart entry in that country.

== Music video ==
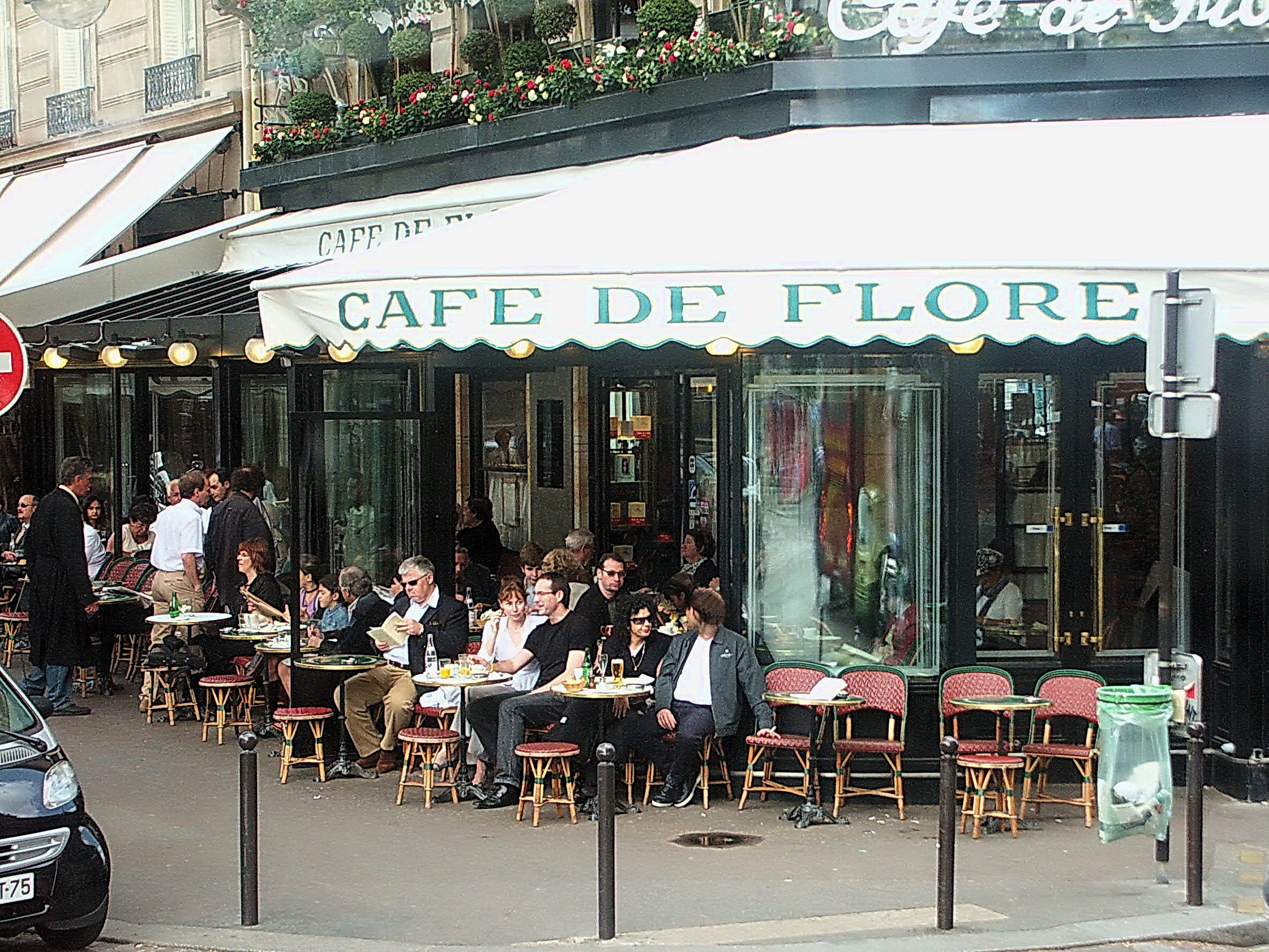
Café de Flore, Paris, where the entire music video was filmed

The music video for the track was filmed in Paris, in a famous coffeehouse Café de Flore, located at the corner of Boulevard Saint-Germain and Rue Saint-Benoît. It pictures Amanda Lear at the table in the outdoor sitting area on the ground floor, smoking a Marlboro cigarette and writing a letter to her ex-lover.

== Track listing ==
- 7" Single (1981)

A. "Égal" – 4:08
B. "If I Was a Boy" – 4:10

- French 7" Single (1981)

A. "Ça m'est égal" – 4:08
B. "Made in France" – 2:10

- Spanish 7" Single (1981)

A. "Igual (Égal)" – 4:06
B. "Ninfomanía" – 3:12

- Chilean 7" Single (1982)

A. "Igual" – 4:03
B. "Hecho en Francia" – 2:10

== Chart performance ==
Chart (1981)	Peak position
Germany	75
