= Diamonds for Breakfast =

Studio album by Amanda Lear
- Released: 1980
- Genres: Pop rock, euro disco
- Length: 39:15
- Languages: English, Italian
- Label: Ariola
- Producer: Anthony Monn

Amanda Lear chronology
Never Trust a Pretty Face (1979)	Diamonds for Breakfast (1980)	Incognito (1981)

Diamonds for Breakfast is the fourth studio album by French singer Amanda Lear, released in 1980 by the West German label Ariola Records. The album turned out a commercial success and spawned two European hit singles, "Fabulous (Lover, Love Me)" and "Diamonds".

== Background ==
The recording of the album commenced in 1979 in Munich, Germany. Again, Amanda wrote almost all the lyrics and worked with German producer and composer Anthony Monn. However, as a result of changing trends in the industry and Amanda's personal musical preferences, the album shifted from straightforward post-disco music towards pop rock, and Lear herself renounced her affiliation with the disco style and the "disco queen" image. The singer explained the title Diamonds for Breakfast in the liner notes, comparing diamonds to "every tear, every frustration, every heartache (...). Good and bad experiences, pleasure and pain". She went on to say she pities "people without feelings, they don't have diamonds for breakfast".

The album cover portrait of Lear, with Tiffany-designed diamond tears running down her cheek, is notable in the history of art and design as it was one of the first major assignments for French photographers Pierre et Gilles.

"Fabulous (Lover, Love Me)", released as the lead single in 1979, was a Top 10 hit in Sweden and a minor chart success in Germany. The second single, "Diamonds", was commercially successful as well, performing best in Norway, where it reached the Top 10. Three more singles were selected for different territories: "When" was released in Sweden, "Ho fatto l'amore con me" in Italy and France, and "Japan" was chosen for the Japanese market.

The Italian pressing of Diamonds for Breakfast included Italian language versions of "Insomnia" and "When", the former featuring guest vocals by Amanda's husband Alain-Philippe Malagnac d'Argens de Villèle. The album was met with a commercial success. It was Lear's breakthrough album in the Scandinavia, placing within the Top 10 in Sweden and Norway. However, it reported disappointing sales in Germany, her biggest market up to that point, charting outside the Top 40.

The rights to the Ariola-Eurodisc back catalogue are currently held by Sony BMG. Like most of Amanda's albums from the Ariola Records era, Diamonds for Breakfast has not received the official CD re-issue, excluding Russian bootleg re-releases.

== Track listing ==
=== Standard edition ===
Side A

1. "Rockin' Rollin' (I Hear You Nagging)" (Anthony Monn, Amanda Lear) – 3:05
2. "I Need a Man" (Anthony Monn, Dieter Kawohl, Amanda Lear) – 3:40
3. "It's a Better Life" (Anthony Monn, Amanda Lear) – 4:30
4. "Oh Boy" (Anthony Monn, Amanda Lear) – 4:30
5. "Insomnia" (Charly Ricanek, Amanda Lear) – 3:15

Side B

1. "Diamonds" (Anthony Monn, Amanda Lear) – 4:55
2. "Japan" (Anthony Monn, Amanda Lear) – 3:15
3. "Fabulous (Lover, Love Me)" (Rainer Pietsch, Amanda Lear) – 5:25
4. "Ho fatto l'amore con me" (Cristiano Malgioglio) – 3:15
5. "When" (Rainer Pietsch, Anthony Monn, Amanda Lear) – 3:25

=== Italian edition ===
Side A

1. "Rockin' Rollin' (I Hear You Nagging)" (Anthony Monn, Amanda Lear) – 3:05
2. "I Need a Man" (Anthony Monn, Dieter Kawohl, Amanda Lear) – 3:40
3. "It's a Better Life" (Anthony Monn, Amanda Lear) – 4:30
4. "Oh Boy" (Anthony Monn, Amanda Lear) – 4:30
5. "Insomnia" (Italian Version) (Charly Ricanek, Amanda Lear) – 3:15

Side B

1. "Ciao" ("When" - Italian Version) (Rainer Pietsch, Anthony Monn, Amanda Lear) – 3:25
2. "Ho fatto l'amore con me" (Alternative Version) (Cristiano Malgioglio, Maria Antonietta Sisini, Giuni Russo) – 3:15
3. "Diamonds" (Anthony Monn, Amanda Lear) – 4:55
4. "Japan" (Anthony Monn, Amanda Lear) – 3:15
5. "Fabulous (Lover, Love Me)" (Rainer Pietsch, Amanda Lear) – 5:25

== Personnel ==
- Amanda Lear – lead vocals
- Mats Björklund – bass guitar
- Frank (Bolzi) von dem Bottlenberg – engineer
- Lance Dixon – keyboards
- Dave Dowle – drums
- Wolly Emperhoff – backing vocals
- Jürgen Fritz – keyboards
- Martin Harrison – drums
- Les Hurdle – bass guitar
- Herbert Ihle – backing vocals
- Renate Mauer – backing vocals
- Anthony Monn – record producer, synthesizer, backing vocals
- Pierre et Gilles – artwork
- Rainer Pietsch – arranger, backing vocals
- Edith Prock – backing vocals
- Charly Ricanek – arranger, keyboards, synthesizer
- Claudia Schwarz – backing vocals
- Gary Unwin – bass guitar
- Gitta Walther – backing vocals

== Chart performance ==
Chart (1980)	Peak position
Austria	11
Germany	43
Norway	10
Sweden	4

== Release history ==
Year	Region	Format(s)	Label
1980	Italy	LP, cassette	RCA Victor
1980	Germany	LP, cassette	Ariola Records
1980	Spain	LP	Ariola Records
1980	Sweden	LP	Ariola Records
1980	United Kingdom	LP	Ariola Records
1980	Australia	LP	Ariola Records
1980	Canada	LP	Quality Records
1980	France	LP	Arabella
1980	Portugal	LP	PolyGram
1980	Greece	LP	Epic Records
1980	Yugoslavia	LP	PGP-RTB
