= Follow Me (Amanda Lear song) =

Single by Amanda Lear

from the album Sweet Revenge
- B-side: "Mother, Look What They've Done to Me"
- Released: 1978
- Genre: Euro disco; proto hi-NRG
- Length: 3:52
- Label: Ariola
- Songwriters: Anthony Monn, Amanda Lear
- Producer: Anthony Monn

Amanda Lear singles chronology
| "Queen of Chinatown" (1977) | "Follow Me" (1978) | "Run Baby Run" (1978) |

Music video
- "Follow Me" on YouTube

"Follow Me" is a song by French singer Amanda Lear released in 1978 by Ariola Records as the lead single from her second album, Sweet Revenge. The song went on to become a multi-million-selling chart success in Continental Europe and remains one of her trademark hits.

== Song information ==
The lyrics of the song were written by Lear herself, who contributed words to every track on Sweet Revenge, and the music was composed by Anthony Monn, her long-time producer and collaborator. Musically, "Follow Me" showcased a mainstream disco sound, which in the second half of the 1970s was at the peak of its popularity, however, with symphonic elements, and inspired by the innovatory work of German band Kraftwerk. Lyrically, the song tells about seduction as the first track in conceptual suite on side A, which tells a story about a girl tempted by the Devil. The suite is concluded with an alternative version of the song, billed as "Follow Me (Reprise)", which contains different lyrics and sees the girl reject the Devil's offers. The 10-minute Wally MacDonald remix of the song was released in Canada, which in fact was a medley of the original version and the reprise.

"Follow Me" was released as the first single from Amanda's second album, Sweet Revenge, in the spring of 1978. In most countries, the B-side of the single was "Mother, Look What They've Done to Me". The only exception to this in Europe was Spain, with "Run Baby Run" on side B, although the song would also be released as a separate A-side in selected territories. In Canada, the B-side was "Enigma (Give a Bit of Mmh to Me)", later released as a single in its own right in Europe.

The song was a major commercial success, reaching the top 10 in no less than six European countries. In Germany, it was the sixth biggest-selling single of 1978, and in Belgium – the second, only behind John Travolta and Olivia Newton-John's "You're the One That I Want". It remains Amanda's signature song and arguably her biggest hit to date, having sold several million copies worldwide. The singer performed the track in numerous television shows across Europe as well as in the erotic Italian documentary film Follie di notte (1978) in which she appeared as the hostess. The song was also featured in the film Dallas Buyers Club (2013).

A new version of the song was released as the single in 1987, remixed by Christian De Walden who produced Lear's most recent album at the time, Secret Passion. In 1989, DJ Ian Levine produced hi-NRG remixes of "Gold" and "Follow Me", which were released as a commercial double A-side single on both vinyl and CD.

Lear re-recorded the song with slightly changed lyrics in 1992 and the new version appeared on her 1993 album Cadavrexquis as well as side B of the single "Fantasy". It was performed at concerts and on television. Another re-recording appeared on the 1998 album Back in Your Arms and later released in Italy as the double A-side 12" vinyl single with "Tomorrow". This version would subsequently end up on numerous budget compilations released in Europe up until the early 2010s.

In 2000, a new version of the song was included on a various artists compilation released to celebrate Paris Pride. Also in 2000, the 1978 version was released as the CD single in Belgium as part of the "45 Hit Collection" series, back with the original version of "The Sphinx". The song was also included on the soundtrack of the 2014 French film The New Girlfriend. Most recently, "Follow Me" was re-recorded again on Lear's 2016 album Let Me Entertain You. In 2023, the original 1978 song was used in a Chanel worldwide advertisement campaign for the fragrance Coco Mademoiselle, in a one-minute film directed by Joseph Kosinski and starring Whitney Peak. The song gained a new following and was searched one million times on the global Shazam charts in June 2023. For the occasion, the 2016 mix of the song was released as a digital single in June 2023, and subsequently gained one million stream on Spotify in one month, boosted by the streams of the 1978 version.

== Music videos ==
In 1978, Amanda Lear filmed the "Follow Me" music video as part of her television special for German TV show Musikladen. Based on the bluescreen technique, it pictures her performing the song against a starry night sky and images of her from the Sweet Revenge album cover. She is clad in a bright pink catsuit, which she initially hides underneath a long black cape. It was directed by Michael Leckebusch. In 2012, the video was released on a 3-DVD box set Das beste aus dem Musikladen Vol. 1, together with other videos Lear had made for Musikladen.

Also in 1978, another video for the song was filmed, this time as part of Italian TV show Stryx. Amanda again wore the black cape, but with a different outfit underneath it. The video was directed by Enzo Trapani. Lear filmed another bluescreen "Follow Me" video for her Italian TV show Premiatissima which was later used in her television special Ma chi è Amanda? (1983).

Another music video was produced for the 1992 re-recording, with Amanda Lear performing the song against a green background.

== Track listing ==
- 7" Single (1978)

A. "Follow Me" – 3:52
B. "Mother, Look What They've Done to Me" – 4:25

- Spanish 7" Single (1978)

A. "Follow Me (Sigueme)" – 3:55
B. "Run Baby Run" – 4:25

- Canadian 12" Single (1978)

A. "Follow Me" – 10:48
B. "Enigma (Give a Bit of Mmh to Me)" – 5:08

- Czechoslovakian 7" Single (1982)

A. "Follow Me" – 3:55
B. "Hollywood Is Just a Dream When You're Seventeen" – 4:51

- 7" Single (1987)

A. "Follow Me" (New Mix) – 3:49
B. "I'm a Mistery" – 4:35

- 12" Single (1987)

A. "Follow Me" (The Special 1987 Mix) – 7:18
B1. "Follow Me" (Radio Mix) – 3:49
B2. "I'm a Mistery" (Remix) – 5:18

- 12" Single (1998)

A. "Follow Me" – 3:59
B. "Tomorrow" – 3:42

- CD Single (2000)
1. "Follow Me" – 3:50
2. "The Sphinx" – 4:20

== Chart performance ==
=== Weekly charts ===
| Chart (1978) | Peak position |
|---|---|
| Austria (Ö3 Austria Top 40) | 6 |
| Belgium (Ultratop 50 Flanders) | 3 |
| Italy (Musica e dischi) | 9 |
| Netherlands (Dutch Top 40) | 2 |
| Netherlands (Single Top 100) | 3 |
| South Africa (Springbok Radio) | 3 |
| Switzerland (Schweizer Hitparade) | 7 |
| West Germany (GfK) | 3 |

=== Year-end charts ===
| Chart (1978) | Position |
|---|---|
| Austria (Ö3 Austria Top 40) | 11 |
| Belgium (Ultratop 50 Flanders) | 2 |
| Netherlands (Single Top 100) | 28 |
| West Germany (Official German Charts) | 6 |
