= Fabulous (Lover, Love Me) =

Single by Amanda Lear

from the album Diamonds for Breakfast
- B-side: "Oh Boy"
- Released: 1979
- Recorded: 1979
- Genre: Euro disco
- Length: 5:25 (album version); 4:17 (single edit)
- Label: Ariola
- Songwriters: Rainer Pietsch, Amanda Lear
- Producer: Anthony Monn

Amanda Lear singles chronology
"Fashion Pack" (1979)	"Fabulous (Lover, Love Me)" (1979)	"Diamonds" (1979)

"Fabulous (Lover, Love Me)" is a song by French singer Amanda Lear released in 1979 by Ariola Records as the lead single from her album Diamonds for Breakfast.

== Song information ==
The song was composed by Rainer Pietsch and produced by Anthony Monn.

"Fabulous (Lover, Love Me)" was released as the advance single from Amanda's fourth album, Diamonds for Breakfast, in the second half of 1979. The B-side of the single was "Oh Boy", a song about a girl who unluckily falls in love with a gay boy, which would later also be included on Diamonds for Breakfast. Photographs used on the cover were taken by Denis Taranto.

The song was a top 10 success in Sweden, where it remains Lear's highest charting single to date, and a modest hit in Germany. In 1998, the singer re-recorded the song for the Back in Your Arms album, which mostly consisted of new versions of her 1970s hits.

== Track listing ==
- 7" Single

A. "Fabulous (Lover, Love Me)" – 4:17
B. "Oh Boy" – 4:30

== Chart performance ==
Chart (1979)	Peak position
Germany	25
Sweden	8
