= Tomorrow (Amanda Lear song) =

Single by Amanda Lear

from the album I Am a Photograph
- Released: 1977
- Genre: Euro disco
- Length: 4:10
- Label: Ariola
- Songwriters: Rainer Pietsch; Amanda Lear
- Producer: Anthony Monn

Amanda Lear singles chronology
"Blood and Honey" (1976)	"Tomorrow" (1977)	"Blue Tango" (1977)

"Tomorrow" is a song by French singer Amanda Lear, released as the third single in 1977 from her debut album I Am a Photograph, issued in the same year. The song was a hit and remains still today among the Lear's biggest ones.

== Background and composition ==
"(Voulez-vous Rendez-vous) Tomorrow" is an uptempo disco song, written by Rainer Pietsch and by Amanda Lear herself, who provided the lyrics. The single was released by Ariola Records in most countries, by Polydor in Italy, and Nippon Columbia in Japan. The B-side of the 7" single in Italy was "The Lady in Black", and a French language version of "Alphabet" was released in France. "Queen of Chinatown" was the B-side in Spain, Portugal and Brazil, and "Pretty Boys" in Japan. In Poland the song was released in 1978 as a one-sided 7" flexi disc by Tonpress.

Lear promoted "Tomorrow" by numerous TV appearances and the track became one of her biggest hits of the disco era. It reached number 1 of the chart in Italy in October 1977, and remained her trademark hit, not only, but also there.

In 1998, Lear recorded a new version of the song for the album Back in Your Arms which consisted of re-recordings of her old hits. In 2008, she re-recorded "Tomorrow" again, this time in a Salsa-flavoured style, for the album Amour toujours, which in fact was an updated version of her 2006 With Love album.

== Music videos ==
Amanda Lear filmed a number of music videos for "Tomorrow". A blue screen video with two backing dancers was directed by Michael Leckebusch and produced for Musikladen: it can now be found on a 3-DVD box set Das beste aus dem Musikladen Vol. 1, released in 2012. Another clip, produced in 1977 and aired on Italian Rai 2-broadcast television program Odeon. Tutto Quanto fa Spettacolo, sees Lear performing the song in a sport hall, surrounded by young men playing basketball.

Another video was filmed in 1982, also using the blue screen technique, presenting the singer in a golden cage, wearing a tight leopard print catsuit, with huge lipsticks in the background: this clip premiered on 31 December 1982 in Italian Canale 5-broadcast tv program Premiatissima, of whom Amanda Lear herself was the hoster. It was later used in her 1983 Italian Canale 5-broadcast tv program Ma chi è Amanda?.

== Track listing ==
- French 7" Single (1977)

A. "Tomorrow (Voulez-vous un rendez-vous)" – 4:10
B. "Mon alphabet (Prélude en C by J.S. Bach)" – 4:00

- Italian 7" Single (1977)

A. "Tomorrow" – 4:10
B. "The Lady in Black" – 3:30

- Italian 7" Promotional Single (1977)

A. "Tomorrow" – 4:10
B. "Tomorrow" – 4:10

- Spanish 7" Single (1977)

A. "Tomorrow" – 4:10
B. "La reina del barrio chino (Queen of China-Town)" – 4:15

- Japanese 7" Single (1978)

A. "Tomorrow" – 4:10
B. "Pretty Boys" – 2:55

- Polish 7" Flexi Disc (1978)

A. "Tomorrow"

== Charts ==
Chart performance for "Tomorrow"
Chart (1977)	Peak position
Italy (Musica e dischi)	1

== Cover versions ==
Cover of the 1988 CCCP Fedeli alla linea single

- Italian punk rock band CCCP Fedeli alla linea recorded a cover of the song, produced by Mauro Pagani, which was released as "Tomorrow (Voulez-vous un rendez-vous)" by Virgin Records in 1988. Lear contributed guest vocals to the new version as well as the B-side song, "Inch'Allah ça va". Magazine Music & Media described the new version of "Tomorrow" as "a slice of mischievous European pop". A music video for the song was made, which largely consisted of footage of the band performing live accompanied by Lear, set to the studio version of the song. The cover was not included on any of the band's studio albums, and only appeared on their 1994 retrospective double CD Enjoy CCCP, and later on Lear's 2002 compilation DivinAmanda.
- Italian actress and model Eva Robin's recorded a cover of the song for the 2005 album Extreme Metissage, released by the brand L'Inde le Palais.
- Ivan Cattaneo recorded the song for his 2010 album '80-e-basta!.
