= Enigma (Give a Bit of Mmh to Me) =

- Artwork for Dutch vinyl release

Single by Amanda Lear

from the album Sweet Revenge
- Released: 1978
- Genre: Euro disco
- Length: 5:08
- Label: Ariola, Polydor, Nippon Columbia
- Songwriters: Rainer Pietsch, Amanda Lear
- Producer: Anthony Monn

Amanda Lear singles chronology
"Run Baby Run" (1978)	"Enigma (Give a Bit of Mmh to Me)" (1978)	"Gold" (1978)

Music video
- "Enigma (Give a Bit of Mmh to Me)" on YouTube

"Enigma (Give a Bit of Mmh to Me)" is a song by French singer Amanda Lear from her second album Sweet Revenge, released as a single in 1978. It was a chart success upon its original release and enjoyed a resurgence of popularity in 2004 after exposure in the Kinder Bueno TV advertisement.

== Song information ==
The song was composed by Rainer Pietsch, with lyrics written by Amanda Lear, and produced by her longtime collaborator, Anthony Monn. It was released as the single from Lear's second album Sweet Revenge in mid-late 1978, heavily edited from its original album length of 5:08. "Run Baby Run" was released as the B-side in Europe, "Hollywood Flashback" in Africa, and "Gold" in Japan.

"Enigma" met with considerable charts success, reaching the top 10 in Belgium and Italy, and remains one of Lear's biggest hits of the disco era. The singer performed the song on television across Europe as well as in the finale of the erotic Italian documentary film Follie di notte (1978) in which she appeared as the hostess. In 1998, she re-recorded the track for the album Back in Your Arms.

In 2004, the song was featured in the Kinder Bueno chocolate bar TV advertisement which was extensively broadcast in Central and Eastern European countries, such as the Czech Republic, Poland and Romania. It caused a sudden interest in the song and the singer herself. Lear's low-pitched voice caused a stir among TV audiences who initially assumed that the song was performed by a man. "Enigma" received airplay in Eastern Europe and enjoyed newfound popularity in radio charts.

The song was featured in the 2002 exhibition devoted to disco music Disco: A Decade of Saturday Nights at the Museum of Pop Culture in Seattle. The song is also the soundtrack used in the 2024 and 2025 Tails.com dog food advert.

== Music video ==
The music video for the song was filmed as part of Italian TV show Stryx. It pictures Amanda in a bright pink catsuit (same as in the first "Follow Me" video) performing the song on an inflatable bed with three black kittens, surrounded by other Stryx performers. The video was directed by Enzo Trapani and first aired in autumn 1978.

== Track listing ==
- Dutch 7" Single

A. "Enigma (Give a Bit of Mmh to Me)" – 4:00
B. "Run Baby Run" – 3:45

- Italian 7" Single

A. "Enigma (Give a Bit of Mmh to Me)" – 4:20
B. "Run Baby Run" – 3:45

- African 7" Single

A. "Enigma (Give a Bit of Mmh to Me)" – 3:20
B. "Hollywood Flashback" – 4:31

- Japanese 7" Single

A. "Enigma (Give a Bit of Mmh to Me)" – 4:12
B. "Gold" – 3:45

== Chart performance ==
=== Weekly charts ===
Chart (1978)	Peak position
Belgium (Ultratop 50 Flanders)	10
Italy (Musica e dischi)	10
Netherlands (Dutch Top 40)	17
Netherlands (Single Top 100)	11
South Africa (Springbok Radio)	11
Chart (2007)	Peak position
Hungary (MAHASZ)	2

=== Year-end charts ===
Chart (1978)	Peak position
Belgium (Ultratop 50 Flanders)	86

== Cover versions ==
- Lena Valaitis recorded the song in German as "Sag' ganz einfach du zu mir" for her 1979 album Nimm es so wie es kommt.
- Polish model Katarzyna Sowińska performed the song in the second season of Jak oni śpiewają, Polish version of Soapstar Superstar, in September 2007.
