= Gold (Amanda Lear song) =

Single by Amanda Lear

from the album Sweet Revenge
- B-side: "Lily Marlène"
- Released: 1978
- Genre: Euro disco
- Length: 3:45
- Label: Ariola Records
- Songwriters: Charly Ricanek, Amanda Lear
- Producer: Anthony Monn

Amanda Lear singles chronology
"Enigma (Give a Bit of Mmh to Me)" (1978)	"Gold" (1978)	"Lili Marleen" (1978)

"Gold" is a song by French singer Amanda Lear from her second album Sweet Revenge, released as the single in 1978.

== Song information ==
The song was composed by Charly Ricanek, with lyrics written by Amanda Lear, and produced by the singer's longtime collaborator, Anthony Monn. Musically, it showcased the mainstream uptempo disco sound. The track is part of the song suite on the Sweet Revenge album, which tells the story of a girl tempted by the Devil.

"Gold" received a limited single release in late 1978 and was a minor chart success in Belgium and France. The B-side was Lear's cover of the wartime classic "Lili Marleen", which would later be released on her third album, Never Trust a Pretty Face.

In 1989, DJ Ian Levine produced Hi-NRG remixes of "Gold" and "Follow Me". The new versions were released as the double A-side single on both vinyl and CD, and received promotion on TV. The remixed version of "Gold" would later be included on several Amanda Lear hits compilations.

== Track listing ==
- 7" Single (1978)

A. "Gold" – 3:45
B. "Lily Marlène" – 4:45

- 7" Single (1989)

A. "Gold" – 3:50
B. "Follow Me" – 3:41

- 12" Single (1989)

A1. "Gold" (Extended House Mix) – 8:44
A2. "Gold" (Deep Gold Dub Mix) – 6:08
B1. "Follow Me" ('89 High Energy Mix) – 6:28

- CD Maxi-Single (1989)
1. "Gold" – 3:50
2. "Follow Me" – 3:41
3. "Gold" (Extended House Mix) – 8:44
4. "Follow Me" ('89 High Energy Mix) – 3:36

== Chart performance ==
Chart (1978–79)	Peak position
Belgium (Ultratop 50 Flanders)	28
France (IFOP)	37

== Cover versions ==
- Bettina Köster and Jessie Evans released a cover of the song in 2006 under the moniker Autonervous.
