= Stryx =

- Written by: Ennio di Majo
- Directed by: Enzo Trapani
- Starring: Tony Renis; Angelo Branduardi; Amanda Lear; Grace Jones; Patty Pravo; Anna Oxa
- Country of origin: Italy
- Original languages: Italian, English
- No. of seasons: 1
- No. of episodes: 6

Production
- Producers: Alberto Testa, Enzo Trapani, Carla Vistarini
- Running time: 70 minutes

Original release
- Network: Rai 2
- Release: October 15 – November 26, 1978

Stryx is an Italian television series, aired in 1978 on Rai 2.

== Description ==
Stryx thematically referred to Hell, devils and underworld. The scenography featured elements resembling Middle Ages-like gloomy castles and caves.

The show featured acting as well as musical performances from such artists as Amanda Lear, Asha Puthli, Gal Costa, Grace Jones and Patty Pravo. The musical part was divided into a number of smaller parts, with each part featuring a performance from one specific artist, for example Asha Puthli in Indian Stryx, Amanda Lear in Sexy Stryx or Grace Jones in Rumstryx. The show was produced in the disco era, therefore this genre dominates the musical background of Stryx.

The show caused many controversies in more conservative societies, mainly because of its devilish theme and referring to underworld as well as exposing nudity. Due to numerous protests, the show was taken off the broadcast and the production of following episodes was cancelled. In addition to six released episodes, there is an unreleased seventh one that has never been officially aired on television.

== Personnel ==
=== Cast ===
- Amanda Lear - Sexy Stryx
- Anna Oxa - Stereo Stryx
- Asha Puthli- Indian Stryx
- Corrado Lojacono
- Gal Costa - Stryx do Brasil
- Gianni Cajfa
- Grace Jones - Rumstryx
- Hal Yamanduchi
- Mia Martini - Gipsy Stryx
- Luis Agudo
- Ombretta Colli - Ludmilla
- Patty Pravo - Subliminal Stryx
- Tony Renis - Philoconduttore
- Walter Valdi

=== Production ===
- Enzo Trapani - director
- Ennio di Majo - script
- Gianna Sgarbossa - costumes
- Tony De Vita - music
- Renato Greco - choreography
- Enzo Torroni - lighting
