= I Am a Photograph =

Studio album by Amanda Lear
- Released: 1977
- Recorded: 1975–1977
- Studio: Ariola & Arco Studios (Munich, Germany)
- Genre: Euro disco
- Length: 38:20 (Original edition)
- Language: English, French
- Label: Ariola
- Producer: Anthony Monn

Amanda Lear chronology
I Am a Photograph (1977)	Sweet Revenge (1978)

Alternative covers
- Second edition

Alternative cover
- French and Italian editions

Professional ratings
Review scores
Source	Rating
AllMusic	4/5 stars
Billboard	positive
Cash Box	positive
Music Story	4/5 stars

I Am a Photograph is the debut studio album by French singer Amanda Lear, released in 1977 by West German label Ariola Records. The album was a success on the European market and spawned Lear's first disco hit singles "Blood and Honey", "Tomorrow" and "Queen of Chinatown", the latter available only on the album's re-issue. I Am a Photograph was officially re-released on CD in 2012.

== Background ==
Amanda Lear's first album, called I Am a Photograph in reference to her former modelling career, was recorded in Munich with a German producer Anthony Monn, and consisted of mainstream disco material, with majority of lyrics written by Amanda Lear herself. In addition to original songs composed by Anthony Monn and Rainer Pietsch, the album included a number of covers: Nancy Sinatra's "These Boots Are Made for Walkin'", "Blue Tango", paired with Lear's self-penned lyrics and a French-language version of Elvis Presley's "Trouble". In addition, "Alphabet" largely incorporated excerpts from Johann Sebastian Bach's The Well-Tempered Clavier.

The artwork is credited to Ariola-Eurodisc Studios. The front cover of the first pressing pictures a photograph of Amanda Lear taken from the Bravo magazine and stuck on a wooden garage door, between various photographs of motorcycles, a mirror, a crucifix as well as the American, Swedish and Dutch flags. The second pressing featured a cropped nude picture of Amanda Lear, taken by Christa Peters for the Playboy magazine. German editions came with the full-size poster of the topless cover picture. French and Italian pressings of the album used an alternative photograph from the Playboy shoot on the cover.

The cover of Presley's "Trouble" was released as Lear's debut single in 1975. The French-language version of the song, "La Bagarre", met with a modest success in Germany in 1976, followed by "Blood and Honey" later the same year, which met with a major commercial success and was an international breakthrough for Lear in 1977. "Tomorrow" subsequently became a number 1 single in Italy and a trademark hit. "Blue Tango" and "Alphabet" were released in certain territories but did not chart. Later in 1977, "Queen of Chinatown" was released as a single from the second edition of the album, becoming a hit in Europe and Lear's greatest chart success up to that point.

The album's promotional campaign was based on Amanda's "scandalous sex-symbol personality", surrounded by gossip regarding her alleged transsexualism, place of birth, which at the time was believed to be Transylvania, and her relationships with Salvador Dalí and David Bowie. A small concert tour was also arranged in Italy. It became a commercial success in Europe, especially in Italy, where it reached top 10.

I Am a Photograph was re-issued with alternative track listings and covers. The second West German pressing replaced "La Bagarre" with "She's Got the Devil in Her Eyes", which was an instrumental version of "Blood and Honey". On the following edition, "La Bagarre" was omitted in favour of the new recording, "Queen of Chinatown". American edition included an extended version of "Blood and Honey" while the 1978 East German release featured "Mother, Look What They've Done to Me", a Sweet Revenge album track. The album was released as Tomorrow in Brazil, yet again with re-arranged track listing, and as Pretty Boys in Zimbabwe and South Africa. In Argentina, the album was distributed as Soy una fotografía in 1979. The official CD re-release did not take place until 2012, when Gold Legion released the album in three different versions of the front cover, including the original topless poster in chosen editions. All three editions retained the track listing of the original LP release, adding four bonus tracks, including "Queen of Chinatown". The material has been remastered from original master tapes. In August 2014, the album was officially released on digital music platforms.

The 1978 Billboard review praised the album's "catchy" melodies and lyrics, and described Amanda's vocal delivery as "unique" and "intriguing". Contemporary music critic Michael Freedberg gave I Am a Photograph a four-star rating on AllMusic, praising its arrangements and calling it "an album not to be missed". However, John C. Hughes of Popdose.com referred to the album as "nearly unlistenable", critically reflecting on Amanda's vocal performance.

== Commercial performance ==
In 1978 Amanda Lear received a gold disc for cumulative sales of one million units in Italy of the singles "Tomorrow" and "Queen of China Town" and the album "I am a Photograph".

== Track listing ==
=== Original release ===
Side A

1. "Blood and Honey" (Anthony Monn, Amanda Lear) – 4:50
2. "Alphabet (Prelude in C by J. S. Bach)" (Johann Sebastian Bach, Charly Ricanek, Anthony Monn, Amanda Lear) – 4:00
3. "These Boots Are Made for Walkin'" (Lee Hazlewood) – 3:18
4. "Tomorrow" (Rainer Pietsch, Amanda Lear) – 4:10
5. "Pretty Boys" (Anthony Monn, Amanda Lear) – 2:55

Side B

1. "Alligator" (Rainer Pietsch, Amanda Lear) – 4:35
2. "The Lady in Black" (Anthony Monn, Amanda Lear) – 3:30
3. "I Am a Photograph" (Anthony Monn, Amanda Lear) – 4:25
4. "La Bagarre" (Jerry Leiber, Mike Stoller) – 3:27
5. "Blue Tango" (Leroy Anderson, Amanda Lear) – 2:40

=== Second German edition ===
Side A

1. "Blood and Honey" (Anthony Monn, Amanda Lear) – 4:50
2. "Alphabet (Prelude in C by J. S. Bach)" (Johann Sebastian Bach, Charly Ricanek, Anthony Monn, Amanda Lear) – 4:00
3. "These Boots Are Made for Walkin'" (Lee Hazlewood) – 3:18
4. "Tomorrow" (Rainer Pietsch, Amanda Lear) – 4:10
5. "Pretty Boys" (Anthony Monn, Amanda Lear) – 2:55

Side B

1. "Alligator" (Rainer Pietsch, Amanda Lear) – 4:35
2. "The Lady in Black" (Anthony Monn, Amanda Lear) – 3:30
3. "I Am a Photograph" (Anthony Monn, Amanda Lear) – 4:25
4. "She's Got the Devil in Her Eyes" (Anthony Monn, Amanda Lear) – 3:05
5. "Blue Tango" (Leroy Anderson, Amanda Lear) – 2:40

=== Third German edition ===
Side A

1. "Blood and Honey" (Anthony Monn, Amanda Lear) – 4:50
2. "Alphabet (Prelude in C by J. S. Bach)" (Johann Sebastian Bach, Charly Ricanek, Anthony Monn, Amanda Lear) – 4:00
3. "These Boots Are Made for Walkin'" (Lee Hazlewood) – 3:18
4. "Tomorrow" (Rainer Pietsch, Amanda Lear) – 4:10
5. "Pretty Boys" (Anthony Monn, Amanda Lear) – 2:55

Side B

1. "Queen of China-Town" (Anthony Monn, Amanda Lear) – 4:15
2. "Alligator" (Rainer Pietsch, Amanda Lear) – 4:35
3. "The Lady in Black" (Anthony Monn, Amanda Lear) – 3:30
4. "I Am a Photograph" (Anthony Monn, Amanda Lear) – 4:25
5. "Blue Tango" (Leroy Anderson, Amanda Lear) – 2:40

=== American edition ===
Side A

1. "Blood and Honey" (Anthony Monn, Amanda Lear) – 7:14
2. "Alphabet (Prelude in C by J. S. Bach)" (Johann Sebastian Bach, Charly Ricanek, Anthony Monn, Amanda Lear) – 3:58
3. "These Boots Are Made for Walkin'" (Lee Hazlewood) – 3:18
4. "Tomorrow" (Rainer Pietsch, Amanda Lear) – 4:10
5. "Pretty Boys" (Anthony Monn, Amanda Lear) – 2:54

Side B

1. "Queen of China-Town" (Anthony Monn, Amanda Lear) – 4:15
2. "Alligator" (Rainer Pietsch, Amanda Lear) – 4:31
3. "The Lady in Black" (Anthony Monn, Amanda Lear) – 3:38
4. "I Am a Photograph" (Anthony Monn, Amanda Lear) – 4:24
5. "Blue Tango" (Leroy Anderson, Amanda Lear) – 2:44

=== East German edition ===
Side A

1. "Blood and Honey" (Anthony Monn, Amanda Lear) – 4:50
2. "Alphabet (Prelude in C by J. S. Bach)" (Johann Sebastian Bach, Charly Ricanek, Anthony Monn, Amanda Lear) – 4:00
3. "These Boots Are Made for Walkin'" (Lee Hazlewood) – 3:18
4. "Tomorrow" (Rainer Pietsch, Amanda Lear) – 4:10
5. "Pretty Boys" (Anthony Monn, Amanda Lear) – 2:55

Side B

1. "Mother, Look What They've Done to Me" (Anthony Monn, Amanda Lear) – 4:25
2. "Alligator" (Rainer Pietsch, Amanda Lear) – 4:35
3. "The Lady in Black" (Anthony Monn, Amanda Lear) – 3:30
4. "I Am a Photograph" (Anthony Monn, Amanda Lear) – 4:25
5. "Blue Tango" (Leroy Anderson, Amanda Lear) – 2:40

=== Brazilian edition ===
Side A

1. "Tomorrow" (Rainer Pietsch, Amanda Lear) – 4:10
2. "Alphabet (Prelude in C by J. S. Bach)" (Johann Sebastian Bach, Charly Ricanek, Anthony Monn, Amanda Lear) – 4:00
3. "These Boots Are Made for Walkin'" (Lee Hazlewood) – 3:18
4. "Blood and Honey" (Anthony Monn, Amanda Lear) – 4:50
5. "Pretty Boys" (Anthony Monn, Amanda Lear) – 2:55

Side B

1. "Queen of China-Town" (Anthony Monn, Amanda Lear) – 4:15
2. "Alligator" (Rainer Pietsch, Amanda Lear) – 4:35
3. "The Lady in Black" (Anthony Monn, Amanda Lear) – 3:30
4. "I Am a Photograph" (Anthony Monn, Amanda Lear) – 4:21
5. "Blue Tango" (Leroy Anderson, Amanda Lear) – 2:40

=== CD re-issue ===
1. "Blood and Honey" (Anthony Monn, Amanda Lear) – 4:50
2. "Alphabet (Prelude in C by J. S. Bach)" (Johann Sebastian Bach, Charly Ricanek, Anthony Monn, Amanda Lear) – 3:56
3. "These Boots Are Made for Walkin'" (Lee Hazlewood) – 3:18
4. "Tomorrow" (Rainer Pietsch, Amanda Lear) – 4:10
5. "Pretty Boys" (Anthony Monn, Amanda Lear) – 2:55
6. "Alligator" (Rainer Pietsch, Amanda Lear) – 4:35
7. "The Lady in Black" (Anthony Monn, Amanda Lear) – 3:36
8. "I Am a Photograph" (Anthony Monn, Amanda Lear) – 4:25
9. "La Bagarre" (Jerry Leiber, Mike Stoller) – 3:27
10. "Blue Tango" (Leroy Anderson, Amanda Lear) – 2:43
11. "Queen of Chinatown" (Anthony Monn, Amanda Lear) – 4:15
12. "Blood and Honey" (12" Version) (Anthony Monn, Amanda Lear) – 8:55
13. "She's Got the Devil in Her Eyes" (Anthony Monn, Amanda Lear) – 3:05
14. "Lethal Leading Lady" (Amanda Lear, La Bionda, Malachy) – 2:52

== Personnel ==
- Amanda Lear – lead vocals
- Bavarian Strings – strings
- Mats Björklund – guitar
- Hermann Breuer – horns
- Harold Faltermeyer – keyboards, Moog synthesizer
- Rudi Fuessers – horns
- Lee Harper – horns
- Martin Harrison – drums
- Howard Katz – horns
- Peter Lüdermann – sound engineer
- Renate Maurer – backing vocals
- Anthony Monn – record producer, musical arranger
- Paul Niezgoda – horns
- Charly Ricanek – musical arranger (tracks: A1, A2, A5, B1, B4), keyboards
- Claudia Schwarz – backing vocals
- Giuseppe Solera – horns
- Pit Troja – percussion
- Gary Unwin – bass guitar
- Gitta Walther – backing vocals

== Charts ==
Chart performance for I Am a Photograph
Chart (1977–78)	Peak position
Austrian Albums (Ö3 Austria)	25
German Albums (Offizielle Top 100)	26
Italian Albums (Musica e dischi)	7

== Release history ==
Date	Region	Format(s)	Label
1977	West Germany	LP, cassette	Ariola Records
1977	France	LP	Ariola Records
1977	Italy	LP	Polydor Records
1977	Portugal	LP	Phonogram Records
1977	Greece	LP	Epic Records
1977	Yugoslavia	LP	PGP-RTB
1977	USA	LP	Chrysalis Records
1978	East Germany	LP	Ariola Records
1978	Spain	LP	Ariola Records
1978	Zimbabwe	LP	Ariola Records
1978	South Africa	LP	Ariola Records
1978	Japan	LP	Ariola Records
1978	New Zealand	LP	RCA Records
1978	Brazil	LP	RCA Records
1979	Argentina	LP	RCA Records
6 November 2012	USA	CD	Gold Legion
2 August 2013	USA	CD	Gold Legion
4 August 2014	Worldwide	digital	Sony BMG
