= Blood and Honey =

Single by Amanda Lear

from the album I Am a Photograph
- B-side: "She's Got the Devil in Her Eyes"
- Released: December 1976
- Recorded: 1976
- Genre: Euro disco
- Length: 4:45
- Label: Ariola Records
- Songwriters: Anthony Monn, Amanda Lear
- Producer: Anthony Monn

Amanda Lear singles chronology
"La Bagarre" (1975)	"Blood and Honey" (1976)	"Tomorrow" (1977)

"Blood and Honey" is a song performed by French singer Amanda Lear, released as a single in 1976 by Ariola Records and later included on her debut album I Am a Photograph. The song was a chart success in Europe and now remains one of Lear's trademark hits.

== Background ==
The song was composed and produced by Anthony Monn, who would remain Amanda Lear's musical partner for the next five years. The lyrics were written by Amanda Lear herself and were inspired by Salvador Dalí's 1927 painting Honey Is Sweeter Than Blood (La miel es más dulce que la sangre).

"Blood and Honey" was released in December 1976. The B-side of the 7" single was "She's Got the Devil in Her Eyes", in fact an instrumental version of "Blood and Honey" and a line taken from the chorus of the song. On the 12" version, released in the English-speaking countries, an extended, almost 9 minute-long mix of "Blood and Honey" was included. An alternative extended version was released in the USA and received a positive review from Billboard.

Amanda Lear promoted the song by numerous TV performances, among others Discoring in Italy. The single was met with a chart success in 1977, becoming Lear's first notable hit and one of her most popular songs of the disco era. The song was then included as the opening track on her debut album I Am a Photograph.

In 1998 the song was re-recorded for the album Back in Your Arms. The original song was subsequently remixed and released on a single to promote the compilation Amanda '98 – Follow Me Back in My Arms, in fact a re-worked edition of Back in Your Arms. In the same year, the 7" single cover picture was used on the cover of The Collection album. In 2000, the song inspired the title of the compilation Made of Blood & Honey.

== Music video ==
Amanda Lear shot a music video for "Blood and Honey" for a German TV show Musikladen. It pictures the singer dancing and performing the title song against a big painting. Two backup dancers accompany her, with their faces painted white. The music video was released on a 3-DVD box set Das beste aus dem Musikladen Vol. 1 in 2012, together with ten other videos that Lear made for Musikladen.

== Track listing ==
- 7" Single (1976)

A. "Blood and Honey" – 4:45
B. "She's Got the Devil in Her Eyes" – 3:05

- UK 7" Single (1977)

A. "Blood and Honey" – 3:10
B. "Blood and Honey" – 4:50

- UK/Australian 12" Single (1977)

A. "Blood and Honey" – 8:58
B. "Blood and Honey" – 4:50

- Canadian 12" Single (1977)

A. "Blood and Honey" – 8:58
B. "She's Got the Devil in Her Eyes" – 3:05

- US 12" Single (1977)

A. "Blood and Honey" – 7:14
B. "Blood and Honey" – 7:14

- CD Maxi-Single (1998)
1. "Blood and Honey" (New Remix Version) – 3:59
2. "Blood and Honey" (Club Mix) – 4:21
3. "Rien ne va plus" – 3:41

== Chart performance ==
=== Weekly charts ===
Weekly chart performance for "Blood and Honey"
Chart (1977)	Peak position
Italy (Musica e dischi)	11
West Germany (GfK)	12

=== Year-end charts ===
1977 year-end chart performance for "Blood and Honey"
Chart (1977)	Peak position
West Germany (Official German Charts)	36

== Cover versions ==
- German artist Fancy covered the song on his 1985 album Get Your Kicks.
