= Sweet Revenge (Amanda Lear album) =

Studio album by Amanda Lear
- Released: 1978
- Recorded: December 1977–February 1978
- Studio: Arco Studios, Trixi Studios, Ariola Studios (Munich, Germany); Sound Studio "N" (Cologne, Germany)
- Genre: Euro disco
- Length: 35:30
- Language: English
- Label: Ariola
- Producer: Anthony Monn

Amanda Lear chronology
I Am a Photograph (1977)	Sweet Revenge (1978)	Never Trust a Pretty Face (1979)

Professional ratings
Review scores
Source	Rating
AllMusic	4/5 stars
Billboard	positive
Cash Box	positive

Sweet Revenge is the second studio album by French singer Amanda Lear, released in 1978 by West German label Ariola Records. The album turned out to be a major commercial success, spawning European hit disco singles "Follow Me" and "Enigma (Give a Bit of Mmh to Me)". Sweet Revenge remains Lear's best-selling album. It was released in CD format in 1992.

== Background ==
After the major success of the debut album, Lear teamed up again with Anthony Monn to work on her second LP. Sweet Revenge was recorded between December 1977 and February 1978 between various studios in Munich, and consisted of mainstream disco material, with all lyrics written by Lear. The album incorporates elements of cabaret music in "Comics" and rock in "The Stud". All songs from the side A of the original LP release are a lyrically linked non-stop medley, making Sweet Revenge a concept album. The songs tell the story of "a girl who sold her soul to the Devil and won", as Amanda explained in the liner notes. The girl surrenders to the Devil's temptation, who promises her fame and fortune, but eventually runs away and finds real love with a man, which is her "sweet revenge over the Devil's offer". In a 1997 interview, Lear considered Sweet Revenge the album she is the most proud of.

The album's gatefold cover was designed by Amanda Lear. The pictures, taken by Denis Taranto, reference sadomasochism and present Amanda as a dominatrix, holding a whip. Other images depict Lear channeling Marlene Dietrich, sitting on a barrel, wearing stockings and a top hat, what refers to the image of Dietrich in her iconic 1930 film The Blue Angel. Included are also two pictures of Amanda performing in concert as well as a topless photograph from her Playboy shoot. The album came with a big poster of the front cover image, with lyrics printed on the back.

"Follow Me" was released as the lead single and went on to become a Top 10 hit in many European countries, including No. 3 in Belgium, Germany and the Netherlands. The song now remains Lear's signature tune. "Enigma (Give a Bit of Mmh to Me)" was also met with a commercial success, reaching the Top 10 in certain territories, and "Gold" became a minor hit in Belgium. "Run Baby Run" received a single release, but did not match the chart success of other singles from the album. The 1977 hit single "Queen of Chinatown", previously available on Lear's debut album, was released as a bonus track on Italian editions of Sweet Revenge. In Spain, a cassette version of the album was released as Dulce Venganza (Sweet Revenge).

Sweet Revenge was accompanied by a concert tour, which was bigger and more elaborate than her previous shows. A promotional tournée was also launched in the United States, however, to no success. The publicity campaign again focused around Amanda's scandalous sex symbol image. The album was met with a commercial success, placing in the Top 10 in several European charts, including No. 4 in Germany, her most successful market at that time. It was certified gold in Germany and France, for selling 250,000 and 100,000 copies respectively. It is also her best-selling album to date, with an estimated 4 million copies shifted around the world.

The rights to the Ariola-Eurodisc back catalogue are currently held by Sony BMG Music Entertainment. Sweet Revenge was re-released on CD in 1992, excluding much of the visual content of the original double cover and syncing all songs from the side A into one CD track. For two decades, Sweet Revenge remained the only original Ariola album by Amanda Lear to have been re-released on compact disc worldwide, until her debut LP, I Am a Photograph, received a CD re-release in 2012 and 2013.

== Track listings ==
=== Original LP release ===
Side A

1. "Follow Me" (Anthony Monn, Amanda Lear) – 3:50
2. "Gold" (Charly Ricanek, Amanda Lear) – 3:45
3. "Mother, Look What They've Done to Me" (Anthony Monn, Amanda Lear) – 4:32
4. "Run Baby Run" (Anthony Monn, Amanda Lear) – 3:45
5. "Follow Me (Reprise)" (Anthony Monn, Amanda Lear) – 3:40

Side B

1. "Comics" (Charly Ricanek, Amanda Lear) – 3:40
2. "Enigma (Give a Bit of Mmh to Me)" (Rainer Pietsch, Amanda Lear) – 5:08
3. "The Stud" (Rainer Pietsch, Amanda Lear) – 4:02
4. "Hollywood Flashback" (Anthony Monn, Amanda Lear) – 4:31

=== Italian edition ===
Side A

1. "Follow Me" (Anthony Monn, Amanda Lear) – 3:50
2. "Gold" (Charly Ricanek, Amanda Lear) – 3:45
3. "Mother, Look What They've Done to Me" (Anthony Monn, Amanda Lear) – 4:32
4. "Run Baby Run" (Anthony Monn, Amanda Lear) – 3:45
5. "Follow Me (Reprise)" (Anthony Monn, Amanda Lear) – 3:40

Side B

1. "Comics" (Charly Ricanek, Amanda Lear) – 3:40
2. "Enigma (Give a Bit of Mmh to Me)" (Rainer Pietsch, Amanda Lear) – 5:08
3. "The Stud" (Rainer Pietsch, Amanda Lear) – 4:02
4. "Hollywood Flashback" (Anthony Monn, Amanda Lear) – 4:31
5. "Queen of Chinatown" (Rainer Pietsch, Amanda Lear) – 4:15

=== Spanish cassette edition ===
Side A

1. "Sigueme (Follow Me)" (Anthony Monn, Amanda Lear)
2. "Gold" (Charly Ricanek, Amanda Lear)
3. "Mother, Look What They've Done to Me" (Anthony Monn, Amanda Lear)
4. "Run Baby Run" (Anthony Monn, Amanda Lear)
5. "Follow Me (Reprise)" (Anthony Monn, Amanda Lear)

Side B

1. "Comics" (Charly Ricanek, Amanda Lear)
2. "Enigma (Give a Bit of Mmh to Me)" (Rainer Pietsch, Amanda Lear)
3. "The Stud" (Rainer Pietsch, Amanda Lear)
4. "Hollywood Flashback" (Anthony Monn, Amanda Lear)
5. "Comics (Reprise)" (Charly Ricanek, Amanda Lear)

=== CD edition ===
1. "Follow Me"/"Gold"/"Mother, Look What They've Done to Me"/"Run Baby Run"/"Follow Me (Reprise)" (Anthony Monn, Charly Ricanek, Amanda Lear) – 19:44
2. "Comics" (Charly Ricanek, Amanda Lear) – 3:40
3. "Enigma (Give a Bit of Mmh to Me)" (Rainer Pietsch, Amanda Lear) – 5:08
4. "The Stud" (Rainer Pietsch, Amanda Lear) – 4:02
5. "Hollywood Flashback" (Anthony Monn, Amanda Lear) – 4:33

== Personnel ==
- Amanda Lear – lead vocals
- Mats Björklund – guitar
- Wolfgang Emperhoff – backing vocals
- Martin Harrison – drums
- Herbert Ihle – backing vocals
- Dave King – bass guitar
- Peter Lüdemann – engineer
- Renate Mauerer – backing vocals
- Anthony Monn – record producer, programming
- Rainer Pietsch – arranger
- Edith Prock – backing vocals
- Charly Ricanek – arranger, keyboards
- Kristian Schultze – synthesizer
- Claudia Schwarz – backing vocals
- Denis Taranto – photography
- Gary Unwin – bass guitar

== Chart performance ==
=== Weekly charts ===
Chart (1978)	Peak position
Australian Albums (Kent Music Report)	50
Austrian Albums (Ö3 Austria)	8
Dutch Albums (Album Top 100)	9
French Albums (Europe 1)	10
German Albums (Offizielle Top 100)	4
Italian Albums (Musica e dischi)	9

=== Year-end charts ===
Chart (1978)	Position
Austrian Albums (Ö3 Austria)	14
German Albums (Offizielle Top 100)	15
Dutch Albums (Album Top 100)	30

== Certifications and sales ==
Region	Certification	Certified units/sales
Germany (BVMI)	Gold	250,000^{^}
^{^} Shipments figures based on certification alone.

== Release history ==
Year	Region	Format(s)	Label
1978	Germany	LP, cassette	Ariola Records
1978	Spain	LP, cassette	Ariola Records
1978	Austria	LP	Ariola Records
1978	Benelux	LP	Ariola Records
1978	United Kingdom	LP	Ariola Records
1978	France	LP	Eurodisc
1978	Italy	LP	Polydor Records
1978	Portugal	LP	PolyGram
1978	Yugoslavia	LP	PGP-RTB
1978	Greece	LP	Epic Records
1978	Canada	LP	Epic Records
1978	United States	LP	Chrysalis Records
1978	Australia	LP	RCA Records
1980	Venezuela	LP	Ariola Records
1992	Germany	CD	BMG Ariola
23 October 2017	Italy	Picture disc	Sony Music, RCA Records
