= Queen of Chinatown =

Single by Amanda Lear

from the album I Am a Photograph
- B-side: "My Alphabet", "The Lady in Black"
- Released: 1977
- Genre: Euro disco
- Length: 4:15
- Label: Ariola Records
- Songwriters: Anthony Monn, Amanda Lear
- Producer: Anthony Monn

Amanda Lear singles chronology
| "Alphabet" (1977) | "Queen of Chinatown" (1977) | "Follow Me" (1978) |

Audio sample
- 22-second sample from Amanda Lear's Queen of Chinatown: file; help

"Queen of Chinatown" (also typed "Queen of China-Town") is a song by French singer Amanda Lear, released in 1977 by Ariola Records. It found chart success and remains one of Lear's biggest hits. The song's lyrics were written by Lear and the music was composed by Anthony Monn, her musical partner at that time. The song is an uptempo disco composition with characteristic oriental elements. It was released in late 1977 as the sixth and final single from Lear's debut album, I Am a Photograph (1977), though was only included on the album's re-issue, replacing "La Bagarre". The B-side of the single was "Alphabet", which had earlier received a separate A-side single release in the Netherlands. In Japan, "The Lady in Black" was released on the side B.

== Release ==
"Queen of Chinatown" was heavily promoted by numerous TV performances in 1977 and 1978. The song became Lear's biggest hit up to that point and now remains one of her most memorable songs. It reached number two in West Germany, which is her highest chart achievement in that country to date, and number two in Italy, where it was kept off the top spot for four consecutive weeks in February 1978 by Matia Bazar's singles "Solo tu" and "...e dirsi ciao".

The song was recorded again in 1998 for the Back in Your Arms album. Minor label Mag Music released that re-recording as a promotional only 12" vinyl single with four mixes in the summer of 1999. Hungarian DJ Sterbinszky released a remix of "Queen of Chinatown" in 2005, using a sample from the original recording. The track reached number five on the Hungarian singles chart. In the same year, German producer DJenetix remixed the track for the various artists compilation Disco Celebration which consisted of contemporary remixes of the hits from the 70s and 80s. The new version was released as a single in 2006. In 2008, Amanda recorded another version of the song for her Amour toujours album, in fact a re-release of the 2006 album With Love.

== Music videos ==
A music video was filmed for the song, for German TV show Musikladen. It presents the singer wearing an oriental dress and holding a hand fan, performing the song with two backup dancers. This music video was released on a 3-DVD box set Das beste aus dem Musikladen Vol. 1 in 2012, together with ten other videos that Lear had made for the show. Another video was filmed for Italian prime time TV show Premiatissima, hosted by Lear in 1982. This video was later used in her television special Ma chi è Amanda?, aired in Italy in February 1983.

== Track listings ==
- 7" single (1977)

A. "Queen of China-Town" – 4:15
B. "My Alphabet" – 4:00

- Japanese 7" single (1978)

A. "Queen of China-Town" – 4:15
B. "The Lady in Black" – 3:30

- Italian 12" promotional single (1998)

A1. "Queen of Chinatown" (Paramour Radio Vox) – 4:22
A2. "Queen of Chinatown" (Paramour Summer Mix) – 8:23
B1. "Queen of Chinatown" (Super Eel Cool Gran Manzana) – 7:25
B2. "Queen of Chinatown" (Blow Appella) – 7:00

- CD maxi-single feat. DJenetix (2006)
1. "Queen of Chinatown 2006" (Single Version) – 3:53
2. "Queen of Chinatown 2006" (Club Remix) – 4:54
3. "Queen of Chinatown 2006" (Extended Mix) – 5:43

== Charts ==
=== Weekly charts ===
| Chart (1977–78) | Peak position |
|---|---|
| Austria (Ö3 Austria Top 40) | 11 |
| Finland (Suomen virallinen lista) | 18 |
| Italy (Musica e dischi) | 2 |
| Switzerland (Schweizer Hitparade) | 5 |
| West Germany (GfK Entertainment Charts) | 2 |

=== Year-end charts ===
| Chart (1977–78) | Peak position |
|---|---|
| Italy | 19 |
| West Germany | 39 |
