= Anthony Monn =

- Born: March 17, 1944 (age 82); Munich, Germany
- Genres: Rock and roll, Euro disco
- Occupations: Musician, songwriter, singer, record producer

Anthony Monn (also known as Tony Monn, born March 17, 1944) is a German singer, composer, and record producer. During the 1970s he was one half of the duo Marion & Antony.

== Background ==
Monn started his career as a singer in the German schlager genre in the early 1970s. Among his best-known songs from that period are 1975's "Du Gehst Fort", a duet with singer and actress Marion Maerz, "Lucky" (1978), and "Johnny und Mary" (a German-language cover version of Robert Palmer's 1981 hit), although these met limited commercial success in Germany.

Monn instead achieved his greatest international success with French disco queen Amanda Lear, for whom he produced albums I Am a Photograph (1977), Sweet Revenge (1978), Never Trust a Pretty Face (1979) — recorded in Giorgio Moroder's Musicland Studios in Munich — Diamonds for Breakfast (1980), and Incognito (1981). Monn also composed most of Lear's hit singles during this period, including classics like "Blood and Honey", "Follow Me" and "Fashion Pack (Studio 54)". He also produced albums for American singer Judy Cheeks, released on label Salsoul in the U.S. The single "Mellow Lovin'" reached No.10 on the American dance charts in 1978. In the 1980s, he wrote and produced a number of albums and singles for German Euro disco star Fancy, hits for Italian couple Al Bano and Romina Power ("Sempre Sempre" (1986), German synth-pop star Peter Schilling, La Toya Jackson, as well as Saragossa Band ("Big Bamboo", "Agadou", "Zabadak"), and Orlando Riva Sound ("Moon Boots", "Fire on the Water", "Indian Reservation"), the latter a novelty disco band of which both Monn and longtime collaborator Rainer Pietsch were members.

Tony also helped to begin the recording careers of Toby and Jens Gad, when he would let the boys (just teenagers at the time) use his studio when he was away.

== Career ==
Working with producer, Fritz Muschler, Anthony and Marion recorded the song "Du gehst fort". Backed with "Ein Mädchen in Athen", it was released on Ariola 16 222 AT in 1975. It achieved hit status, spending thirteen weeks in the German charts, peaking at no. 15.
