= Söngvakeppnin =

Icelandic Eurovision Song Contest preselection

- Genre: Various
- Location: Iceland
- Years active: 1981–2025
- Founders: Ríkisútvarpið (RÚV)
- Website: Official website

Söngvakeppnin (known from 1986 to 1989 as Söngvakeppni sjónvarpsstöðva and in 1981, 1983, and from 1990 to 2012, as Söngvakeppni sjónvarpsins, lit. 'the Television's Song Contest') is an annual music competition organised by Icelandic public broadcaster Ríkisútvarpið (RÚV) to determine its entry for the Eurovision Song Contest.

== Format ==
The contest was first organised in 1981, although neither it nor its subsequent 1983 edition were used to determine any representatives for the Eurovision Song Contest until Iceland made its debut in the 1986 contest. Since then, RÚV has used Söngvakeppni sjónvarpsins to select the Icelandic entry, but has also used an internal selection at times, between 1995 and 1999, and in 2004, 2005, and 2021.

Söngvakeppni sjónvarpsins has consisted of a multi-artist competition, with between five and ten songs competing. Most contests in the past have been a one-night event. From 2006 to 2025, the contest consisted of a number of semi-finals aired before a final.

It was known for RÚV to change the performers for Eurovision. This can be seen in 1986, when winner Pálmi Gunnarsson was joined by Eiríkur Hauksson and Helga Möller to form ICY for Eurovision. In 1994, RÚV was not happy with the winning song, and so enlisted Frank McNamara to rearrange the entry and select a new singer.

Songs at Söngvakeppni sjónvarpsins were previously only allowed to be performed in Icelandic. However, the winning songs were normally translated into English for Eurovision. This rule was abolished in 2008, when English-language songs were allowed to compete for the first time. The rules were later changed again in 2015, requiring that in the semi-finals, the songs must be performed in Icelandic. In the final, the finalists will be asked to determine the language they will perform their song in Eurovision.

== Winners ==
The winners of Söngvakeppnin since 1986 have gone on to represent Iceland at the Eurovision Song Contest. Iceland has never won the contest, being the only Nordic country never to do so, but it has finished second twice: in 1999 (when an internal selection was used), losing to Sweden, and in 2009, when it lost to Norway.

2020 was the first time in history where the winner of Söngvakeppnin, in this case Daði og Gagnamagnið, did not advance to Eurovision, as that event was cancelled due to the COVID-19 pandemic. Instead, RÚV internally re-selected Daði og Gagnamagnið to represent the country in 2021, with the song also chosen internally. The competition will not be held in 2026 due to RÚV's decision not to take part in that year's Eurovision.

Table key
1	First place
2	Second place
3	Third place
◁	Last place
†	Upcoming event

List of Söngvakeppnin winners
Year	Artist	Song	Songwriter(s)	At Eurovision			
Year	Artist	Song	Songwriter(s)	Final	Points	Semi	Points
1981	Pálmi Gunnarsson	"Af litlum neista"	Guðmundur Ingólfsson, Magnús Haraldsson	Did not compete (Note: Iceland did not compete in Eurovision until 1986.)			
1983	Sigríður Gröndal	—N/a (Note: The contest was a classical singing competition.)		Did not compete			
1986	Pálmi Gunnarsson	"Gleðibankinn"	Magnús Eiríksson	16th (Note: Competed as ICY.)	19	No semi-finals	
1987	Halla Margrét Árnadóttir	"Hægt og hljótt"	Valgeir Guðjónsson	16th	28	No semi-finals	
1988	Sverrir Stormsker and Stefán Hilmarsson	"Þú og þeir (Sókrates)"	Sverrir Stormsker	16th (Note: Competed as Beathoven.)	20	No semi-finals	
1989	Daníel Ágúst Haraldsson	"Það sem enginn sér"	Valgeir Guðjónsson	22nd ◁	0	No semi-finals	
1990	Sigríður Beinteinsdóttir and Grétar Örvarsson	"Eitt lag enn"	Aðalsteinn Ásberg Sigurðsson, Hörður G. Ólafsson	4th (Note: Competed as Stjórnin.)	124	No semi-finals	
1991	Stefán Hilmarsson and Eyjólfur Kristjánsson	"Draumur um Nínu"	Eyjólfur Kristjánsson	15th (Note: Competed with the song "Nína" as Stefán and Eyfi.)	26	No semi-finals	
1992	Sigríður Beinteinsdóttir and Sigrún Eva Ármannsdottir	"Nei eða já"	Friðrik Karlsson, Grétar Örvarsson, Stefán Hilmarsson	7th (Note: Competed as Heart 2 Heart.)	80	No semi-finals	
1993	Ingibjörg Stefánsdóttir	"Þá veistu svarið"	Friðrik Sturluson, Jon Kjell Seljeseth	13th (Note: Competed as Inga.)	42	Kvalifikacija za Millstreet	
1994	Sigrún Eva Ármannsdóttir	"Nætur"	Friðrik Karlsson, Stefán Hilmarsson	12th (Note: The song was performed by Sigga.)	49	No semi-finals	
2000	Einar Ágúst Víðisson and Telma Ágústsdóttir	"Hvert sem er"	Örlygur Smári, Sigurður Örn Jónsson	12th (Note: Competed with the song "Tell Me!" as August and Telma.)	45	No semi-finals	
2001	Kristján Gíslason and Gunnar Ólason	"Birta"	Einar Bárðarson, Magnús Þór Sigmundsson	22nd (Note: Competed with the song "Angel" as Two Tricky.) ◁	3	No semi-finals	
2003	Birgitta Haukdal	"Segðu mér allt"	Birgitta Haukdal Brynjarsdóttir, Hallgrímur Óskarsson	8th (Note: Competed with the song "Open Your Heart".)	81	No semi-finals	
2006	Silvía Nótt	"Til hamingju Ísland"	Ágústa Eva Erlendsdóttir, Þorvaldur Bjarni Þorvaldsson	Failed to qualify		13th (Note: Competed with the song "Congratulations" as Silvia Night.)	62
2007	Eiríkur Hauksson	"Ég les í lófa þínum"	Kristján Hreinsson, Sveinn Rúnar Sigurðsson	Failed to qualify		13th (Note: Competed with the song "Valentine Lost".)	77
2008	Eurobandið	"This Is My Life"	Örlygur Smári, Páll Óskar Hjálmtýsson, Peter Fenner	14th	64	8th	68
2009	Jóhanna Guðrún Jónsdóttir	"Is It True?"	Chris Neil, Óskar Páll Sveinsson, Tinatin Japaridze	2nd (Note: Competed as Yohanna.)	218	1st	174
2010	Hera Björk	"Je ne sais quoi"	Hera Björk Þórhallsdóttir, Örlygur Smári	19th	41	3rd	123
2011	Sigurjón's Friends	"Aftur heim"	Sigurjón Brink, Þórunn Erna Clausen	20th (Note: Competed with the song "Coming Home" as Sjonni's Friends.)	61	4th	100
2012	Greta Salóme and Jónsi	"Mundu eftir mér"	Greta Salóme Stefánsdóttir	20th (Note: Competed with the song "Never Forget".)	46	8th	75
2013	Eyþór Ingi Gunnlaugsson	"Ég á líf"	Örlygur Smári, Pétur Örn Guðmundsson	17th (Note: Competed as Eythor Ingi.)	47	6th	72
2014	Pollapönk	"No Prejudice"	John William Grant, Haraldur F. Gíslason, Heiðar Örn Kristjánsson	15th	58	8th	61
2015	María Ólafsdóttir	"Unbroken"	Ásgeir Orri Ásgeirsson, Pálmi Ragnar Ásgeirsson, Sæþór Kristjánsson	Failed to qualify		15th (Note: Competed as Maria Olafs.)	14
2016	Greta Salóme	"Hear Them Calling"	Greta Salóme Stefánsdóttir	Failed to qualify		14th	51
2017	Svala	"Paper"	Einar Egilsson, Lester Mendez, Lily Elise, Svala Björgvinsdóttir	Failed to qualify		15th	60
2018	Ari Ólafsson	"Our Choice"	Þórunn Erna Clausen	Failed to qualify		19th ◁	15
2019	Hatari	"Hatrið mun sigra"	Einar Hrafn Stefánsson, Klemens Nikulásson Hannigan, Matthías Tryggvi Haraldsson	10th	232	3rd	221
2020	Daði og Gagnamagnið	"Think About Things"	Daði Freyr Pétursson	Contest cancelled (Note: The 2020 contest was cancelled due to the COVID-19 pandemic.)			
2022	Sigga, Beta and Elin	"Með hækkandi sól"	Lovísa Elísabet Sigrúnardóttir	23rd (Note: Competed as Systur.)	20	10th	103
2023	Diljá	"Power"	Diljá Pétursdóttir, Pálmi Ragnar Ásgeirsson	Failed to qualify		11th	44
2024	Hera Björk	"Scared of Heights"	Ásdís María Viðarsdóttir, Ferras Alqaisi, Jaro Omar, Michael Burek	Failed to qualify		15th ◁	3
2025	Væb	"Róa"	Matthías Davíð Matthíasson, Hálfdán Helgi Matthíasson, Ingi Þór Garðarsson	25th	33	6th	97

=== Performers and songwriters with multiple wins ===
The following individuals have won Söngvakeppnin as a performer or songwriter more than once.

Individuals with multiple Söngvakeppnin wins
Wins	Name	Wins as performer	Wins as songwriter
4	Stefán Hilmarsson	1988, 1991	1992, 1994
4	Örlygur Smári	—N/a	2000, 2008, 2010, 2013
2	Greta Salóme Stefánsdóttir	2012 (with Jónsi), 2016	
2	Hera Björk	2010, 2024	2010
2	Gunnar Ólason	2001, 2011 (as part of Sigurjón's Friends)	—N/a
2	Pálmi Gunnarsson	1981, 1986	—N/a
2	Sigríður Beinteinsdóttir	1990, 1992	—N/a
2	Sigrún Eva Ármannsdottir	1992, 1994	—N/a
2	Friðrik Karlsson	—N/a	1992, 1994
2	Pálmi Ragnar Ásgeirsson	—N/a	2015, 2023
2	Þórunn Erna Clausen	—N/a	2011, 2018
2	Valgeir Guðjónsson	—N/a	1987, 1989

== Söngvakeppnin Hall of Fame ==
Heiðurshöll Söngvakeppninnar or the Söngvakeppnin Hall of Fame was introduced in 2024 to acknowledge artists who have outstanding contributions to the competition.

Year	Artist	Ref.
2024	Sigríður Beinteinsdóttir	
2024	Björgvin Halldórsson	
2025	Jóhanna Guðrún	

== See also ==
- Dansk Melodi Grand Prix
- Melodifestivalen
- Melodi Grand Prix
- Uuden Musiikin Kilpailu
- Iceland in the Eurovision Song Contest
