= Iceland in the Eurovision Song Contest 2006 =

- Eurovision Song Contest 2006
- Participating broadcaster: Ríkisútvarpið (RÚV)
- Country: Iceland
- Selection process: Söngvakeppni Sjónvarpsins 2006
- Selection date: 18 February 2006

Competing entry
- Song: "Congratulations"
- Artist: Silvía Night
- Songwriters: Þorvaldur Bjarni Þorvaldsson; Ágústa Eva Erlendsdóttir; Gaukur Úlfarsson

Placement
- Semi-final result: Failed to qualify (13th)

Participation chronology

Iceland was represented at the Eurovision Song Contest 2006 with the song "Congratulations", written by Þorvaldur Bjarni Þorvaldsson, Ágústa Eva Erlendsdóttir, and Gaukur Úlfarsson, and performed by Erlendsdóttir herself under her satirical character Silvía Night. The Icelandic participating broadcaster, Ríkisútvarpið (RÚV), selected its entry through Söngvakeppni Sjónvarpsins 2006. The selection consisted of three semi-finals and a final, held on 21 January, 28 January, 4 February and 18 February 2006, respectively. Eight songs competed in each semi-final with the top four as selected by a public televote alongside two jury wildcards advancing to the final. In the final, "Til hamingju Ísland" performed by Silvía Nótt emerged as the winner exclusively through public televoting. The song was later translated from Icelandic to English for the Eurovision Song Contest and was titled "Congratulations", while her stage name was changed to Silvía Night.

Iceland competed in the semi-final of the Eurovision Song Contest which took place on 18 May 2006. Performing as the closing entry during the show in position 23, "Congratulations" was not announced among the top 10 entries of the semi-final and therefore did not qualify to compete in the final. It was later revealed that Iceland placed thirteenth out of the 23 participating countries in the semi-final with 62 points.

== Background ==
Prior to the 2006 Contest, Ríkisútvarpið (RÚV) had participated in the Eurovision Song Contest representing Iceland eighteen times since its first entry in 1986. Its best placing in the contest to this point was second, achieved in 1999 with the song "All Out of Luck" performed by Selma. Since the introduction of a semi-final to the format of the Eurovision Song Contest in 2004, Iceland has, to this point, yet to qualify to the final. In 2005, "If I Had Your Love" performed by Selma failed to qualify to the final.

As part of its duties as participating broadcaster, RÚV organises the selection of its entry in the Eurovision Song Contest and broadcasts the event in the country. The broadcaster confirmed its intentions to participate at the 2006 contest on 12 September 2005. In 2004 and 2005, RÚV opted to internally select its entry for the Eurovision Song Contest. For 2006, the broadcaster announced along with its participation confirmation that it would use a national final for the first time since 2003 to select its entry.

== Before Eurovision ==
=== Söngvakeppni Sjónvarpsins 2006 ===
Söngvakeppni Sjónvarpsins 2006 was the national final format developed by RÚV in order to select its entry for the Eurovision Song Contest 2006. The four shows in the competition were hosted by Garðar Thór Cortes and Brynhildur Guðjónsdóttir and all took place at the Fiskislóð 45 venue in Reykjavík. The semi-finals and final were broadcast on RÚV and online at the broadcaster's official website ruv.is.

==== Format ====
Twenty-four songs in total competed in Söngvakeppni Sjónvarpsins 2006 where the winner was determined after three semi-finals and a final. Eight songs competed in each semi-final on 21 January, 28 January and 4 February 2006. The top four songs from each semi-final qualified to the final which took place on 3 February 2007. The results of the semi-finals and final were determined by 100% public televoting, while two wildcard acts were selected by a jury for the final out of the fifth-placed acts from each of the semi-finals. All songs were required to be performed in Icelandic during all portions of the competition, however, it will be up to the winning composers to decide the language that will be performed at the Eurovision Song Contest 2006.

==== Competing entries ====
On 30 October 2005, RÚV opened the submission period for interested songwriters to submit their entries until the deadline on 18 November 2005. Songwriters were required to be Icelandic or possess Icelandic citizenship. At the close of the submission deadline, 226 entries were received. A selection committee was formed in order to select the top twenty-four entries. The twenty-four competing songs were revealed by the broadcaster during a press conference on 13 December 2005, while their artists were revealed on 16, 17 and 20 January 2006. Among the competing artists were previous Icelandic Eurovision entrants Gunnar Ólason, who represented Iceland in 2001 as part of Two Tricky, and Birgitta Haukdal, who represented Iceland in 2003.

Artist	Song	Songwriter(s)
Ardís Ólöf	"Eldur nýr"	Örlygur Smári, Niclas Kings, Daniella Vecchia
Birgitta Haukdal	"Mynd af þér"	Sveinn Rúnar Sigurðsson, Kristján Hreinsson
Bjartmar Þórðarson	"Á ég?"	Örlygur Smári, Sigurdur Örn Jonsson
Davíð Olgeirsson	"Strengjadans"	Davíð Olgeirsson
Dísella Lárusdóttir	"Útópía"	Sveinn Rúnar Sigurðsson, Kristján Hreinsson
Edgar Smári Atlason and Þóra Gísladóttir	"Stundin – staðurinn"	Ómar Þ. Ragnarsson
Eyjólfur Kristjánsson and Bergsveinn Arilíusson	"Lífið"	Eyjólfur Kristjánsson
Fanney Óskarsdóttir	"Hamingjusöm"	Fanney Óskarsdóttir
Friðrik Ómar	"Það sem verður"	Hallgrímur Óskarsson, Lára Unnur Ægisdóttir
Geir Ólafsson	"Dagurinn í dag"	Friðrik Hjörleifsson, Kristján Hreinsson
Guðrún Árný Karlsdóttir	"Andvaka"	Trausti Bjarnason
Gunnar Ólason	"María"	Roland Hartwell, Birgir S. Klingenberg
Gunnar Ólason	"Það var lagið"	Roland Hartwell, Birgir S. Klingenberg
Heiða	"100% hamingja"	Sveinn Rúnar Sigurðsson, Kristján Hreinsson
Íris Kristinsdóttir	"Ég sé"	Iris Kristinsdottir
Katy Þóra Winter	"Meðan hjartað slær"	Tómas Hermannsson, Ragnheiður Gröndal
Magni Ásgeirsson	"Flottur karl, Sæmi rokk"	Sævar Benediktsson
Maríanna Másdóttir	"Í faðmi þér"	Ingvi Þór Kormáksson, Valgeir Skagfjörð
Matthías Matthíasson	"Sést það ekki á mér?"	Sigurdur Örn Jonsson
Regína Ósk	"Þér við hlið"	Trausti Bjarnason, Magnús Þór Sigmundsson
Rúna Stefánsdóttir and Brynjar Már Valdimarsson	"100%"	Hördur G. Olafsson
Sigurjón Brink	"Hjartaþrá"	Bryndís Sunna Valdimarsdóttir, Þórir Úlfarsson
Silvía Nótt	"Til hamingju Ísland"	Þorvaldur Bjarni Þorvaldsson, Ágústa Eva Erlendsdóttir, Gaukur Úlfarsson
Sólveig Samúelsdóttir	"Mig langar að hafa þig hér"	Hallgrímur Óskarsson

==== Semi-finals ====
The three semi-finals took place on 21 January, 28 January and 4 February 2006. In each semi-final eight acts presented their entries, and the top four entries voted upon solely by public televoting proceeded to the final. "Sést það ekki á mér?" performed by Matthías Matthíasson and "Flottur karl, Sæmi rokk" performed by Magni Ásgeirsson were awarded the jury wildcards and also proceeded to the final. "Til hamingju Ísland" performed by Silvía Nótt directly qualified to compete in the final due to online leaks of the song prior to the competition, but still performed in the third semi-final.

Semi-final 1 – 21 January 2006
R/O	Artist	Song	Result
1	Gunnar Ólason	"Maria"	—N/a
2	Matthías Matthíasson	"Sést það ekki á mér?"	Wildcard
3	Edgar Smári Atlason and Þóra Gísladóttir	"Stundin – staðurinn"	Qualified
4	Íris Kristinsdóttir	"Ég sé"	—N/a
5	Friðrik Ómar	"Það sem verður"	Qualified
6	Maríanna Másdóttir	"Í faðmi þér"	—N/a
7	Regína Ósk	"Þér við hlið"	Qualified
8	Davíð Olgeirsson	"Strengjadans"	Qualified

Semi-final 2 – 28 January 2006
R/O	Artist	Song	Result
1	Geir Ólafsson	"Dagurinn í dag"	—N/a
2	Fanney Óskarsdóttir	"Hamingjusöm"	—N/a
3	Eyjólfur Kristjánsson and Bergsveinn Arilíusson	"Lífið"	—N/a
4	Guðrún Árný Karlsdóttir	"Andvaka"	Qualified
5	Magni Ásgeirsson	"Flottur karl, Sæmi rokk"	Wildcard
6	Ardís Ólöf	"Eldur nýr"	Qualified
7	Sigurjón Brink	"Hjartaþrá"	Qualified
8	Heiða	"100% hamingja"	Qualified

Semi-final 3 – 4 February 2006
R/O	Artist	Song	Result
1	Rúna Stefánsdóttir and Brynjar Már Valdimarsson	"100%"	Qualified
2	Dísella Lárusdóttir	"Útópía"	Qualified
3	Bjartmar Þórðarson	"Á ég?"	Qualified
4	Silvía Nótt	"Til hamingju Ísland"	Qualified
5	Katy Þóra Winter	"Meðan hjartað slær"	—N/a
6	Sólveig Samúelsdóttir	"Mig langar að hafa þig hér"	—N/a
7	Gunnar Ólason	"Það var lagið"	—N/a
8	Birgitta Haukdal	"Mynd af þér"	Qualified

==== Final ====
The final took place on 18 February 2006 where the fifteen entries that qualified from the preceding three semi-finals competed. The winner, "Til hamingju Ísland" performed Silvía Nótt, was determined solely by televoting. In addition to the performances of the competing artists, the interval acts featured guest performances by Bobbysocks! (who won Eurovision for Norway in 1985 with the song "La det swinge"), and Páll Óskar (who represented Iceland in 1997).

Final – 18 February 2006
R/O	Artist	Song	Televote	Place
1	Ardís Ólöf	"Eldur nýr"	—	—
2	Edgar Smári Atlason and Þóra Gísladóttir	"Stundin – staðurinn"	—	—
3	Dísella Lárusdóttir	"Útópía"	—	5
4	Magni Ásgeirsson	"Flottur karl, Sæmi rokk"	—	—
5	Friðrik Ómar	"Það sem verður"	9,942	3
6	Matthías Matthíasson	"Sést það ekki á mér?"	—	—
7	Heiða	"100% hamingja"	—	—
8	Davíð Olgeirsson	"Strengjadans"	—	—
9	Guðrún Árný Karlsdóttir	"Andvaka"	—	6
10	Sigurjón Brink	"Hjartaþrá"	—	—
11	Silvía Nótt	"Til hamingju Ísland"	70,190	1
12	Bjartmar Þórðarson	"Á ég?"	—	—
13	Birgitta Haukdal	"Mynd af þér"	—	4
14	Rúna Stefánsdóttir and Brynjar Már Valdimarsson	"100%"	—	7
15	Regína Ósk	"Þér við hlið"	30,018	2

== At Eurovision ==
The Eurovision Song Contest 2006 took place at the Olympic Indoor Arena in Athens, Greece.

According to Eurovision rules, all nations with the exceptions of the host country, the "Big Four" (France, Germany, Spain and the United Kingdom) and the ten highest placed finishers in the 2005 contest are required to qualify from the semi-final in order to compete for the final; the top ten countries from the semi-final progress to the final. On 21 March 2006, an allocation draw was held which determined the running order for the semi-final, to be held on 18 May 2006, and the final, to be held on 20 May 2006. Iceland was drawn to perform last in position 23, following the entry from Bosnia and Herzegovina. Silvía Night performed the English version of "Til hamingju Ísland", titled "Congratulations", during the semi-final and at the end of the show, Iceland was not announced among the top 10 entries and therefore failed to qualify to compete in the final. It was later revealed that the Iceland placed thirteenth in the semi-final, receiving a total of 62 points.

The semi-final and the final were broadcast in Iceland on RÚV with commentary by Sigmar Guðmundsson. RÚV appointed Ragnhildur Steinunn Jónsdóttir as its spokesperson to announce the results of the Icelandic televote during the final.

=== Voting ===
Below is a breakdown of points awarded to Iceland and awarded by Iceland in the semi-final and grand final of the contest. The nation awarded its 12 points to Finland in the semi-final and the final of the contest.

==== Points awarded to Iceland ====
Points awarded to Iceland (Semi-final)
Score	Country
12 points	
10 points	
8 points	
7 points	Denmark; Finland; Lithuania; Norway
6 points	Spain; Sweden
5 points	Estonia; United Kingdom
4 points	
3 points	Portugal
2 points	Ireland; Serbia and Montenegro
1 point	Bosnia and Herzegovina; Croatia; France; Latvia; Monaco

==== Points awarded by Iceland ====
Points awarded by Iceland (Semi-final)
Score	Country
12 points	Finland
10 points	Sweden
8 points	Lithuania
7 points	Bosnia and Herzegovina
6 points	Russia
5 points	Ukraine
4 points	Belgium
3 points	Poland
2 points	Ireland
1 point	Netherlands

Points awarded by Iceland (Final)
Score	Country
12 points	Finland
10 points	Lithuania
8 points	Denmark
7 points	Sweden
6 points	Ukraine
5 points	Russia
4 points	Norway
3 points	Bosnia and Herzegovina
2 points	Romania
1 point	Ireland

=== Controversy ===
Silvía Night's participation in the Eurovision Song Contest brought with it several moments of controversy, particularly over the lyrics of the English version of the song. The European Broadcasting Union (EBU) threatened to disqualify the entry due to the line "the vote is in, I'll fucking win" being used in the song. The contest's Executive supervisor Svante Stockselius formally informed the Icelandic delegation that the lyrics as written were in violation of the rules, however Silvía claimed at her press conferences that she would "fucking say what I fucking want". One set of lyrics published online featured the line "they say I win", prior to the formal objection being lodged.

Over the course of the rehearsals, Silvía continued to perform the lyrics as originally written. Her second dress rehearsal also featured abuse of the floor manager ("fuck off") and the audience ("fucking retards"). The expletive was eventually dropped for the live performance during the semi-final, with the line replaced by "the vote is in, I'll freaking win". Silvía was also booed off the stage following her performance.

Commentary both before and after Silvía's performance stressed the fact that she was a television character, rather than a real person. Her entire appearance, therefore, was in fact something of a joke at the expense of the contest – something Silvía herself picked up on when arguing at a press conference that people intending to enter the contest as a joke should not do so.
