= Iceland in the Eurovision Song Contest 2018 =

- Eurovision Song Contest 2018
- Participating broadcaster: Ríkisútvarpið (RÚV)
- Country: Iceland
- Selection process: Söngvakeppnin 2018
- Selection date: 3 March 2018

Competing entry
- Song: "Our Choice"
- Artist: Ari Ólafsson
- Songwriters: Þórunn Erna Clausen

Placement
- Semi-final result: Failed to qualify (19th, 15 points)

Participation chronology

Iceland was represented at the Eurovision Song Contest 2018 with the song "Our Choice" written by Þórunn Erna Clausen. The song was performed by Ari Ólafsson. The Icelandic entry for the 2018 contest in Lisbon, Portugal was selected through the national final Söngvakeppnin 2018, organised by the Icelandic broadcaster Ríkisútvarpið (RÚV). The selection consisted of two semi-finals and a final, held on 10 February, 17 February and 3 March 2018, respectively. Six songs competed in each semi-final with the top three as selected by a public televote advancing to the final. In the final, the winner was selected over two rounds of voting: the first involved a 50/50 combination of jury voting and public televoting, which reduced the six competing entries to two superfinalists and the second round selected the winner exclusively through public televoting. "Our Choice" performed by Ari Ólafsson emerged as the winner after gaining 53.23% of the public vote.

Iceland was drawn to compete in the first semi-final of the Eurovision Song Contest which took place on 8 May 2018. Performing during the show in position 2, "Our Choice" was not announced among the top 10 entries of the first semi-final and therefore did not qualify to compete in the final. It was later revealed that Iceland placed nineteenth (last) out of the 19 participating countries in the semi-final with 15 points.

== Background ==
Prior to the 2018 contest, Iceland had participated in the Eurovision Song Contest thirty times since its first entry in 1986. Iceland's best placing in the contest to this point was second, which it achieved on two occasions: in 1999 with the song "All Out of Luck" performed by Selma and in 2009 with the song "Is It True?" performed by Yohanna. Since the introduction of a semi-final to the format of the Eurovision Song Contest in 2004, Iceland has, to this point, failed to qualify to the final six times. In 2017, Iceland failed to qualify to the final with the song "Paper" performed by Svala.

The Icelandic national broadcaster, Ríkisútvarpið (RÚV), broadcasts the event within Iceland and organises the selection process for the nation's entry. RÚV confirmed their intentions to participate at the 2018 Eurovision Song Contest on 8 August 2017. Since 2006, Iceland has used a national final to select their entry for the Eurovision Song Contest, a method that continued for their 2018 participation.

== Before Eurovision ==
=== Söngvakeppnin 2018 ===
Söngvakeppnin 2018 was the national final format developed by RÚV in order to select Iceland's entry for the Eurovision Song Contest 2018. The three shows in the competition were hosted by Ragnhildur Steinunn Jónsdóttir, Jón Jónsson and Björg Magnúsdóttir and all took place in Reykjavík: the two semi-finals were held at the Háskólabíó venue and the final took place at the Laugardalshöll. The semi-finals and final were broadcast on RÚV and online at the broadcaster's official website ruv.is. The final was also broadcast via radio on Rás 2.

==== Format ====
Twelve songs in total competed in Söngvakeppnin 2018 where the winner was determined after two semi-finals and a final. Six songs competed in each semi-final on 10 and 17 February 2018. The top three songs from each semi-final, as determined by public televoting qualified to the final which took place on 3 March 2018. The rules stated that a jury was going to select a wildcard act for the final out of the remaining non-qualifying acts from both semi-finals, however, it was later decided that a wildcard would be unnecessary. The winning entry in the final was determined over two rounds of voting: the first to select the top two via 50/50 public televoting and jury voting and the second to determine the winner with 100% televoting. All songs were required to be performed in Icelandic during the semi-final portion of the competition. In the final, the song was required to be performed in the language that the artist intended to perform in at the Eurovision Song Contest in Lisbon. In addition to selecting the Icelandic entry for Eurovision, a monetary prize of 3 million Icelandic króna was awarded to the songwriters responsible for the winning entry.

==== Competing entries ====
On 6 September 2017, RÚV opened the submission period for interested songwriters to submit their entries until the deadline on 20 October 2017. Songwriters were required to be Icelandic, possess Icelandic citizenship or have permanent residency in Iceland between 1 September 2017 and 13 May 2018. However, exceptions would be made for minor collaborations with foreign songwriters as long as two-thirds of the composition and half of the lyrics are by Icelandic composers/lyricists. Composers had the right to submit up to two entries, while lyricists could contribute to an unlimited amount of entries. At the close of the submission deadline, over 200 entries were received. A seven-member selection committee was formed under consultation with the Association of Composers (FTT) and the Icelandic Musicians' Union (FÍH) in order to select the top twelve entries. The twelve competing artists and songs were revealed and presented by the broadcaster during the television programme Kynningarþáttur Söngvakeppninnar on 20 January 2018. Four of the competing entries that later qualified to the final entered English versions of their songs for the competition.

Artist	Song		Songwriter(s)
Artist	Icelandic Title	English Title	Songwriter(s)
Ari Ólafsson	"Heim"	"Our Choice"	Þórunn Erna Clausen
Aron Hannes	"Golddigger"	"Gold Digger"	Sveinn Rúnar Sigurðsson, Valgeir Magnússon, Jóel Ísaksson, Oskar Nyman
Áttan	"Hér með þér"	"Here for You"	Egill Ploder Ottósson, Nökkvi Fjalar Orrason
Dagur Sigurðsson	"Í stormi"	"Saviours"	Júlí Heiðar Halldórsson, Guðmundur Snorri Sigurðarson
Fókus	"Aldrei gefast upp"	"Battleline"	Þórunn Erna Clausen, Primož Poglajen, Jonas Gladnikoff, Michael James Down, Sigurjón Örn Böðvarsson, Rósa Björg Ómarsdóttir
Guðmundur Þórarinsson	"Litir"	"Colours"	Guðmundur Þórarinson, Fannar Freyr Magnússon
Heimilistónar	"Kúst og fæjó"	—N/a	Elva Ósk, Katla Margrét Þorgeirsdóttir, Ólafía Hrönn Jónsdóttir, Vigdís Gunnarsdóttir
Rakel Pálsdóttir	"Óskin mín"	"My Wish"	Hallgrímur Bergsson, Nicholas Hammond
Stefanía, Agnes and Regína	"Svaka stuð"	"Heart Attack"	Agnes Marínósdóttir, Aron Þór Arnarsson, Marino Breki Benjamínsson
Tómas and Sólborg	"Ég og þú"	"Think It Through"	Tómas Helgi Wehmeier, Sólborg Guðbrandsdóttir, Rob Price
Þórir and Gyða	"Brosa"	"With You"	Guðmundur Þórarinson, Fannar Freyr Magnússon
Þórunn Antonía	"Ég mun skína"	"Shine"	Þórunn Antonía Magnúsdóttir, Agnar Friðbertsson

==== Semi-finals ====
Two semi-finals took place on 10 and 17 February 2018. Guðmundur Þórarinsson swapped semi-finals with Þórir and Gyða due to his involvement in a football cup match for IFK Norrköping. In each semi-final six acts presented their entries, and the top three entries voted upon solely by public televoting proceeded to the final.

The shows also featured guest performances by Sigríður Thorlacius and Valdimar Guðmundsson in the first semi-final, and Magni Ásgeirsson and 2006 Icelandic Eurovision entrant Ágústa Eva Erlendsdóttir in the second semi-final. Thorlacius and Guðmundsson performed an Icelandic version of the 2017 Eurovision winning entry "Amar pelos dois", while Ásgeirsson and Erlendsdóttir performed an Icelandic version of the 2014 Dutch Eurovision entry "Calm After the Storm".

Semi-final 1 – 10 February 2018
R/O	Artist	Song	Place
1	Þórunn Antonía	"Ég mun skína"	5
2	Tómas and Sólborg	"Ég og þú"	6
3	Ari Ólafsson	"Heim"	—
4	Heimilistónar	"Kúst og fæjó"	—
5	Fókus	"Aldrei gefast upp"	—
6	Guðmundur Þórarinsson	"Litir"	4

Semi-final 2 – 17 February 2018
R/O	Artist	Song	Place
1	Aron Hannes	"Golddigger"	—
2	Rakel Pálsdóttir	"Óskin mín"	6
3	Stefanía, Agnes and Regína	"Svaka stuð"	5
4	Þórir and Gyða	"Brosa"	4
5	Dagur Sigurðsson	"Í stormi"	—
6	Áttan	"Hér með þér"	—

==== Final ====
The final took place on 3 March 2018 where the six entries that qualified from the preceding two semi-finals competed. In the semi-finals, all competing entries were required to be performed in Icelandic; however, entries competing in the final were required to be presented in the language they would compete with in the Eurovision Song Contest. Two entries remained in Icelandic ("Í stormi" performed by Dagur Sigurðsson and "Kúst og fæjó" performed by Heimilistónar), while the other four entries competed in English. In the first round of voting, votes from a seven-member international and Icelandic jury panel (50%) and public televoting (50%) determined the top two entries. The top two entries advanced to a second round of voting, the superfinal, where the winner, "Our Choice" performed by Ari Ólafsson, was determined solely by televoting.

The jury panel that voted in the first round consisted of:

- Aleksander Radić (Slovenia) – Eurovision Slovenian Head of Delegation
- Emmelie de Forest (Denmark) – singer-songwriter, won Eurovison for Denmark in 2013
- Halldór Eldjárn (Iceland) – radio programmer
- Hulda G. Geirsdóttir (Iceland) – musician
- Joana Levieva-Sawyer (Bulgaria) – Eurovision Bulgarian Head of Delegation
- Robin Bengtsson (Sweden) – singer, represented Sweden in 2017
- Svala Björgvinsdóttir (Iceland) – singer-songwriter, represented Iceland in 2017

In addition to the performances of the competing artists, the interval acts featured guest performances by Emmelie de Forest and Robin Bengtsson.

Final – 3 March 2018
R/O	Artist	Song	Jury	Televote	Total	Place
1	Fókus	"Battleline"	13,091	12,859	25,950	5
2	Áttan	"Here for You"	10,637	3,360	13,997	6
3	Ari Ólafsson	"Our Choice"	17,453	18,408	35,861	2
4	Heimilistónar	"Kúst og fæjó"	14,183	17,619	31,802	3
5	Aron Hannes	"Gold Digger"	16,090	14,848	30,938	4
6	Dagur Sigurðsson	"Í stormi"	20,183	24,547	44,730	1

Detailed Jury Votes
R/O	Song	Juror							Total
R/O	Song	1	2	3	4	5	6	7	Total
1	"Battleline"	2,182	1,636	1,636	1,909	1,364	2,182	2,182	13,091
2	"Here for You"	1,636	1,364	1,364	1,364	1,636	1,364	1,909	10,637
3	"Our Choice"	2,727	2,727	3,273	1,636	2,727	1,636	2,727	17,453
4	"Kúst og fæjó"	1,364	1,909	1,909	2,182	2,182	3,273	1,364	14,183
5	"Gold Digger"	1,909	3,273	2,182	2,727	1,909	1,909	1,636	16,090
6	"Í stormi"	3,273	2,182	2,727	3,273	3,273	2,727	3,273	20,183

Superfinal – 3 March 2018
R/O	Artist	Song	Televote	Place
1	Ari Ólafsson	"Our Choice"	44,919	1
2	Dagur Sigurðsson	"Í stormi"	39,474	2

=== Promotion ===
Ari Ólafsson made several appearances across Europe to specifically promote "Our Choice" as the Icelandic Eurovision entry. On 11 March, Ari Ólafsson performed "Our Choice" during the final of the Lithuanian Eurovision national final. On 5 April, Ólafsson performed during the London Eurovision Party, which was held at the Café de Paris venue in London, United Kingdom and hosted by Nicki French and Paddy O'Connell. Between 8 and 11 April, Ólafsson took part in promotional activities in Tel Aviv, Israel and performed during the Israel Calling event held at the Rabin Square. On 14 April, Ólafsson performed during the Eurovision in Concert event which was held at the AFAS Live venue in Amsterdam, Netherlands and hosted by Edsilia Rombley and Cornald Maas. On 21 April, Ólafsson performed during the ESPreParty event on 21 April which was held at the Sala La Riviera venue in Madrid, Spain and hosted by Soraya Arnelas.

== At Eurovision ==
According to Eurovision rules, all nations with the exceptions of the host country and the "Big Five" (France, Germany, Italy, Spain and the United Kingdom) are required to qualify from one of two semi-finals in order to compete for the final; the top ten countries from each semi-final progress to the final. The European Broadcasting Union (EBU) split up the competing countries into six different pots based on voting patterns from previous contests, with countries with favourable voting histories put into the same pot. On 29 January 2018, a special allocation draw was held which placed each country into one of the two semi-finals, as well as which half of the show they would perform in. Iceland was placed into the first semi-final, to be held on 8 May 2018, and was scheduled to perform in the first half of the show.

Once all the competing songs for the 2018 contest had been released, the running order for the semi-finals was decided by the shows' producers rather than through another draw, so that similar songs were not placed next to each other. Iceland was set to perform in position 2, following the entry from Azerbaijan and before the entry from Albania.

The two semi-finals and the final were broadcast in Iceland on RÚV with commentary by Gísli Marteinn Baldursson. The Icelandic spokesperson, who announced the top 12-point score awarded by the Icelandic jury during the final, was Edda Sif Pálsdóttir.

=== Semi-final ===
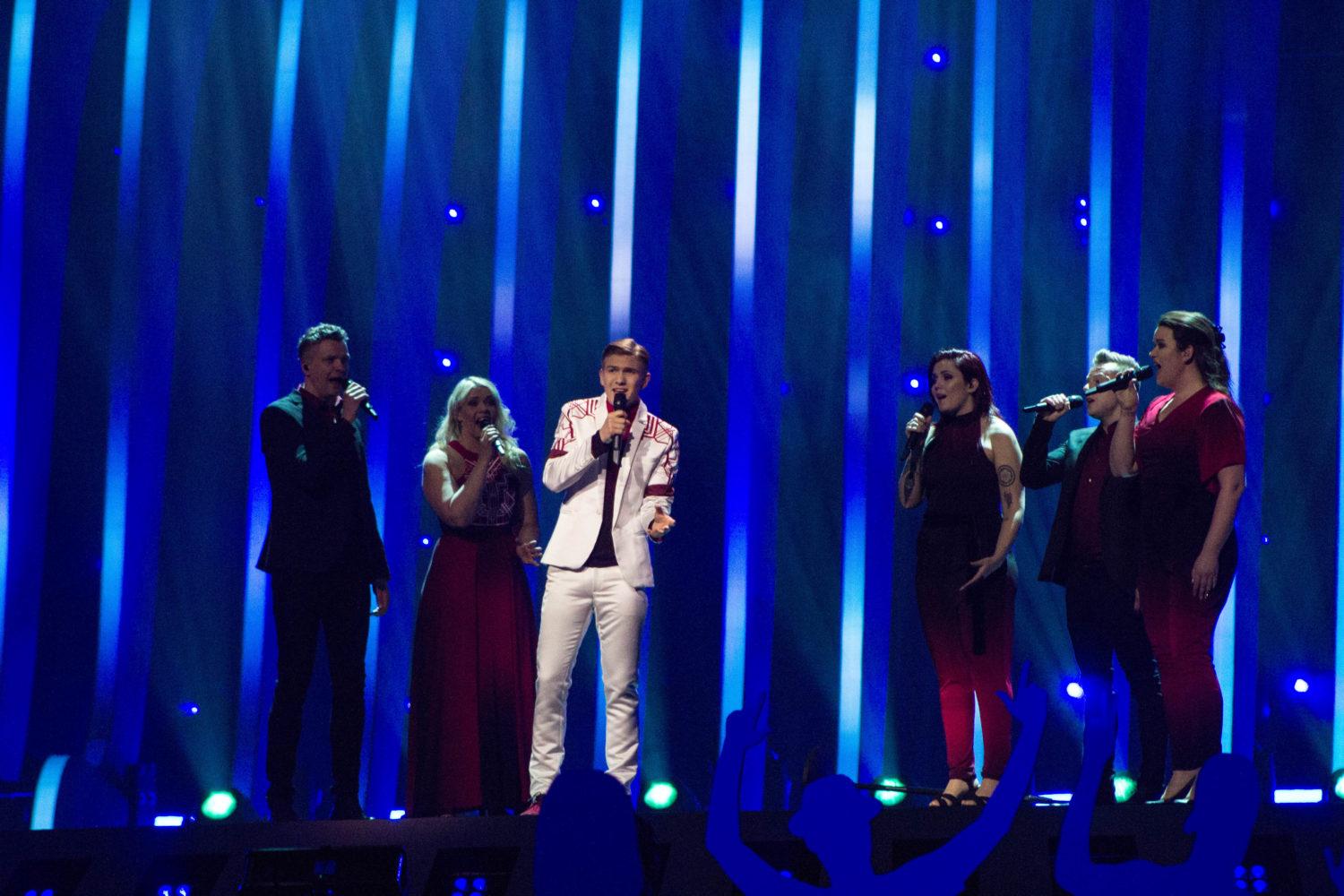
Ari Ólafsson during a rehearsal before the first semi-final

Ari Ólafsson took part in technical rehearsals on 29 April and 3 May, followed by dress rehearsals on 7 and 8 May. This included the jury show on 7 May where the professional juries of each country watched and voted on the competing entries.

The Icelandic performance featured Ari Ólafsson dressed in a white suit with red geoprint and with a red turtleneck underneath, joined on stage by five backing vocalists dressed in red and black outfits. The stage lighting transitioned from blue to red and gold colours. The backing vocalists that joined Ari Ólafsson were: Arna Rún Ómarsdóttir, Erla Stefánsdóttir, Gunnar Leó Pálsson, Vignir Snær Vigfússon and the composer of "Our Choice" Þórunn Erna Clausen. Vignir Snær Vigfússon previously represented Iceland in 2011 as part of Sjonni's Friends.

At the end of the show, Iceland was not announced among the top 10 entries in the first semi-final and therefore failed to qualify to compete in the final. It was later revealed that Iceland placed nineteenth (last) in the semi-final, receiving a total of 15 points: 0 points from the televoting and 15 points from the juries.

=== Voting ===
Voting during the three shows involved each country awarding two sets of points from 1-8, 10 and 12: one from their professional jury and the other from televoting. Each nation's jury consisted of five music industry professionals who are citizens of the country they represent, with their names published before the contest to ensure transparency. This jury judged each entry based on: vocal capacity; the stage performance; the song's composition and originality; and the overall impression by the act. In addition, no member of a national jury was permitted to be related in any way to any of the competing acts in such a way that they cannot vote impartially and independently. The individual rankings of each jury member as well as the nation's televoting results were released shortly after the grand final.

Below is a breakdown of points awarded to Iceland and awarded by Iceland in the first semi-final and grand final of the contest, and the breakdown of the jury voting and televoting conducted during the two shows:

==== Points awarded to Iceland ====
Points awarded to Iceland (Semi-final 1)
Score	Televote	Jury
12 points		
10 points		
8 points		
7 points		Belarus
6 points		
5 points		
4 points		Czech Republic
3 points		
2 points		Macedonia
1 point		Belgium; Switzerland

==== Points awarded by Iceland ====
Points awarded by Iceland (Semi-final 1)
Score	Televote	Jury
12 points	Czech Republic	Albania
10 points	Finland	Israel
8 points	Israel	Ireland
7 points	Austria	Austria
6 points	Estonia	Estonia
5 points	Cyprus	Czech Republic
4 points	Ireland	Finland
3 points	Lithuania	Switzerland
2 points	Switzerland	Belgium
1 point	Azerbaijan	Greece

Points awarded by Iceland (Final)
Score	Televote	Jury
12 points	Denmark	Austria
10 points	Czech Republic	Albania
8 points	Germany	Israel
7 points	Israel	Estonia
6 points	France	Germany
5 points	Austria	Sweden
4 points	Norway	Ireland
3 points	Finland	France
2 points	Sweden	Cyprus
1 point	Cyprus	Czech Republic

=== Detailed voting results ===
The following members comprised the Icelandic jury:

- Védís Hervör Árnadóttir (jury chairperson) – singer, songwriter
- Hlynur Benediktsson – singer, songwriter
- Hannes Friðbjarnarson – musician
- Jón Rafnsson – musician
- Erla Jónatansdóttir – singer, music teacher

Detailed voting results from Iceland (Semi-final 1)
R/O	Country	Jury							Televote	
R/O	Country	H. Benediktsson	H. Friðbjarnarson	J. Rafnsson	V. Hervör Árnadóttir	E. Jónatansdóttir	Rank	Points	Rank	Points
01	Azerbaijan	15	14	8	17	14	16		10	1
02	Iceland									
03	Albania	2	1	7	4	4	1	12	14	
04	Belgium	3	12	5	12	13	9	2	12	
05	Czech Republic	7	13	1	6	8	6	5	1	12
06	Lithuania	6	15	11	9	17	13		8	3
07	Israel	5	3	3	5	2	2	10	3	8
08	Belarus	18	18	18	15	16	18		15	
09	Estonia	10	5	4	2	6	5	6	5	6
10	Bulgaria	13	6	6	14	10	11		11	
11	Macedonia	12	17	17	18	18	17		18	
12	Croatia	11	16	16	16	7	15		16	
13	Austria	9	4	10	1	3	4	7	4	7
14	Greece	16	10	2	13	11	10	1	13	
15	Finland	4	7	9	11	5	7	4	2	10
16	Armenia	14	8	15	10	15	14		17	
17	Switzerland	1	11	14	7	12	8	3	9	2
18	Ireland	8	2	13	3	1	3	8	7	4
19	Cyprus	17	9	12	8	9	12		6	5

Detailed voting results from Iceland (Final)
R/O	Country	Jury							Televote	
R/O	Country	H. Benediktsson	H. Friðbjarnarson	J. Rafnsson	V. Hervör Árnadóttir	E. Jónatansdóttir	Rank	Points	Rank	Points
01	Ukraine	22	22	23	25	22	25		20	
02	Spain	8	11	24	13	9	14		23	
03	Slovenia	10	4	21	14	24	13		21	
04	Lithuania	16	25	17	15	21	22		11	
05	Austria	1	2	9	1	3	1	12	6	5
06	Estonia	9	3	6	2	10	4	7	12	
07	Norway	17	20	15	19	17	21		7	4
08	Portugal	23	10	18	7	16	15		26	
09	United Kingdom	3	12	20	10	11	11		15	
10	Serbia	21	24	10	16	12	17		24	
11	Germany	4	14	5	11	1	5	6	3	8
12	Albania	2	1	11	5	2	2	10	25	
13	France	18	13	4	6	8	8	3	5	6
14	Czech Republic	12	19	1	17	14	10	1	2	10
15	Denmark	20	15	7	22	19	16		1	12
16	Australia	13	18	19	18	18	20		19	
17	Finland	6	8	8	20	13	12		8	3
18	Bulgaria	26	23	22	23	23	26		22	
19	Moldova	24	26	16	26	25	23		17	
20	Sweden	15	6	2	4	7	6	5	9	2
21	Hungary	14	9	25	21	20	18		16	
22	Israel	5	5	3	8	4	3	8	4	7
23	Netherlands	19	21	14	12	15	19		14	
24	Ireland	11	17	12	3	5	7	4	13	
25	Cyprus	7	7	13	9	6	9	2	10	1
26	Italy	25	16	26	24	26	24		18	
