= Iceland in the Eurovision Song Contest 2011 =

- Eurovision Song Contest 2011
- Participating broadcaster: Ríkisútvarpið (RÚV)
- Country: Iceland
- Selection process: Söngvakeppni Sjónvarpsins 2011
- Selection date: 12 February 2011

Competing entry
- Song: "Coming Home"
- Artist: Sjonni's Friends
- Songwriters: Sigurjón Brink; Þórunn Erna Clausen

Placement
- Semi-final result: Qualified (4th, 100 points)
- Final result: 20th, 61 points

Participation chronology

Iceland was represented at the Eurovision Song Contest 2011 with the song "Coming Home" written by Sigurjón Brink and Þórunn Erna Clausen. The song was performed by the tribute band Sjonni's Friends. Among the band members was Gunnar Ólason who previously represented Iceland in the Eurovision Song Contest 2001 as part of the duo Two Tricky, where they placed twenty-second in the competition with the song "Angel". The Icelandic entry for the 2011 contest in Düsseldorf, Germany was selected through the national final Söngvakeppni Sjónvarpsins 2011, organised by the Icelandic broadcaster Ríkisútvarpið (RÚV). The selection consisted of three semi-finals and a final, held on 15 January, 22 January, 29 January and 12 February 2011, respectively. Five songs competed in each semi-final with the top two/three as selected by a public televote advancing to the final. In the final, "Aftur heim" performed by Sigurjón's Friends emerged as the winner exclusively through public televoting. The song was later translated from Icelandic to English for the Eurovision Song Contest and was titled "Coming Home", while the band was renamed as Sjonni's Friends.

Iceland was drawn to compete in the first semi-final of the Eurovision Song Contest which took place on 10 May 2011. Performing during the show in position 14, "Coming Home" was announced among the top 10 entries of the first semi-final and therefore qualified to compete in the final on 14 May. It was later revealed that the Iceland placed fourth out of the 19 participating countries in the semi-final with 100 points. In the final, Iceland performed in position 21 and placed twentieth out of the 25 participating countries, scoring 61 points.

== Background ==
Prior to the 2011 contest, Iceland had participated in the Eurovision Song Contest twenty-three times since its first entry in 1986. Iceland's best placing in the contest to this point was second, which it achieved on two occasions: in 1999 with the song "All Out of Luck" performed by Selma and in 2009 with the song "Is It True?" performed by Yohanna. Since the introduction of a semi-final to the format of the Eurovision Song Contest in 2004, Iceland has, to this point, only failed to qualify to the final three times. In 2010, Iceland managed to qualify to the final and placed nineteenth with the song "Je ne sais quoi" performed by Hera Björk.

The Icelandic national broadcaster, Ríkisútvarpið (RÚV), broadcasts the event within Iceland and organises the selection process for the nation's entry. RÚV confirmed their intentions to participate at the 2011 Eurovision Song Contest on 2 June 2010. Since 2006, Iceland has used a national final to select their entry for the Eurovision Song Contest, a method that continued for their 2011 participation.

== Before Eurovision ==
=== Söngvakeppni Sjónvarpsins 2011 ===
Söngvakeppni Sjónvarpsins 2011 was the national final format developed by RÚV in order to select Iceland's entry for the Eurovision Song Contest 2011. The four shows in the competition were hosted by Ragnhildur Steinunn Jónsdóttir and Guðmundur Gunnarsson and all took place at the RÚV studios in Reykjavík. The semi-finals and final were broadcast on RÚV and online at the broadcaster's official website ruv.is. The final was also streamed online at the Eurovision Song Contest official website eurovision.tv.

==== Format ====
Fifteen songs in total competed in Söngvakeppni Sjónvarpsins 2011 where the winner was determined after three semi-finals and a final. Five songs competed in each semi-final on 15, 22 and 29 January 2011. The top two songs from each semi-final qualified to the final which took place on 12 February 2011. The results of the semi-finals and final were determined by 100% public televoting. All songs were required to be performed in Icelandic during all portions of the competition, however, it will be up to the winning composers to decide the language that will be performed at the Eurovision Song Contest in Düsseldorf.

==== Competing entries ====
On 14 September 2010, RÚV opened the submission period for interested songwriters to submit their entries until the deadline on 18 October 2010. Songwriters were required to be Icelandic or possess Icelandic citizenship, and had the right to collaborate with foreign songwriters and submit up to three entries. At the close of the submission deadline, 174 entries were received. A selection committee was formed in order to select the top fifteen entries. RÚV presented the fifteen competing artists and songs on 10, 17 and 24 January 2011 via radio on Rás 2. Among the competing artists were previous Icelandic Eurovision entrant Kristján Gíslason, who represented Iceland in 2001 as part of Two Tricky, and Jóhanna Guðrún Jónsdóttir, who represented Iceland in 2009. Sigurjón Brink was initially announced as the performer of the song "Aftur heim", however, RÚV announced on 23 January 2011 that his song would be performed by Sigurjón's Friends instead following his sudden death in Garðabær on 17 January. Among the members of Sigurjón's Friends was Gunnar Ólason, who represented Iceland in 2001 as part of Two Tricky.

Artist	Song	Songwriter(s)
Böddi and JJ Soul Band	"Lagið þitt"	Ingvi Þór Kormáksson
Bryndís Ásmundsdóttir	"Segðu mér"	Jakob Jóhannsson, Tómas Guðmundsson
Erna Hrönn Ólafsdóttir	"Ástin mín eina"	Arnar Ástráðsson
Georg Alexander	"Morgunsól"	Jóhannes Kára Kristinsson
Hanna Guðný Hitchon	"Huldumey"	Ragnar Hermannsson, Anna Þóra Jónsdóttir
Haraldur Reynisson	"Ef ég hefði vængi"	Haraldur Reynisson
Hljómsveitin Buff	"Sáluhjálp"	Pétur Örn Guðmundsson
Jógvan Hansen	"Ég lofa"	Vigni Snæ Vigfússon, Jógvan Hansen, Sigurður Örn Jónsson
Kristján Gíslason and Íslenzka Sveitin	"Þessi þrá"	Albert G. Jónsson
Magni Ásgeirsson	"Ég trúi á betra líf"	Hallgrím Óskarsson, Eiríkur Hauksson, Gerard James Borg
Matthías Matthíasson and Erla Björg Káradóttir	"Eldgos"	Matthías Stefánsson, Kristján Hreinsson
Pétur Örn Guðmundsson	"Elísabet"	Pétur Örn Guðmundsson
Rakel Mjöll Leifsdóttir	"Beint á ská"	Tómas Hermannsson, Orri Harðarson, Rakel Mjöll Leifsdóttir
Sigurjón's Friends	"Aftur heim"	Sigurjón Brink, Þórunn Erna Clausen
Yohanna	"Nótt"	María Björk Sverrisdóttir, Marcus Frenell, Beatrice, Magnús Þór Sigmundsson

==== Semi-finals ====
The three semi-finals took place on 15, 22 and 29 January 2011. In each semi-final five acts presented their entries, and the top two entries voted upon solely by public televoting proceeded to the final. "Aftur heim" performed by Sigurjón's Friends directly qualified to compete in the final but still performed in the third semi-final.

Semi-final 1 – 15 January 2011
R/O	Artist	Song	Result
1	Böddi and JJ Soul Band	"Lagið þitt"	—N/a
2	Haraldur Reynisson	"Ef ég hefði vængi"	Advanced
3	Pétur Örn Guðmundsson	"Elísabet"	—N/a
4	Hanna Guðný Hitchon	"Huldumey"	—N/a
5	Erna Hrönn Ólafsdóttir	"Ástin mín eina"	Advanced

Semi-final 2 – 22 January 2011
R/O	Artist	Song	Result
1	Yohanna	"Nótt"	Advanced
2	Bryndís Ásmundsdóttir	"Segðu mér"	—N/a
3	Kristján Gíslason and Íslenzka Sveitin	"Þessi þrá"	—N/a
4	Rakel Mjöll Leifsdóttir	"Beint á ská"	—N/a
5	Matthías Matthíasson and Erla Björg Káradóttir	"Eldgos"	Advanced

Semi-final 3 – 29 January 2011
R/O	Artist	Song	Result
1	Hljómsveitin Buff	"Sáluhjálp"	—N/a
2	Jógvan Hansen	"Ég lofa"	Advanced
3	Magni Ásgeirsson	"Ég trúi á betra líf"	Advanced
4	Georg Alexander	"Morgunsól"	—N/a
5	Sigurjón's Friends	"Aftur heim"	Advanced

==== Final ====
The final took place on 12 February 2011 where the seven entries that qualified from the preceding three semi-finals competed. The winner, "Aftur heim" performed Sigurjón's Friends, was determined solely by televoting. In addition to the performances of the competing artists, the show was opened by 1990 Icelandic Eurovision entrant Stjórnin performing their song "Eitt lag enn", while the interval act featured guest performances by 2010 Icelandic Eurovision entrant Hera Björk.

Final – 12 February 2011
R/O	Artist	Song	Televote	Place
1	Haraldur Reynisson	"Ef ég hefði vængi"	—	—
2	Erna Hrönn Ólafsdóttir	"Ástin mín eina"	—	—
3	Yohanna	"Nótt"	—	—
4	Matthías Matthíasson and Erla Björg Káradóttir	"Eldgos"	—	—
5	Jógvan Hansen	"Ég lofa"	—	—
6	Magni Ásgeirsson	"Ég trúi á betra líf"	18,506	2
7	Sigurjón's Friends	"Aftur heim"	25,449	1

=== Preparation ===
On 14 March 2011, it was announced that "Aftur heim" would be performed in English at the Eurovision Song Contest and would be titled "Coming Home". The official music video for the song, filmed in early March 2011 at a barn in Mosfellsdalur, was presented to the public on Rás 2 and during the television programme Kastljós the same day.

== At Eurovision ==
According to Eurovision rules, all nations with the exceptions of the host country and the "Big Five" (France, Germany, Italy, Spain and the United Kingdom) are required to qualify from one of two semi-finals in order to compete for the final; the top ten countries from each semi-final progress to the final. The European Broadcasting Union (EBU) split up the competing countries into six different pots based on voting patterns from previous contests, with countries with favourable voting histories put into the same pot. On 17 January 2011, a special allocation draw was held which placed each country into one of the two semi-finals, as well as which half of the show they would perform in. Iceland was placed into the first semi-final, to be held on 10 May 2011, and was scheduled to perform in the second half of the show. The running order for the semi-finals was decided through another draw on 15 March 2011 and Iceland was set to perform in position 14, following the entry from Croatia and before the entry from Hungary.

The two semi-finals and the final were broadcast in Iceland on RÚV with commentary by Hrafnhildur Halldorsdóttir. The Icelandic spokesperson, who announced the Icelandic votes during the final, was Ragnhildur Steinunn Jónsdóttir.

=== Semi-final ===
Sjonni's Friends took part in technical rehearsals on 8 and 11 May, followed by dress rehearsals on 15 and 16 May. This included the jury show on 15 May where the professional juries of each country watched and voted on the competing entries.

The Icelandic performance featured the members of Sjonni's Friends performing in a band set-up dressed in predominantly white and grey outfits. The LED screens displayed graphics of rotating mechanical cogs which transitioned between orange and green colours throughout the performance. The drummer of the band, Benedikt Brynleifsson, sat on a saddle in commemoration of the co-composer and initial performer of "Coming Home" Sigurjón Brink's love of horses, while the drums displayed the title of one of Brink's songs "Love Is You".

At the end of the show, Iceland was announced as having finished in the top 10 and subsequently qualifying for the grand final. It was later revealed that Iceland placed fourth in the semi-final, receiving a total of 100 points.

=== Final ===
Shortly after the first semi-final, a winners' press conference was held for the ten qualifying countries. As part of this press conference, the qualifying artists took part in a draw to determine the running order for the final. This draw was done in the order the countries were announced during the semi-final. Iceland was drawn to perform in position 21, following the entry from Slovenia and before the entry from Spain.

Sjonni's Friends once again took part in dress rehearsals on 13 and 14 May before the final, including the jury final where the professional juries cast their final votes before the live show. The band performed a repeat of their semi-final performance during the final on 14 May. Iceland placed twentieth in the final, scoring 61 points.

=== Voting ===
Voting during the three shows consisted of 50 percent public televoting and 50 percent from a jury deliberation. The jury consisted of five music industry professionals who were citizens of the country they represent. This jury was asked to judge each contestant based on: vocal capacity; the stage performance; the song's composition and originality; and the overall impression by the act. In addition, no member of a national jury could be related in any way to any of the competing acts in such a way that they cannot vote impartially and independently.

Following the release of the full split voting by the EBU after the conclusion of the competition, it was revealed that Iceland had placed nineteenth with both the public televote and the jury vote in the final. In the public vote, Iceland scored 60 points, while with the jury vote, Iceland scored 72 points. In the first semi-final, Iceland placed sixth with the public televote with 79 points and third with the jury vote, scoring 104 points.

Below is a breakdown of points awarded to Iceland and awarded by Iceland in the first semi-final and grand final of the contest. The nation awarded its 12 points to Finland in the semi-final and to Denmark in the final of the contest.

==== Points awarded to Iceland ====
Points awarded to Iceland (Semi-final 1)
Score	Country
12 points	Hungary; Spain
10 points	Finland; Norway; Portugal
8 points	Lithuania; Serbia; Switzerland
7 points	United Kingdom
6 points	Greece
5 points	
4 points	Poland
3 points	Russia
2 points	Armenia
1 point	

Points awarded to Iceland (Final)
Score	Country
12 points	Hungary
10 points	Switzerland
8 points	Finland; Norway
7 points	
6 points	Denmark
5 points	Italy
4 points	Portugal; United Kingdom
3 points	
2 points	Spain
1 point	Bosnia and Herzegovina; Sweden

==== Points awarded by Iceland ====
Points awarded by Iceland (Semi-final 1)
Score	Country
12 points	Finland
10 points	Norway
8 points	Azerbaijan
7 points	Hungary
6 points	Switzerland
5 points	Serbia
4 points	Armenia
3 points	Russia
2 points	Lithuania
1 point	Croatia

Points awarded by Iceland (Final)
Score	Country
12 points	Denmark
10 points	Finland
8 points	Azerbaijan
7 points	Sweden
6 points	Germany
5 points	Hungary
4 points	Ireland
3 points	Italy
2 points	United Kingdom
1 point	Russia
