= Iceland in the Eurovision Song Contest 2010 =

- Eurovision Song Contest 2010
- Participating broadcaster: Ríkisútvarpið (RÚV)
- Country: Iceland
- Selection process: Söngvakeppni Sjónvarpsins 2010
- Selection date: 6 February 2010

Competing entry
- Song: "Je ne sais quoi"
- Artist: Hera Björk
- Songwriters: Örlygur Smári; Hera Björk

Placement
- Semi-final result: Qualified (3rd, 123 points)
- Final result: 19th, 41 points

Participation chronology

Iceland was represented at the Eurovision Song Contest 2010 with the song "Je ne sais quoi", written by Örlygur Smári and Hera Björk and performed by Hera Björk herself. The Icelandic participating broadcaster, Ríkisútvarpið (RÚV), selected its entry through the national final Söngvakeppni Sjónvarpsins 2010. The selection process consisted of three semi-finals and a final, held on 9 January, 16 January, 23 January and 6 February 2010, respectively. Five songs competed in each semi-final with the top two as selected by a public televote advancing to the final. In the final, "Je ne sais quoi" performed by Björk emerged as the winner exclusively through public televoting. Promotional activities for the entry included the release of a music video and album and performances of the song in Norway and at the UKeurovision Preview Party in London.

Iceland was drawn to compete in the first semi-final of the Eurovision Song Contest which took place on 25 May 2010. Performing as the closing entry of the show in position 17, "Je ne sais quoi" was announced among the top 10 entries of the first semi-final and therefore qualified to compete in the final on 29 May. It was later revealed that the Iceland placed third out of the 17 participating countries in the semi-final with 123 points. In the final, Iceland performed in position 16 and placed 19th out of the 25 participating countries, scoring 41 points.

== Background ==
Prior to the 2010 contest, contest, Ríkisútvarpið (RÚV) had participated in the Eurovision Song Contest representing Iceland twenty-two times since its first entry in 1986. Its best placing in the contest to this point was second, achieved on two occasions: in 1999 with the song "All Out of Luck" performed by Selma and in 2009 with the song "Is It True?" performed by Yohanna. Since the introduction of a semi-final to the format of the Eurovision Song Contest in 2004, Iceland has, to this point, only failed to qualify to the final three times.

As part of its duties as participating broadcaster, RÚV organises the selection of its entry in the Eurovision Song Contest and broadcasts the event in the country. The broadcaster confirmed its intentions to participate in the 2010 contest on 9 September 2009. Since 2006, RÚV has used a national final to select its entry for the Eurovision Song Contest, a method that continued for its 2010 participation. (Note: This acts as a summary of the history of the selection process, 2005–2010.)

== Before Eurovision ==
=== Söngvakeppni Sjónvarpsins 2010 ===
The logo of Söngvakeppni Sjónvarpsins 2010

Söngvakeppni Sjónvarpsins 2010 was the national final format developed by RÚV to select Iceland's entry for the Eurovision Song Contest 2010. It consisted of five shows (three semi-finals, a summary show and a final), hosted by Ragnhildur Steinunn Jónsdóttir and Eva María Jónsdóttir, all taking place at the RÚV studios in Reykjavík. Fifteen songs competed in total, with five in each respective semi-final on held 9, 16 and 23 January 2010. The top two songs from each semi-final qualified to the final which took place on 6 February 2010. The results of the semi-finals and final were determined by public televoting. The semi-finals and final were broadcast on RÚV and online at the broadcaster's official website ruv.is. The final was also streamed online at the Eurovision Song Contest official website eurovision.tv.

==== Competing entries ====
On 9 September 2009, RÚV opened the submission period for interested songwriters to submit their entries until the deadline on 5 October 2009. Songwriters were required to be Icelandic or possess Icelandic citizenship and could submit up to three entries. Non-Icelandic songwriters could also participate in the competition if they joined with an Icelandic singer. At the close of the submission deadline, 150 entries were received. A selection committee was then formed to select the top fourteen entries, while an additional entry came from Óskar Páll Sveinsson, composer of the winning song from the year prior, who had been invited to the competition by RÚV. The fifteen competing artists and songs were revealed by the broadcaster on 18 December 2009.

Competing entries
Artist	Song	Songwriter(s)
Anna Hlín	"Komdu á morgun til mín"	Grétar Sigurbergsson
Arnar Jónsson	"Þúsund stjörnur"	Jóhannes Kári Kristinsson
Edgar Smári Atlason	"Now and Forever"	Albert Guðmann Jónsson, Albert Guðmann Jónsson, Katrín Halldórsdóttir
Hera Björk	"Je ne sais quoi"	Örlygur Smári, Hera Björk
Hvanndalsbræður	"Gleði og glens"	Rögnvaldur Rögnvaldsson
Íris Hólm	"The One"	Birgir Jóhann Birgisson, Ingvi Þór Kormáksson
Jógvan Hansen	"One More Day"	Óskar Páll Sveinsson, Bubbi Morthens
Karen Pálsdóttir	"In the Future"	Bryndís Sunna Valdimarsdóttir, Daði Georgsson, Bryndís Sunna Valdimarsdóttir
Kolbrún Eva Viktorsdóttir	"You Are the One"	Haraldur G. Ásmundsson, Kolbrún Eva Viktorsdóttir
Matthías Matthíasson	"Out of Sight"	Matthías Stefánsson
Menn ársins	"Gefst ekki upp"	Haraldur Vignir Sveinbjörnsson, Sváfnir Sigurðarson
Sigrún Vala Baldursdóttir	"I Believe in Angels"	Halldór Guðjónsson, Ronald Kerst
Sigurjón Brink	"Waterslide"	Sigurjón Brink
Sigurjón Brink	"You Knocked Upon My Door"	Jóhannes Kári Kristinsson
Steinarr Logi Nesheim	"Every Word"	Steinarr Logi Nesheim

==== Semi-finals ====
The three semi-finals took place on 9, 16 and 23 January 2010. In each semi-final five acts presented their entries, and the top two entries voted upon solely by public televoting proceeded to the final. The shows also featured guest performances by Ingó and 2009 Icelandic Eurovision entrant Yohanna in the first semi-final. Yohanna and Ingó covered the 2000 Icelandic Eurovision entry "Tell Me!" and the song "It Ain't Me Babe".

Semi-final 1 – 9 January 2010
R/O	Artist	Song	Result
1	Íris Hólm	"The One"	Qualified
2	Matthías Matthíasson	"Out of Sight"	Qualified
3	Sigurjón Brink	"You Knocked Upon My Door"	—N/a
4	Kolbrún Eva Viktorsdóttir	"You Are the One"	—N/a
5	Karen Pálsdóttir	"In the Future"	—N/a

Semi-final 2 – 16 January 2010
R/O	Artist	Song	Result
1	Menn ársins	"Gefst ekki upp"	—N/a
2	Hvanndalsbræður	"Gleði og glens"	Qualified
3	Sigrún Vala Baldursdóttir	"I Believe in Angels"	—N/a
4	Jógvan Hansen	"One More Day"	Qualified
5	Edgar Smári Atlason	"Now and Forever"	—N/a

Semi-final 3 – 23 January 2010
R/O	Artist	Song	Result
1	Arnar Jónsson	"Þúsund stjörnur"	—N/a
2	Sigurjón Brink	"Waterslide"	Qualified
3	Hera Björk	"Je ne sais quoi"	Qualified
4	Steinarr Logi Nesheim	"Every Word"	—N/a
5	Anna Hlín	"Komdu á morgun til mín"	—N/a

==== Final ====
The final took place on 6 February 2010 where the six entries that qualified from the preceding three semi-finals competed. After a first round of televoting, "Je ne sais quoi" performed by Hera Björk and "One More Day" by Jógvan Hansen were selected to go against each other for a "superfinal". The winner of the two, selected solely by televoting, was "Je ne sais quoi"; the placings of the other four songs were not revealed. Björk's prior Eurovision exposure included providing backing vocals for the Icelandic entries in 2008 and 2009, and placing second in Denmark's 2009 national final Dansk Melodi Grand Prix 2009 with the song "Someday". "Je ne sais quoi" was cowritten by Björk and Örlygur Smári, the latter of whom had previously written Eurovision entries for Iceland in 1997, 2000 and 2008. In addition to the performances of the competing artists, the show was opened by a medley featuring 1997 Icelandic Eurovision entrant Páll Óskar, 1999 and 2005 Icelandic Eurovision entrant Selma, and 2008 Icelandic Eurovision entrant Euroband covering past Eurovision entries, while the interval acts featured guest performances by Haffi Haff and Yohanna.

Final – 6 February 2010
R/O	Artist	Song	Place
1	Íris Hólm	"The One"	—
2	Matthías Matthíasson	"Out of Sight"	—
3	Hvanndalsbræður	"Gleði og glens"	—
4	Jógvan Hansen	"One More Day"	2
5	Sigurjón Brink	"Waterslide"	—
6	Hera Björk	"Je ne sais quoi"	1

=== Promotion ===
To promote the entry, a music video for "Je ne sais quoi" was released on 30 April 2010, and the song served as a title track of Björk's album Je ne sais quoi, which was released on 18 May, days before the contest. Amongst the 12 tracks, the album contained four versions of the song, including Eurovision, ballad, French-language and sing-along. Björk performed the song live at the UKeurovision Preview Party in London on 2 May, and also attended a party in Norway on 20 May at the home of Iceland's ambassador to Norway, where she performed both the ballad and Eurovision versions of the song. In an interview with ESC Radio, Björk noted that the ongoing eruption of the Eyjafjallajökull volcano at the time brought additional awareness to Iceland, and indirectly to her entry. She would later be seen holding a smoking volcano prop in the green room of the contest.

== At Eurovision ==
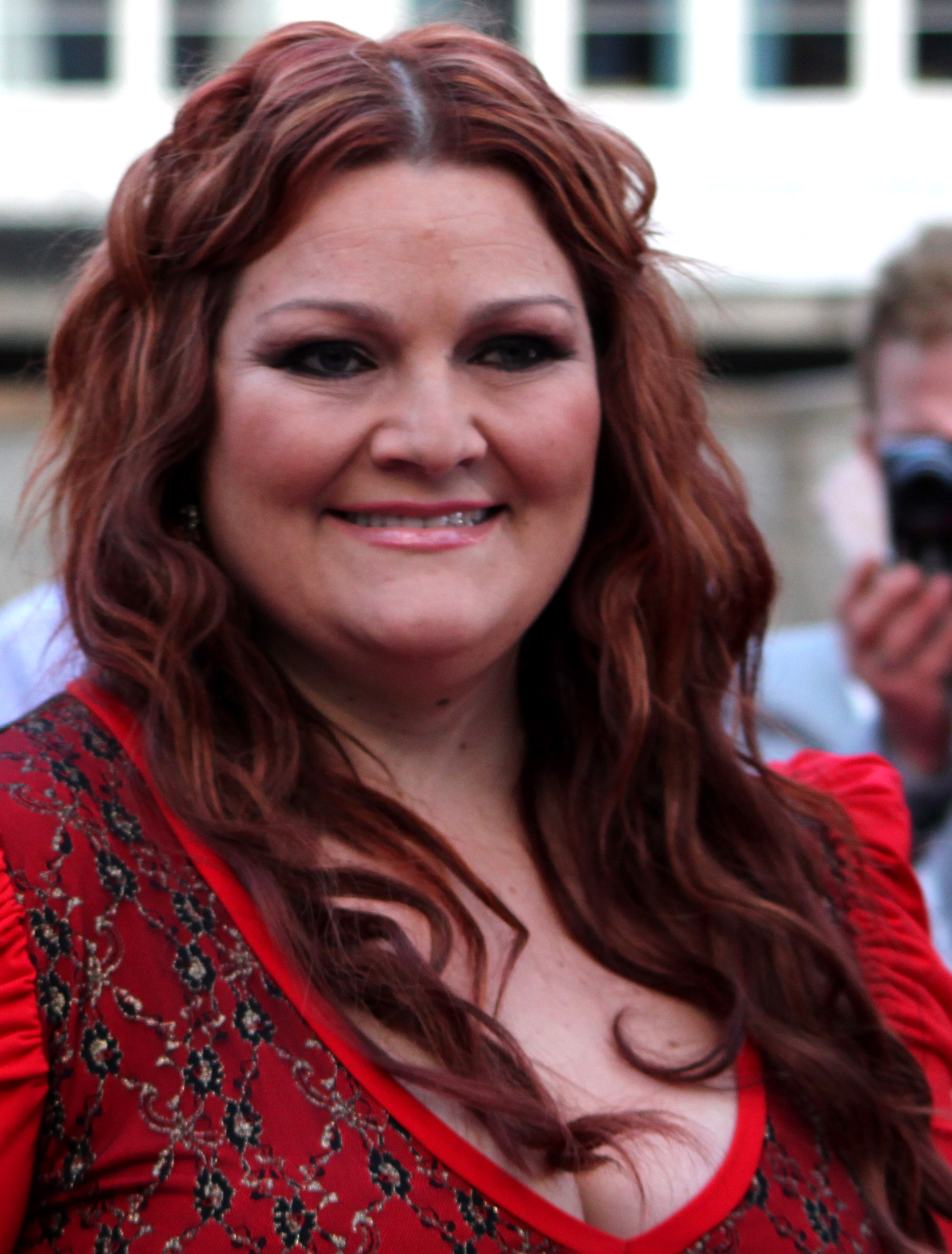
Hera Björk at the Eurovision Opening Party in Oslo

The Eurovision Song Contest 2010 took place at Telenor Arena in Oslo, Norway, and consisted of two semi-finals held on 25 and 27 May, respectively, and the final on 29 May 2010. According to the Eurovision rules, all participating countries, except the host nation and the "Big Four", consisting of France, Germany, Spain and the United Kingdom, were required to qualify from one of the two semi-finals to compete for the final, although the top 10 countries from the respective semi-final progress to the final. The European Broadcasting Union (EBU) split up the competing countries into five different pots based on voting patterns from previous contests evaluated by Digame, in order to decrease the influence of neighbour and diaspora voting. On 7 February 2010, an allocation draw was held which placed each country into one of the two semi-finals and determined which half of the show they would perform in. Iceland was placed into the first semi-final, to be held on 25 May 2010, and was scheduled to perform in the second half of the show. The running order for the semi-finals was decided through another draw on 23 March 2010 with the nation set to perform last (17th), following the entry from Belarus. The two semi-finals and the final were broadcast in Iceland on RÚV with commentary by Sigmar Guðmundsson.

=== Performances ===
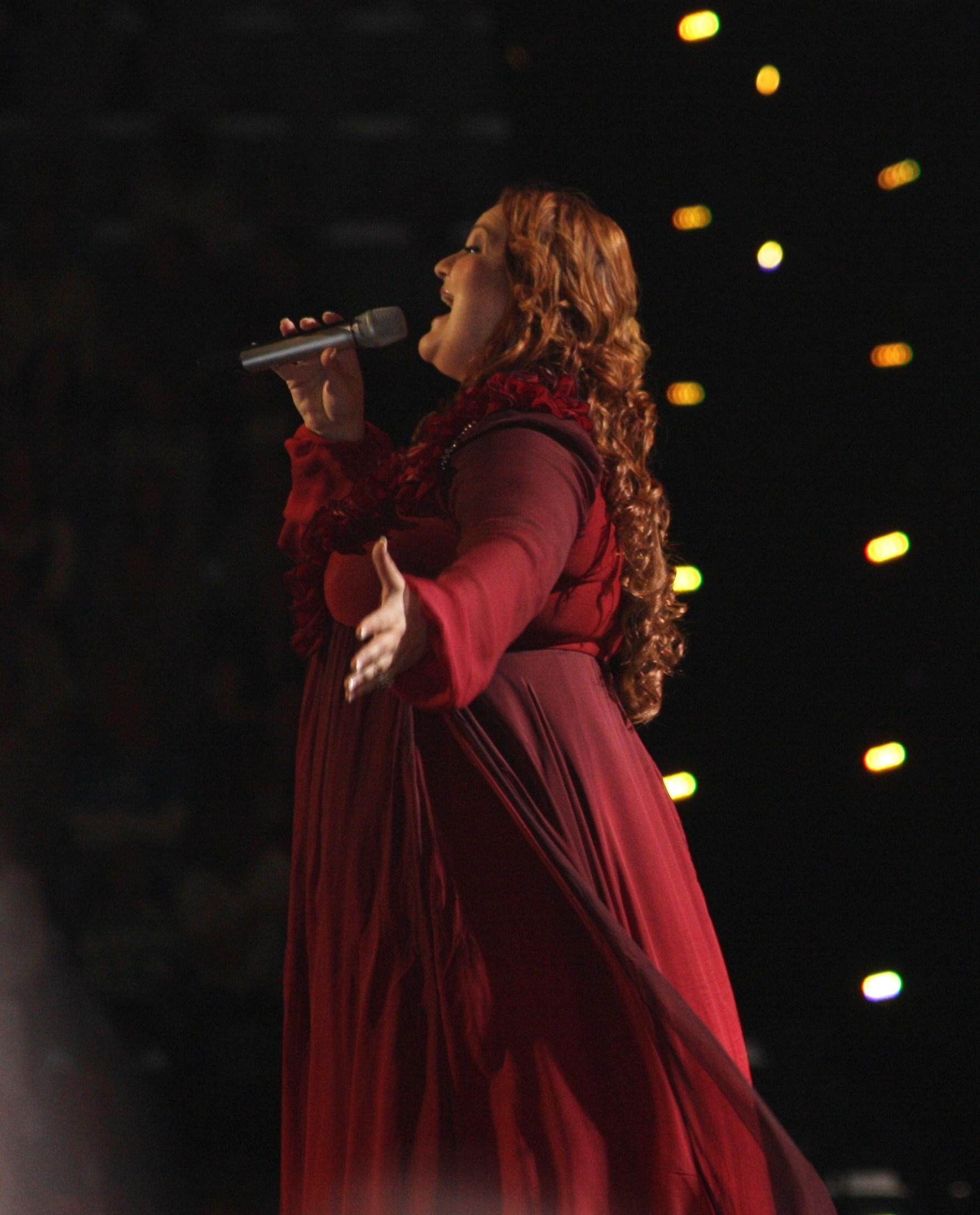
Hera Björk during a rehearsal before the first semi-final

Hera Björk took part in technical rehearsals on 17 and 21 May, followed by dress rehearsals on 24 and 25 May. This included the jury show on 24 May where the professional juries of each country watched and voted on the competing entries. On the day of the first semi-final, Iceland was considered by bookmakers to be the third most likely country to advance into the final. The Icelandic performance featured Björk in a wine red dress designed by Uniform, joined on stage by three female and two male backing vocalists dressed in red and black outfits. The female backing vocalists also performed choreography with Björk during the performance. The stage backdrop displayed a starry night sky with a purple hue which later transitioned into blue, red and yellow pulsating lights with quick flickering intervals. In speaking about her stage performance, Björk remarked that "The red colour of the dress is just my colour. I had a vision about four years ago with me standing on a big stage in a flowing red dress with lots of flags, and I'm staying true to that vision with this dress." The backing vocalists that joined Björk were: Erna Hrönn Ólafsdóttir, Heiða Ólafsdóttir, Kristján Gíslason, Kristjana Stefánsdóttir and Pétur Örn Guðmundsson. Kristján Gíslason previously represented Iceland in 2001 as part of Two Tricky.

At the end of the first semi-final, held on 25 May, Iceland was announced as having finished in the top 10, subsequently qualifying for the final. It was later revealed that Iceland had placed third in the semi-final, receiving a total of 112 points. Shortly after the first semi-final, a winners' press conference was held for the ten qualifying countries. As part of this press conference, the qualifying artists took part in a draw to determine the running order for the final. This draw was done in the order the countries were announced during the semi-final. Iceland was drawn to perform in position 16, following the entry from Albania and preceding the entry from Ukraine. In the following days, Björk once again took part in dress rehearsals on 28 and 29 May, including the jury final where the professional juries cast their final votes before the live show. Björk then performed a repeat of her semi-final performance during the final on 29 May. At the end of the contest, Iceland placed nineteenth in the final, scoring 41 points.

=== Voting ===
Voting during the three shows involved each country awarding points from 1–8, 10 and 12 as determined by a combination of 50% national jury and 50% televoting. Each nation's jury consisted of five music industry professionals who are citizens of the country they represent. This jury judged each entry based on: vocal capacity; the stage performance; the song's composition and originality; and the overall impression by the act. In addition, no member of a national jury was permitted to be related in any way to any of the competing acts in such a way that they cannot vote impartially and independently.

Following the release of the full split voting by the EBU after the conclusion of the competition, it was revealed that Iceland had placed fifteenth with the public televote and nineteenth with the jury vote in the final. In the public vote, Iceland scored 40 points, while with the jury vote, Iceland scored 57 points. In the first semi-final, Iceland placed second with the public televote with 149 points and sixth with the jury vote, scoring 85 points.

Below is a breakdown of points awarded to Iceland and awarded by Iceland in the first semi-final and final of the contest. The nation awarded its 12 points to Belgium in the semi-final and to Denmark in the final of the contest. It received 12 points from Belgium in the semi-final, while its highest point award in the final was 8 points, also from Belgium. The Icelandic spokesperson, who announced the Icelandic votes during the final, was Yohanna who had previously represented Iceland in 2009.

==== Points awarded to Iceland ====
Points awarded to Iceland (Semi-final 1)
Score	Country
12 points	Belgium
10 points	Malta; Moldova; Poland
8 points	Albania; Greece; Russia
7 points	Estonia; Finland; Slovakia; Spain
6 points	Belarus; Germany; Portugal
5 points	France
4 points	
3 points	Serbia
2 points	Latvia
1 point	Macedonia

Points awarded to Iceland (Final)
Score	Country
12 points	
10 points	
8 points	Belgium
7 points	
6 points	Malta; Norway
5 points	Finland
4 points	Estonia; Germany
3 points	Denmark; Greece
2 points	Belarus
1 point	

==== Points awarded by Iceland ====
Points awarded by Iceland (Semi-final 1)
Score	Country
12 points	Belgium
10 points	Albania
8 points	Greece
7 points	Portugal
6 points	Finland
5 points	Slovakia
4 points	Malta
3 points	Serbia
2 points	Estonia
1 point	Macedonia

Points awarded by Iceland (Final)
Score	Country
12 points	Denmark
10 points	Belgium
8 points	Greece
7 points	Albania
6 points	France
5 points	Romania
4 points	Azerbaijan
3 points	Germany
2 points	Georgia
1 point	Portugal
