= Our Choice (song) =

2018 song by Ari Ólafsson

Single by Ari Ólafsson
- Released: 20 January 2018
- Length: 3:00
- Label: Ríkisútvarpið
- Composer(s): Þórunn Erna Clausen
- Lyricist(s): Þórunn Erna Clausen

Ari Ólafsson singles chronology
"Our Choice" (2018)	"Ég man" (2022)

Music video
- "Our Choice" on YouTube

Eurovision Song Contest 2018 entry
- Country: Iceland
- Artist(s): Ari Ólafsson
- Language: English
- Composer(s): Þórunn Erna Clausen
- Lyricist(s): Þórunn Erna Clausen

Finals performance
- Semi-final result: 19th
- Semi-final points: 15

Entry chronology
- ◄ "Paper" (2017)
- "Hatrið mun sigra" (2019) ►

Official performance video
- "Our Choice" (First Semi-Final) on YouTube

"Our Choice", originally released as "Heim" (Icelandic: [heiːm]; transl. "Home"), is a song by Icelandic singer Ari Ólafsson. It represented Iceland in the Eurovision Song Contest 2018 in Lisbon, Portugal, after winning Söngvakeppnin 2018, the Icelandic national final for the contest. The song competed in the first semi-final, where it failed to qualify, finishing last (19th) with only 15 points.

== Composition ==
The song is considered a slow, orchestral ballad. The song brings a message of wanting to bring peace and love in order to have an unprejudiced and united world, saying that it's up for society to make "our choice".

== Eurovision Song Contest ==
=== Söngvakeppnin 2018 ===
Söngvakeppnin 2018 was the national final format developed by RÚV in order to select Iceland's entry for the Eurovision Song Contest 2018. Twelve songs in total competed in Söngvakeppnin 2018 where the winner was determined after two semi-finals and a final. Six songs competed in each semi-final on 10 and 17 February 2018. The top three songs from each semi-final, as determined by public televoting qualified to the final which took place on 3 March 2018. The rules stated that a jury was going to select a wildcard act for the final out of the remaining non-qualifying acts from both semi-finals, however, it was later decided that a wildcard would be unnecessary. The winning entry in the final was determined over two rounds of voting: the first to select the top two via 50/50 public televoting and jury voting and the second to determine the winner with 100% televoting. All songs were required to be performed in Icelandic during the semi-final portion of the competition. In the final, the song was required to be performed in the language that the artist intended to perform in at the Eurovision Song Contest in Lisbon. In addition to selecting the Icelandic entry for Eurovision, a monetary prize of 3 million Icelandic króna was awarded to the songwriters responsible for the winning entry.

The Icelandic version of the song, "Heim", competed in the first semi-final on 10 February 2018, and was announced as one of the three qualifiers from the semi-final.

The final took place on 3 March 2018 where the six entries that qualified from the preceding two semi-finals competed. The song was changed to English for the final. In the first round of voting, votes from a seven-member international and Icelandic jury panel (50%) and public televoting (50%) determined the top two entries. The top two entries advanced to a second round of voting, the superfinal, where the winner, "Our Choice" performed by Ari Ólafsson, was determined solely by televoting.

=== At Eurovision ===
According to Eurovision rules, all nations with the exceptions of the host country and the "Big Five" (France, Germany, Italy, Spain and the United Kingdom) are required to qualify from one of two semi-finals in order to compete for the final; the top ten countries from each semi-final progress to the final. The European Broadcasting Union (EBU) split up the competing countries into six different pots based on voting patterns from previous contests, with countries with favourable voting histories put into the same pot. On 29 January 2018, a special allocation draw was held which placed each country into one of the two semi-finals, as well as which half of the show they would perform in. Iceland was placed into the first semi-final, to be held on 8 May 2018, and was scheduled to perform in the first half of the show.

The Icelandic performance featured Ari Ólafsson dressed in a white suit and with a red turtleneck underneath, joined on stage by five backing vocalists dressed in red and black outfits. The stage lighting transitioned from blue to red and gold colours. The performance was described as "simplistic", and compared the performance to 1987 Irish Eurovision Song Contest entrant Johnny Logan Eurovision performance of "Hold Me Now". According to Ólafsson, the suit was made to represent the complexity of life, with him saying "the red is the lava underneath and the rest, the ice underneath. It represents like complicated pain: the stories that we have like pain, love and sorrow."

At the first semi final of the Eurovision Song Contest 2018, the song was performed second in the running order, following Azerbaijan, and preceding Albania. The song received 15 points from the jury vote, but none from the public televote, placing 19th and failing to qualify for the final.

== Critical reception ==
Reception to "Our Choice" was mainly negative. On Icelandic TV show Alla Leið, a show previewing the Eurovision Song Contest, panelists Friðrik Dór Jónsson and Helga Möller both criticized the song heavily, saying that the song was outdated, boring, and had no chance to qualify from the semi-final.
