= Þórunn Erna Clausen =

Icelandic actress and songwriter (born 1975)

- Born: 12 September 1975 (age 51); Reykjavík, Iceland
- Occupation: Actress
- Years active: 1995–present
- Spouse: Sigurjón Brink (m.2008; died 2011)
- Father: Haukur Clausen

Þórunn Erna Clausen (born 12 September 1975) is an Icelandic actress and songwriter.

Clausen is the daughter of Olympic athlete and dentist Haukur Clausen. She studied drama at the Webber Douglas Academy of Dramatic Art in London and graduated in 2001.

In 2004, Clausen won an Edda Award for her supporting role in the Icelandic film, Dís.

Clausen is widow of the musician Sjonni Brink who together composed "Coming Home", Iceland's entry to the Eurovision Song Contest 2011. Brink died before his first performance in the third semi-final of Söngvakeppni Sjónvarpsins 2011. Clausen has also written entries for Iceland's selections in 2012, 2014, 2016, 2017 and 2018, with her song, "Our Choice", sung by Ari Ólafsson winning Söngvakeppnin 2018, therefore heading to the Eurovision Song Contest 2018.

== Filmography ==
=== Film ===
Year	Title	Role	Notes
1999	Citizen Cam	Tessa Thorleitsdottir	
2002	A Man Like Me	Kynlífsstelpa	
2004	Dís	Magga	
2007	Lítið land		
2008	Fjölskylda		

=== Television ===
Year	Title	Role	Notes
2015	Documentary Now!	Nina Karlsdóttir	Episode: "A Town, a Gangster, a Festival"
2015	Réttur	Indiana's mother	2 episodes
