= Jógvan Hansen =

Faroese musician

Jógvan Hansen (Faroese pronunciation: [ˈjɛkvan ˈhan̥ːsɛn]; born 28 December 1978 in Klaksvík, Faroe Islands) is a Faroese singer, musician (violinist and guitar player) and actor who won the first ever Icelandic version of The X Factor in 2007 with 70% of the popular vote. His album Rooftop and the title single were #1 in Iceland. Prior to his solo career, he was in the music formations Aria and Kular Røtur

== Career ==
=== Early days ===
In Aria

Jógvan Hansen was trained in classical violin playing for nine years and was the lead singer in a band called Aria that released a CD in 1998 entitled After These Messages, which went straight to the top of the charts on the Faroe Islands.

In Kular Røtur

From 1999, he was in the children's concept Kular Røtur (Cool Roots) and released with them three CDs and two videotapes. One of the CDs became the best selling album in the last 20 years on the Faroe Islands.

=== 2007: X-Factor Winner ===
In the year 2006, while he was working as a hair stylist, he took part in The X Factor song contest in Iceland. He eventually won the title by 70% of the voting. The series was broadcast in 2006-2007 by Icelandic Stöð 2 television station. He performed in Icelandic and English.

=== Söngvakeppni Sjónvarpsins ===
Jógvan Hansen participated in Söngvakeppni Sjónvarpsins 2009 with the song "I Think The World of You", placing fourth and in Söngvakeppni Sjónvarpsins 2010 with the song "One More Day", placing second. In 2011, he participated in the Eurovision Song Contest of Iceland again and made it to the final, but he didn't win it, the song was called "Ég lofa". In January 2013 he participated in the semi-final at the Eurovision Song Contest 2013 in Iceland. He and Stefanía Svavarsdóttir were singing the song "Til þín". They made it to the final round, which was held on 2 February 2013, seven songs competed. Their song didn't win.

== Discography ==
=== Albums ===
In Aria

- 1998: After These Messages

in Kular Røtur

- 1999: Kular Røtur
- 2000: Túsund smíl - Kular Røtur 2
- 2002: Kular Røtur og Trøllapætur

Solo

- 2007: Jógvan - Rooftop

Joint

- 2009: Vinalög (with Friðrik Ómar)
- 2011: "Barnalög" (with Friðrik Ómar)
- 2012: "Jólin alls staðar" (with Regína Ósk Guðrún Árný and Guðrún Gunnars)

=== Singles ===
- 1998: "Rock í Føroyum - Shadow of a doubht" (with Aria)
- 2000: "Hesi sníð" (Vælskapt brek)
- 2000: "Eitt sunnukvøld í plantasjuni" (Kenna tit Rasmus)
- 2008: "Celia" (Popplist)
- 2009: "Minnir ið fløva" (Duett with Linda Andrews)
- 2009: "Do you believe" (Sumarstjórnur)
- 2010: "Save it for a rainy day" (SD)
- 2014: "Hvør skuldi gamlar gøtur gloymt" (with Flamma Auld Lang Syne)

Söngvakeppni Sjónvarpsins (Eurovision selection) song

- 2009: "I Think The World of You" (4th in Söngvakeppni Sjónvarpsins 2009)
- 2010: "One More Day" (2nd in Söngvakeppni Sjónvarpsins 2010)
- 2011, "Ég lofa" (in Söngvakeppni Sjónvarpsins 2011)
- 2013: "Til þín" (with Stefanía Svavarsdóttir) (in Söngvakeppni Sjónvarpsins 2013)
