= Magni Ásgeirsson =

Icelandic musician (born 1978)

Guðmundur Magni Ásgeirsson
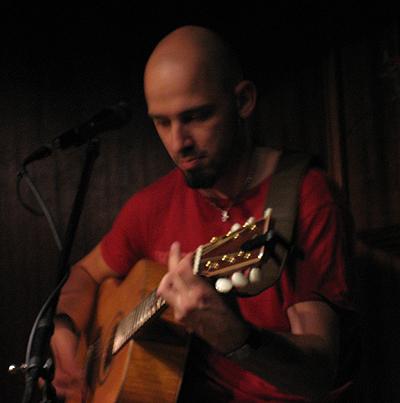
- Magni in 2007

Background information
- Also known as: Magni Ásgeirsson; Magni
- Born: Guðmundur Magni Ásgeirsson; 1 December 1978 (age 47); Egilsstaðir, Iceland
- Genres: Rock; pop
- Instruments: Vocals; guitar; bass guitar; piano
- Years active: 1997–present
- Label: Spectra Records
- Member of: Á Móti Sól

Guðmundur Magni Ásgeirsson (born 1 December 1978 in Egilsstaðir, Iceland), known professionally as Magni Ásgeirsson, is a singer, songwriter, and musician. He is also currently the frontman for the Icelandic pop band Á Móti Sól. Outside of Iceland, he is most famous for being a contestant on the CBS reality show Rock Star: Supernova.

== Biography ==
The third of four children, Magni was born in a small town in eastern Iceland. He lived on a farm in the village of Borgarfjörður eystri. He was infatuated with music and performing at an early age, and started his first band with his friends and cousins at the age of 11.

By the time he was 15 years old, he was already performing on stage. As a teenager at Menntaskólin á Egilsstöðum, he used the school's musical facilities to hone his skills as a musician. During his years at the school he participated twice at the Icelandic High School Music Competition.

In Á Móti Sól

In 1999, Magni moved to Reykjavík to become lead singer for the band Á Móti Sól after they recruited him.

Á Móti Sól became one of the biggest pop bands in Iceland, producing ten albums, 5 of which went gold or platinum. Magni has also performed duets with other Icelandic pop and rock stars and contributed to various other projects.

== Rock Star: Supernova ==
Magni was virtually unknown outside of Iceland until he competed on the U.S.-produced music television show, Rock Star: Supernova, in the summer of 2006 where he earned himself the nickname of "Ice-Man". He distinguished himself on the show with consistently solid vocal performances and his rapport with the show's House Band, as commented upon by the show's judges and host. Magni made it to the show's season finale, finishing fourth, behind Dilana (second) and Toby Rand (third), and new Rock Star Supernova frontman Lukas Rossi. A homecoming celebration took place at Smáralind on 17 September 2006, when Magni returned to Iceland after his three-month stint with the CBS show. An estimated 8,000 people welcomed Magni home.

== Work ==
On 30 November and 1 December 2006, Magni presented and performed with the Rock Star: Supernova House Band, and fellow Rock Star contestants Dilana, Toby Rand, Storm Large and Josh Logan at two concerts in Reykjavík, Iceland to celebrate his birthday. The concerts were named Best Concert of 2006 at the FM957 Listener's Awards in Iceland; Magni himself also won the Best Male Singer 2006 award.

Magni, along with one of his brothers, presents the Bræðslan festival near his hometown of Borgarfjörður Eystri annually during the last weekend of July. The festival has featured performances by top Icelandic artists including Megas and Paul Oscar (Páll Óskar); and international acts including the Scottish band, Belle & Sebastian, and the Irish singer-songwriter, Damien Rice. Iceland's President and First Lady presented Bræðslan with the 2010 Eyrarrós award for excellence in culture in a rural area.

Magni continues to perform with Á Móti Sól at shows throughout Iceland. In November 2006, the band released a greatest hits album, Á Móti Sól Í 10 Ár, with two new songs and new vocals from Magni on some of the older songs. In August 2007 and 2008, Á Móti Sól was a headliner at one of Iceland's most popular music festivals in Vestmannaeyjar, and performed before a crowd of nearly 50,000 on the main stage at the 2007 Reykjavík Culture Night festival. The band released their eighth album, 8, in November 2009; six of the songs on the album were released as singles in 2008 and 2009, including "Árin," which reached number one on the Iceland radio chart, and "Til þín," for which Magni wrote the music and co-wrote the lyrics.

Magni has also occasionally performed in the U.S. and Canada since his stint on Rock Star: Supernova, including several shows as a duo with Dilana. In addition, he sang and played guitar for Dilana as an opening act on the January/February 2007 Rock Star Supernova North American tour and opening for Aerosmith at a benefit concert at Mandalay Bay in Las Vegas.

Prior to the release of his solo album, Magni posted studio versions of four English language original songs on his official MySpace and website – "See You Tonight," which he wrote while participating in Rock Star: Supernova and which is featured on his solo album; "When the Time Comes," which he performed on that show and which appears on the 2010 version of his solo album and as a bonus track on Á Móti Sól Í 10 Ár; "My Pain" and "It's Not About Us". The latter three songs were originally recorded in Icelandic.

In late 2007/early 2008, Magni and Birgitta Haukdal performed the song "Núna veit ég", written by former GusGus member Hafdís Huld Þrastardóttir, in Laugardagslögin, the Icelandic selection for the Eurovision Song Contest. The song won its qualifying and semi-final rounds, but did not win the final selection. Magni has competed before in Söngvakeppni Sjónvarpsins, performing the song "Flottur karl, Sæmi rokk," which qualified for the final as a wild card in 2006.

Magni sings the opening theme for LazyTown Extra, which first premiered in the UK in September 2008, and is a spin-off of the popular children's show, LazyTown. In addition to his work with Á Móti Sól and as a solo artist, he is also the vocalist in a Queen tribute band, called Killer Queen, that performs occasionally at clubs and events throughout Iceland.

In 2011 Magni competed in Söngvakeppni Sjónvarpsins for the third time with the song "Ég trúi á betra líf". Qualifying from its semi-final Magni came second, beaten Sigurjón's Friends in the final. In 2012 Magni will take part again in Söngvakeppni Sjónvarpsins with the song "Hugarró".

=== Solo album ===
Album cover of Magni (with original track list)

Magni has a solo album in English that was originally released on CD in Iceland on 3 August 2007 and as a digital download elsewhere in the world on 9 October 2007. The self-titled album, Magni, was recorded in Iceland and Denmark. The album reached number one on the Icelandic album chart. Magni has since signed to the American record label, Spectra Records, who will be releasing a somewhat modified version of the album on CD worldwide on June 8, 2010 in addition to digital downloads via the major digital music services, such as iTunes. It is his first solo and full-length English-language album. The 2010 version has a re-ordered track list, dropped the tracks "Creep" and "Mistake", and added "When The Time Comes".

Track list (Original release): "If I Promised You the World," "Words Unspoken," "Play with Me," "See You Tonight," "Alone," "Addicted," "Mistake," "Tear Us Apart," "You Say," "Creep," "Let Me in the Dark," "World Alone," "The Dolphin's Cry" (bonus track)

Track list (2010 release): "If I Promised You the World," "Play With Me," "When The Time Comes," "Addicted," "You Say," "Let Me in the Dark," "See You Tonight," "Alone," "Words Unspoken," "Tear Us Apart," "World Alone," "The Dolphin's Cry" (bonus track)

The first single from Magni, "If I Promised You the World," debuted on Icelandic radio on 4 July 2007 and reached number one on the Icelandic singles chart. "Addicted" and "See You Tonight" were also released as radio singles in Iceland. Magni unveiled many of the album's songs during two live performances at the Bræðslan festival in July 2007. The song, "Play With Me," was inspired by Magni's young son, Marinó, and was co-written with Marinó's mother, Eyrún Huld Haraldsdóttir. The songs "You Say" and "World Alone" date back to 1997-1998 during Magni's time with the band SHAPE; earlier recordings of both songs appear on SHAPE's 1998 Limited Edition EP.

== Personal life ==
Magni has four kids with Eyrún, Marinó (born 2005), Egill (2012), Kári (2014), and Hrafn (2018).
