= Örlygur Smári =

Icelandic producer and composer

Örlygur Smári (born 30 June 1971 (age 53)) is an Icelandic producer/composer.

== Biography ==
Smári was born in Iceland, Europe.

Smári wrote Iceland's Eurovision Song Contest 2000 entry Tell Me!. He also wrote the song This Is My Life, which was the Icelandic entry for the Eurovision Song Contest 2008.

In 2010, Smári teamed up with Hera Björk to write the song Je ne sais quoi, which represented Iceland in the Eurovision Song Contest 2010. The song performed in the first semifinal on 25 May 2010 and came in third with 123 points. In the Grand Final four days later, however, the song came in 19th place having received 41 points.

Örlygur Smári's brother is musician Beggi Smári.

In 2013 he teamed with Hera Björk again to cowrite the song "Because You Can" which won the Viña del Mar International Song Festival for Iceland.

== Entries in the Eurovision Song Contest ==
- "Tell Me!" by August & Telma, Iceland, (Eurovision Song Contest 2000), 12th place
- "This Is My Life" by Euroband, Iceland, (Eurovision Song Contest 2008), 14th place
- "Je ne sais quoi" by Hera Björk, Iceland, (Eurovision Song Contest 2010), 19th place
- "Ég á líf" by Eyþór Ingi Gunnlaugsson, Iceland, (Eurovision Song Contest 2013), 17th place

== Entries in national Eurovision pre-selections ==
- "Got No Love" by Elektra (Iceland 2009), 3rd place
