= Matthías Matthíasson =

- Also known as: Matti Matt
- Born: Matthías Matthíasson; 1975 (age 50–51)
- Origin: Dalvík, Iceland
- Genres: Rock
- Occupation: Musician
- Instruments: Vocals, guitar
- Years active: 1994–present

Matthías Matthíasson (born 1975), also known as Matti Matt, is an Icelandic musician who was a member of the bands Papar and Reggae on Ice.

He took part in the Eurovision Song Contest 2011 as the vocalist of the tribute band Sjonni's Friends and was the singing voice of Sportacus in the children's television series LazyTown.

== Life and career ==
Matthías was born in and grew up in Dalvík in northern Iceland.

In his youth, he performed in several musicals, such as Hair, and Jesus Christ Superstar, where he played Peter.

He was nominated for an Icelandic Music Award for "Best Newcomer" in 1995 for his acting in Jesus Christ Superstar.

In 1996, he was recruited by athlete Magnus Scheving to be the singing voice of Sportacus (Icelandic: Íþróttaálfurinn) in the original Icelandic LazyTown plays, Áfram Latibær! and Glanni Glæpur í Latabæ. Matthías continued this role in the LazyTown television series, where he sang Sportacus' vocals in both the English and Icelandic dubs.

In 1997, his band at the time, Dúndurfréttir, was praised by Rolling Stone as "the best Pink Floyd, Led Zeppelin cover band ever".

In 2010, he progressed to the semi-finals in the selection of the Icelandic Eurovision entrant, but ultimately lost to Hera Björk.

In 2011, he became the lead vocalist of the tribute band Sjonni's Friends, the band which represented Iceland in the Eurovision Song Contest 2011, where they performed the song "Coming Home".

== Personal life ==
Matthías has three sons with his wife, Brynja.
