= Sjonni Brink =

Icelandic musician and singer

- Also known as: Sjonni
- Born: Sigurjón Brink; 29 August 1974; Reykjavík, Iceland
- Died: 17 January 2011 (aged 36) Garðabær, Iceland
- Occupation: Singer-songwriter
- Instrument: Vocals
- Years active: 1994–2011

Sigurjón Brink (29 August 1974 – 17 January 2011), better known as Sjonni Brink or just the mononym Sjonni, was an Icelandic singer-songwriter. He was one of the founders of the Icelandic theatre group Vesturport, which received the honourable Europe Theatre Prize in St. Petersburg.

== Söngvakeppni Sjónvarpsins ==
=== Earlier competitions ===
Sjonni was a household name in Iceland and participated in Söngvakeppni Sjónvarpsins the Icelandic national selection show for the Eurovision Song Contest three times:

- 2006 with "Hjartaþrá"
- 2007 with "Áfram"
- 2010 with "You Knocked Upon My Door" and "Waterslide",

=== 2011 competition ===
Sjonni would have also participated in Söngvakeppni Sjónvarpsins 2011, with "Aftur Heim", but died before the first performance in the third semi-final. Sigurjón Brink had composed the music himself, with lyrics by his wife Þórunn Erna Clausen. Sigurjón's family decided, on reflection that they would like for the song to remain in the competition, that it should be performed by Sjonni's Friends, a tribute band consisting of Sjonni's real life musician friends Hreimur Örn Heimisson, Gunnar Ólason, Benedikt Brynleifsson, Vignir Snær Vigfússon, Matthías Matthíasson and Pálmi Sigurhjartarson. The formation won the Söngvakeppni Sjónvarpsins 2011, and the whole nation joined in grief for Sjonni's premature death. The group Sjonni's Friends (in Icelandic Vinir Sjonna) won the right to represent Iceland in the Eurovision Song Contest 2011.

The actual Eurovision competition was held in Düsseldorf, Germany in May 2011 where the formation Sjonni's Friends sang it with amended English lyrics as "Coming Home". It came 20th overall during the final of the competition after receiving 61 points.

== Death ==
During the evening of 17 January, Sigurjón died at his home in Garðabær in Iceland, after suffering a stroke. He left behind his wife and four children. Six years later, his son, Aron Brink, competed in the Icelandic national final, Söngvakeppnin 2017, with his song "Hypnotized" and finished fourth.

== Discography ==
=== Singles ===
- 2006: "Hjartaþrá" (ISL #4)
- 2007: "Áfram"
- 2007: "La Bamba" (ISL #7)
- 2008: "Flökkuhjartað"
- 2008: "Brosið þitt lýsir mér leið"
- 2010: "You Knocked Upon My Door"
- 2010: "Waterslide"

== Discography (after death) ==
=== Albums ===
- 2011: Sjonni Brink
- 2004: Flavors, Go your own way.
- 1995: with his band In Bloom.

=== Singles ===
as Sjonni's Friends

(sometimes aka Sigurjón's Friends)

- 2011: "Aftur heim" (ISL #1)
  - 2011: "Coming Home" (English version of "Aftur heim" as sung during Eurovision Song Contest 2011)
- 2011 : Reality (recorded in the summer of 2010 and released after his death, included on the Sjonni's Friends Eurovision cd.)

as Þórunn Erna Clausen & Sjonni Brink

- 2013: Days Gone By"
