= Regína Ósk =

Icelandic singer (born 1977)

Regína Ósk Óskarsdóttir
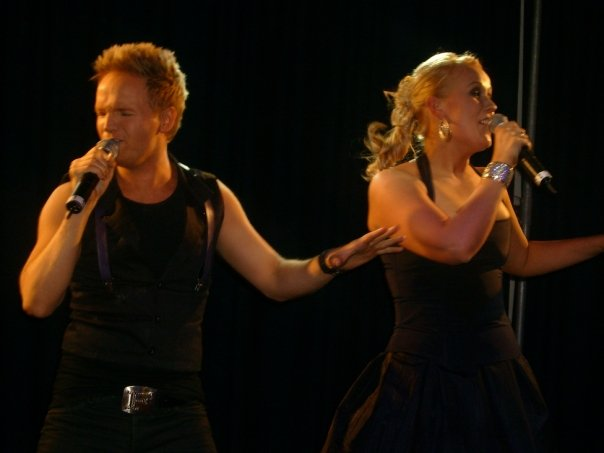
- Regína with Friðrik Ómar as Eurobandið, 2008

Background information
- Born: 21 December 1977 (age 48); Reykjavík, Iceland
- Genres: Eurodance; dance; pop; jazz
- Occupations: Singer; musician
- Instruments: Vocals; piano
- Years active: 1999–present

Regína Ósk Óskarsdóttir (born 21 December 1977, in Reykjavík) is an Icelandic singer. She has participated for Iceland in the Eurovision Song Contest in 2001, 2003, and 2005 as a backing vocal, and in 2008 as a member of Eurobandið with the song "This Is My Life". Alongside Friðrik Ómar, Regína achieved the 14th place in the final, resulting in Iceland's best showing since the Eurovision Song Contest 2003.

== Career ==
=== Early career ===
Regína Ósk Óskarsdóttir was born in Reykjavík on 21 December 1977. She has been singing and performing all her life. Regína won two song competitions in her early teens, sang solo with her school choir, and studied classical singing for a period in The Reykjavík Academy of Singing and Vocal Arts, before taking some lessons in jazz vocals. Her first band was a girl group when she was 16years old and then sung in different bands and took part in lots of shows.

=== Solo work ===
In 1999, Regína Ósk sang in the musical Little Shop of Horrors, where she met Selma Björnsdottir, who represented Iceland in the Eurovision Song Contest 1999, and the two worked together for some time after that. Regína sang backing vocals in Eurovision Song Contest in 2001, 2003, and 2005, and has done a lot of studio session work. She recorded an eponymous solo album in 2005; the second album Í djúpum dal was released in 2006 and her third album, Ef væri ég..., appeared in 2007.

She has been singing as a professional singer for 22 years and singing in big productions in Iceland in their concert hall Harpa. She has been in big concerts like ABBA tribute, Carpenters, Tina Turner, Freddie Mercury etc. She took part in the national selection "Söngvakeppni sjónvarpsins" in 2003 and in 2006 she was a runner up with the son "Þér við hlið" Then in 2008 she represented Iceland with her friend and colleague Fridrik Omar and together they were Euroband. Their song "This is my life" finished nr 14 on the final show. She has released 5 solo albums and sung in hundreds of other albums and singles with many Icelandic artists. She is performing all over Iceland in concerts and all kinds of happening. She has been working with children and teenagers for many as she runs a singing school with her career.

In 2017, the performer took part in the Gibraltar Song Festival with the song "Overload", composed by Ylva & Linda Persson and one year later, after many other projects and collaborations, released the single "Rabbit hole".

== Discography ==
=== Albums ===
- 2005: Regína Ósk
- 2006: Í djúpum dal
- 2007: Ef væri ég...
- 2008: This is my life with Euroband
- 2010: Um gleðileg jól
- 2014: Leiddu mína litlu hendi

=== Singles ===
- 2003: "Don´t try to fool me"
- 2004: "Sail on"
- 2006: "Þér við hlið"
- 2007: "Allt í himnalagi"
- 2007: "Ástfangin"
- 2008: "This is my life"
- 2010: "Kærleiksvísan"
- 2010: "Sameinaðar sálir"
- 2012: "Hjartað brennur"
- 2015: "Aldrei of seint"
- 2017: "Overload"
- 2018: "Rabbit hole"

== See also ==
- Iceland in the Eurovision Song Contest
- Iceland in the Eurovision Song Contest 2005
- Iceland in the Eurovision Song Contest 2008

Preceded by Eiríkur Hauksson with "Valentine Lost"	Iceland in the Eurovision Song Contest; 2008 (as part of Euroband)	Succeeded by Yohanna with "Is It True?"
