= Congratulations (Silvía Night song) =

2006 song by Silvia Night

Single by Silvía Night
- Released: 2006
- Composer: Þorvaldur Bjarni Þorvaldsson
- Lyricist: Silvia Night

Eurovision Song Contest 2006 entry
- Country: Iceland
- Artist: Ágústa Eva Erlendsdóttir
- As: Silvía Night
- Language: English
- Composer: Þorvaldur Bjarni Þorvaldsson
- Lyricist: Silvia Night

Finals performance
- Semi-final result: 13th
- Semi-final points: 62

Entry chronology
- ◄ "If I Had Your Love" (2005)
- "Valentine Lost" (2007) ►

"Congratulations", sometimes known by its Icelandic title of "Til hamingju Ísland" (Icelandic: [tʰɪl̥ ˈhaːmɪɲcʏ ˈistlant]; transl. "Congratulations Iceland"), is a song by Silvía Night. It represented Iceland in the Eurovision Song Contest 2006.

== Composition ==
Composed by Þorvaldur Bjarni Þorvaldsson and with lyrics written by the fictional character singing it, the song generated considerable controversy at the contest. The lyrics are essentially in praise of the wisdom of the Icelandic voters in selecting Silvía to represent them in the first place. She sings, for example, "so congratulations, I have arrived / I'm Silvía Night and I'm shining so bright / Eurovision nation, your dream's coming true / you've been waiting and waiting for me to save you", thus contending that the other entries of that year are things to be saved from. Silvía's song, on the other hand, is described as being "hot, okay, really not too gay". The Icelandic original continued this theme further, with one line running "congratulations Iceland, that I was born here". Silvía also sings "let's meet next year in Iceland", a reference to the contest tradition of hosting rights going to the previous year's winner.

== Eurovision Song Contest ==
=== Söngvakeppni Sjónvarpsins 2006 ===
Söngvakeppni Sjónvarpsins 2006 was the national final format developed by RÚV in order to select Iceland's entry for the Eurovision Song Contest 2006. Twenty-four songs in total competed in Söngvakeppni Sjónvarpsins 2006 where the winner was determined after three semi-finals and a final. Eight songs competed in each semi-final on 21 January, 28 January and 4 February 2006. The top four songs from each semi-final qualified to the final which took place on 3 February 2007. The results of the semi-finals and final were determined by 100% public televoting, while two wildcard acts were selected by a jury for the final out of the fifth-placed acts from each of the semi-finals. All songs were required to be performed in Icelandic during all portions of the competition, however, it was decided that the language choice would be up to the winning composers to decide the language that will be performed at the Eurovision Song Contest in Athens.

On 30 October 2005, RÚV opened the submission period for interested songwriters to submit their entries until the deadline on 18 November 2005. Songwriters were required to be Icelandic or possess Icelandic citizenship. At the close of the submission deadline, 226 entries were received. A selection committee was formed in order to select the top twenty-four entries. The twenty-four competing songs were revealed by the broadcaster during a press conference on 13 December 2005, while their artists were revealed on 16, 17 and 20 January 2006.

"Til hamingju Ísland" competed in the third semi-final, and was announced as one of five qualifiers.

The final took place on 18 February 2006 where the fifteen entries that qualified from the preceding three semi-finals competed. "Til hamingju Ísland" would win the final with 70,190 votes, winning by over 40,000 votes. As a result, the song would go on to represent Iceland in the Eurovision Song Contest 2006.

=== At Eurovision ===
As Iceland had not qualified for the final at the 2005 contest, the song had to compete in the semi-final. Here, it was performed twenty-third, following Bosnia and Herzegovina's Hari Mata Hari with "Lejla". At the close of voting, it had received 62 points, placing 13th in a field of 23 – failing to qualify for the final and thus forcing Iceland's next contest appearance to be in the semi-final.

== Charts ==
Chart (2006)	Peak position
Icelandic Singles Chart	1

Preceded by If I Had Your Love	Icelandic entry for the Eurovision Song Contest; 2006	Succeeded by Valentine Lost
