= Friðrik Ómar =

Icelandic singer (born 1981)

Friðrik Ómar Hjörleifsson
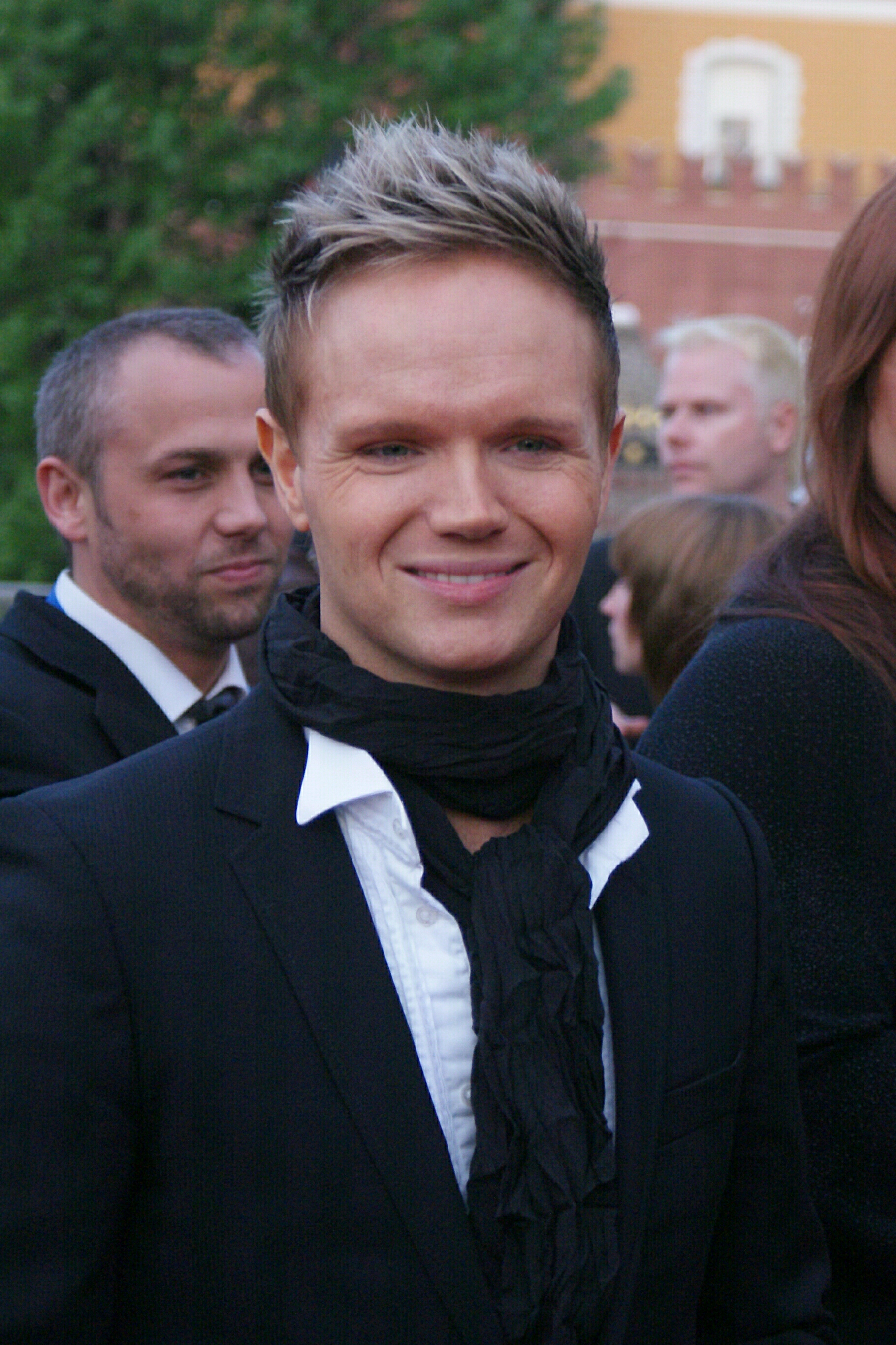
- Friðrik Ómar in 2009

Background information
- Born: 4 October 1981 (age 44); Akureyri, Iceland
- Occupation: Singer
- Instrument: Vocals
- Label: Rigg
- Website: Instagram: fromarinn

Friðrik Ómar Hjörleifsson (born 4 October 1981) is an Icelandic singer best known for representing Iceland in the Eurovision Song Contest 2008 as part of Eurobandið as lead vocals.

== Career ==
Friðrik Ómar was born in Akureyri. He began playing drums at the age of five but was later asked to sing at a festival for his school, his first performance with an audience other than his mother. Impressing the crowd, he then went on to win many competitions in his hometown and made the decision to be a singer. He has worked with some of most successful artists in Iceland. In 2006, he released his debut solo album Annan dag and was nominated as "singer of the year" at the Icelandic Music Awards. In March 2006, he joined forces with fellow Icelandic singer Regína Ósk to form the band Eurobandið. During 2007 Friðrik Ómar came second in the Icelandic finals of the Eurovision Song Contest 2007 performing his song "Eldur". In Belgrade, Serbia at Eurovision Song Contest 2008, Friðrik Ómar and Eurobandið performed their song "This Is My Life". They came in 8th place in the semi-finals and 14th in the finals, providing Iceland's best result since Eurovision Song Contest 2003. Friðrik Ómar once again participated in the Eurovision Song Contest 2009 as a backing-vocalist in the Icelandic entry performed by Yohanna which placed 2nd. In 2019, he once again came second in the Icelandic finals of the Eurovision Song Contest with the song "Hvað ef ég get ekki elskað?".

== Discography ==
=== Guðrún Gunnars og Friðrik Ómar ===
- Ég skemmti mér (2005)
- Ég skemmti mér í sumar (2006)
- Ég skemmti mér um jólin (2007)

=== Solo ===
- Jólasalat (1997)
- Hegg ekki af mér Hælinn (1998)
- Annan dag (2006)
- Í minningu Vilhjálms Vilhjálmssonar (2008)
- ELVIS (2010)
- Outside The Ring (2012)
- Kveðja (2013)
- Heima um jólin (2015)
- Í fjarlægð (2023)

=== Eurobandið ===
- This Is My Life (2008)

=== Collaborations ===
- Vinalög (2009) (with Jógvan Hansen)
- Barnalög (2011) (with Jógvan Hansen)

| Preceded by Eiríkur Hauksson with "Valentine Lost" | Iceland in the Eurovision Song Contest; 2008 (as part of Euroband) | Succeeded by Yohanna with "Is It True?" |
