= Hera Björk =

Icelandic singer (born 1972)

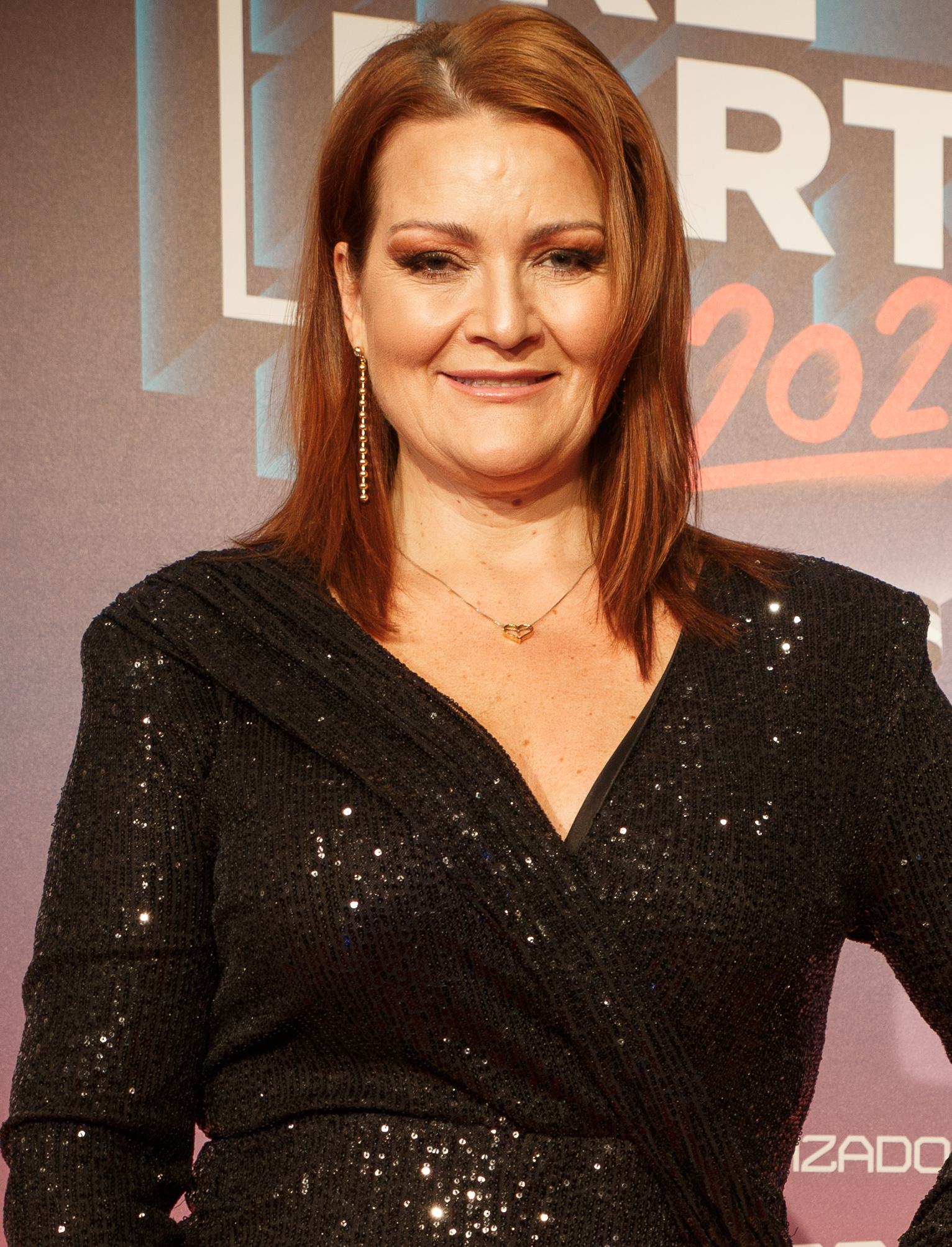
- Hera Björk in 2024

Background information
- Birth name: Hera Björk Þórhallsdóttir
- Born: 29 March 1972 (age 53); Reykjavík, Iceland
- Occupation: Singer
- Years active: 1986–present
- Labels: HandsUpMusic

Hera Björk Þórhallsdóttir (Icelandic pronunciation: [ˈhɛːra ˈpjœr̥k ˈθouːr̥halsˌtouhtɪr̥]; born 29 March 1972) is an Icelandic singer. She is known for representing Iceland in the Eurovision Song Contest 2010 with the song "Je ne sais quoi", where she finished 19th in the Grand Final, and at the Viña del Mar International Song Festival 2013 with the song "Because You Can", where she won in the Best Song category.

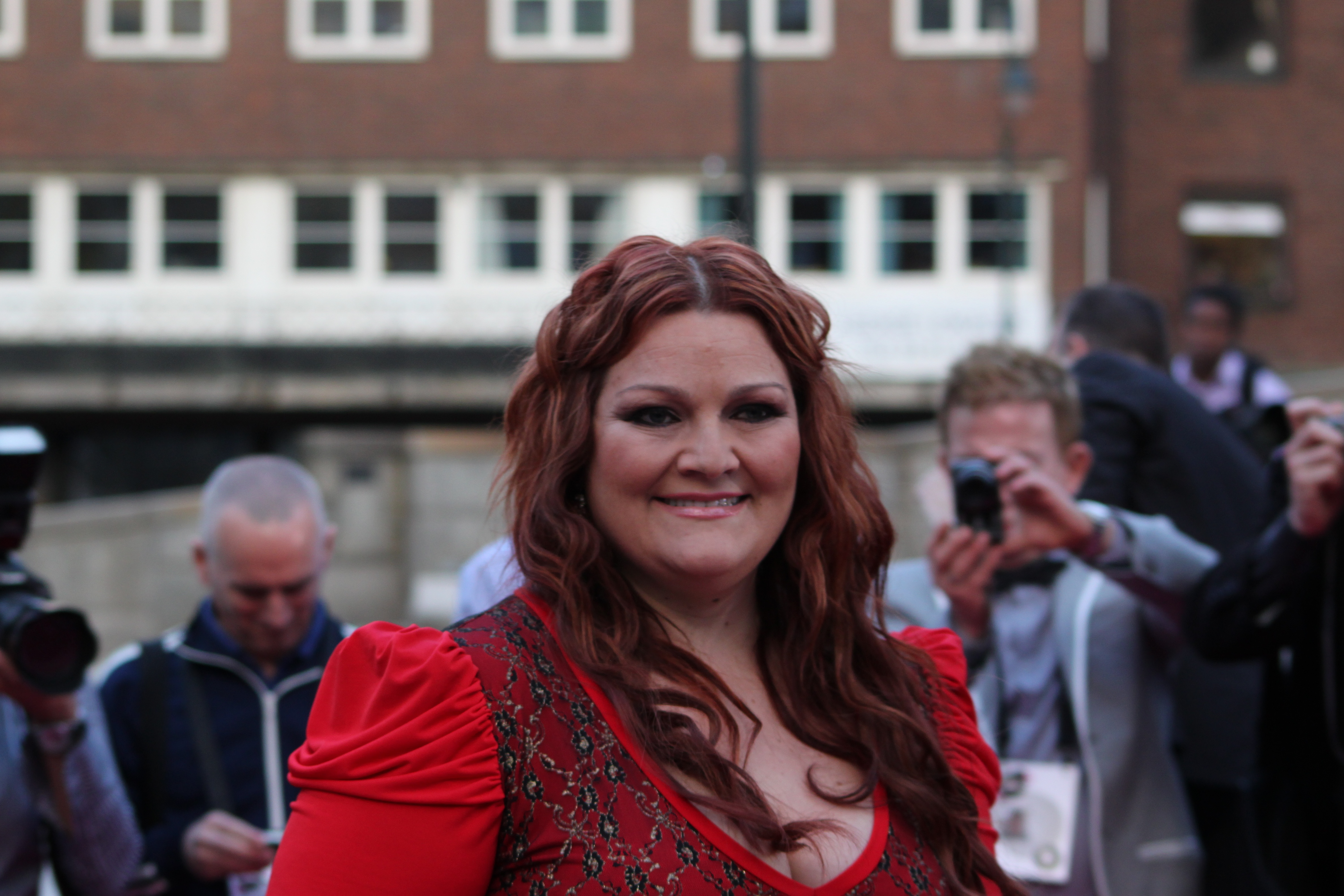
Hera Björk at the Eurovision Song Contest 2010

She was selected among the contestants of Söngvakeppnin 2024, the Icelandic national final for the Eurovision Song Contest 2024, with the song "Við förum hærra" / "Scared of Heights". She qualified for the final and won with the English version, with which she represented Iceland in the contest for a second time, failing to qualify from the first semi-final on 7 May 2024, placing 15th out of 15 with 3 points.

== Discography ==
=== Albums ===
List of albums, with selected details
Title	Details
Ilmur af Jólum	Released: 2000; Label: Hera Björk (Hera 001-2); Format: CD
Hera Björk	Released: 2006; Label: Frost (FCD 027); Format: CD
Je Ne Sais Quoi	Released: May 2010; Label: Hands Up Music (5690784020513); Format: CD, CDr, digital
Ilmur af Jólum II	Released: 2013; Label: Hands Up Music (HUM 1301); Format: CD, CDr, digital

=== Soundtracks ===
List of albums, with selected details
Title	Details
Litla Hryllingsbúðin	Released: 1999; Label: Skífan (SCD222); Format: CD

=== As part of a group ===
List of albums, with selected details
Title	Details
Dívurnar Og Tenórarnir (as part of Frostrósir)	Released: 2008; Label: FROST (FCD 039); Format: CD, CD+DVD
Heyr Himnasmiður (as part of Frostrósir)	Released: 2008; Label: FROST (FCD 040); Format: CD

=== Singles ===
Title	Year	Peak chart positions					Album
Title	Year	ICE	DEN	BEL	FIN	SWE	Album
"Engum Nema Þér" (with Friðrik Ómar)	2001	—	—	—	—	—	Landslag Bylgjunnar 2001
"Blikar, Tökum Nú Bikar" (with Vilhjálmur Goði)	2003	—	—	—	—	—	Alltaf Í Boltanum - Áfram Ísland
"Someday"	2009	—	9	—	—	—	Dansk Melodi Grand Prix 2009
"Je ne sais quoi"	2010	1	—	27	8	49	Je ne sais quoi
"Because You Can"	2010	21	—	—	—	—	Je ne sais quoi
"Finnum Astina" / "Feel the Love Tonight"	2011	—	—	—	—	—	Non-album singles
"Christmas Song" (with Chiara Siracusa)	2015	—	—	—	—	—	Non-album singles
"Queen of Effing Everything"	2016	—	—	—	—	—	Non-album singles
"Frelsisvor" (with Gissur Páll Gissurarson)	2018	—	—	—	—	—	Non-album singles
"Við förum hærra" / "Scared of Heights"	2024	22	—	—	—	—	Non-album singles
"—" denotes a recording that did not chart in that territory.

Preceded by Yohanna with "Is It True?"	Iceland in the Eurovision Song Contest; 2010	Succeeded by Sjonni's Friends with "Coming Home"
Preceded by Diljá with "Power"	Iceland in the Eurovision Song Contest; 2024	Succeeded by Væb with "Róa"
Preceded by (Sweden) Sanna Nielsen	OGAE Second Chance Contest winner 2009	Succeeded by (Sweden) Timoteij
