= Sjonni's Friends =

Icelandic tribute band

- Origin: Iceland
- Genres: Pop
- Years active: 2011
- Members: Gunnar Ólason; Vignir Snær Vigfússon; Pálmi Sigurhjartarson; Matthías Matthíasson; Hreimur Örn Heimisson; Benedikt Brynleifsson

Sjonni's Friends (Icelandic: Vinir Sjonna) were an Icelandic tribute band also known at times as Sigurjón's Friends. The band formed in early 2011 when the Icelandic singer Sjonni Brink (real name Sigurjón Brink) died just days before he was to perform his entry "Aftur heim" at Söngvakeppni Sjónvarpsins, the Icelandic national final for the Eurovision Song Contest 2011.

== Söngvakeppni Sjónvarpsins 2011 ==
On 12 February 2011, the group won the Icelandic national selection; Söngvakeppni Sjónvarpsins 2011 with the song "Aftur heim". The original artist was meant to be Sigurjón Brink himself, however on 17 January 2011 before he was set to compete in the third semi-final, Sigurjón unexpectedly died, due to natural causes, at his home in Garðabær. Sigurjón's family decided upon reflection that they would like for the song to remain in the competition, and that it should be performed by a tribute band, formed after his death, consisting of Sigurjón's musician friends.

The group made it past the first semi-final into the final, where the group won the right to represent Iceland in the Eurovision Song Contest 2011.

Band member Gunnar Ólason had previously represented Iceland in the Eurovision Song Contest 2001 as part of the band Two Tricky.

== Eurovision Song Contest 2011 ==
The actual Eurovision competition was held in Düsseldorf, Germany in May 2011 where the formation Sjonni's Friends sang "Coming Home", an English version of "Aftur heim".

The first semi-final took place in Esprit Arena in Düsseldorf on 10 May 2011. Nineteen country entries, including Iceland, took part. Sjonni's Friends performed fourteenth, finishing 4th (6th at the televoting and 3rd with the jury vote). They moved to the finals of the competition that were held on 14 May 2011 with 25 finalists taking part. They were the 21st entry to perform. They came 20th overall with 61 points.

== Members ==
Members of the band were:

- Gunnar Ólason
- Vignir Snær Vigfússon
- Pálmi Sigurhjartarson
- Matthías Matthíasson
- Hreimur Örn Heimisson
- Benedikt Brynleifsson

Some have continued with solo singing careers. Vignir Snær Vigfússon came back in 2014 to take part in Söngvakeppnin 2014, the qualification rounds for selecting Icelandic song for the Eurovision Song Contest 2014 with the song "Elsku þú", but failed to win. Matthías Matthíasson also returned in Söngvakeppnin 2020 with the song "Dreyma", but also failed to win.

== Discography ==
Sjonni's Friends

- 2011: "Aftur heim" retitled "Coming Home"

Member releases

- 2014: Vignir Snær Vigfússon - "Elsku þú"

Preceded by Hera Björk with "Je ne sais quoi"	Iceland in the Eurovision Song Contest; 2011	Succeeded by Greta Salóme and Jónsi with "Never Forget"
