= Coming Home (Sjonni's Friends song) =

2011 song by Sjonni's Friends

Single by Sjonni's Friends
- Released: 2011
- Composer: Sigurjón Brink
- Lyricist: Þórunn Erna Clausen

Eurovision Song Contest 2011 entry
- Country: Iceland
- Artists: Hreimur Örn Heimisson; Gunnar Ólason; Benedikt Brynleifsson; Vignir Snær Vigfússon; Matthías Matthíasson; Pálmi Sigurhjartarson
- As: Sjonni's Friends
- Language: English
- Composer: Sigurjón Brink
- Lyricist: Þórunn Erna Clausen

Finals performance
- Semi-final result: 4th
- Semi-final points: 100
- Final result: 20th
- Final points: 61

Entry chronology
- ◄ "Je ne sais quoi" (2010)
- "Never Forget" (2012) ►

"Coming Home" (Icelandic: "Aftur heim") is a song by the tribute band Sjonni's Friends (Icelandic: Vinir Sjonna), made up of musicians Hreimur Örn Heimisson, Gunnar Ólason, Benedikt Brynleifsson, Vignir Snær Vigfússon, Matthías Matthíasson and Pálmi Sigurhjartarson, all of whom had worked with Sjonni. It represented Iceland in the Eurovision Song Contest 2011.

The original singer, Sjonni Brink or just Sjonni (real name Sigurjón Brink) died days before the Icelandic national selection for the contest, after which his musician friends decided to form Sjonni's Friends (sometimes also known as Sigurjón's Friends) and perform the song as a tribute. It finished in 20th place in the finals with 61 points.

Brass was recorded in New York by Grammy award participant Danny Flam (of Kanye West's "All of the lights" fame) and Ron Bertolet.

== Charts ==
| Chart (2017) | Peak position |
|---|---|
| Iceland (RÚV) | 2 |
