= Eurobandið =

Icelandic musical duo

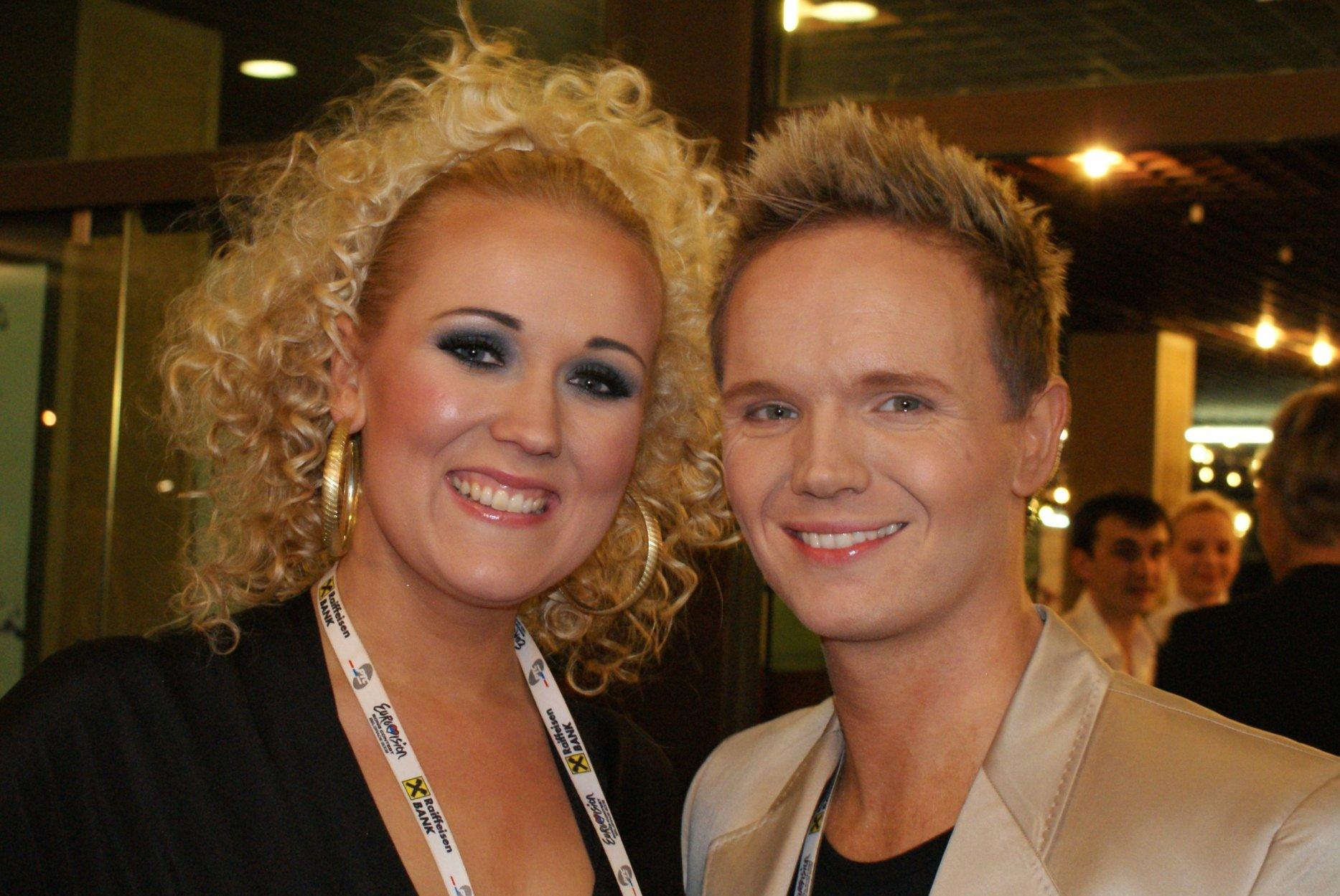
- Eurobandið in 2008

Background information
- Origin: Iceland
- Genres: Eurodance
- Years active: 2006–present
- Members: Friðrik Ómar; Regína Ósk

Eurobandið (Euroband) is the name of Icelandic technopop and dance duo Friðrik Ómar and Regína Ósk, who together represented Iceland at the Eurovision Song Contest 2008 in Belgrade, Serbia. They performed the song "This Is My Life" in the second semi-final, on 22 May 2008 which won them a place in the final on 24 May. They finished 14th out of 25 in the final with 64 points.

They have both, separately, established themselves as popular artists in Iceland and have tried to represent Iceland in Eurovision before as separate acts, but were unsuccessful. It was not until they joined that Iceland chose them as their representative in the Eurovision Song Contest 2008.

Preceded by Eiríkur Hauksson with "Valentine Lost"	Iceland in the Eurovision Song Contest; 2008	Succeeded by Yohanna with "Is It True?"
