= Je ne sais quoi (song) =

2010 single by Hera Björk

Single by Hera Björk

from the album Je Ne Sais Quoi
- Released: 2010
- Recorded: 2010
- Genre: Dance-pop, schlager, eurodance
- Length: 3:03
- Songwriters: Örlygur Smári, Hera Björk

Hera Björk singles chronology
"My Heart" (2009)	"Je ne sais quoi" (2010)

Eurovision Song Contest 2010 entry
- Country: Iceland
- Artist: Hera Björk
- Language: English
- Composers: Örlygur Smári, Hera Björk
- Lyricists: Örlygur Smári, Hera Björk

Finals performance
- Semi-final result: 3rd
- Semi-final points: 123
- Final result: 19th
- Final points: 41

Entry chronology
- ◄ "Is It True?" (2009)
- "Aftur heim" (2011) ►

"Je ne sais quoi" is an Icelandic eurodance song composed by Örlygur Smári and Hera Björk and performed by Hera Björk, and was the Icelandic entry at the Eurovision Song Contest 2010, held in Oslo, Norway on 25, 27 and 29 May 2010. The performance took place in the first semi-final on 25 May and was performed again in the final, four days later. The song is performed in English with some phrases in French (namely the phrases "Je ne sais quoi," I don't know what, and "Je ne sais pas pourquoi," I don't know why). "Je ne sais quoi" was the winner of the Söngvakeppni Sjónvarpsins 2010 contest, organised by Icelandic broadcaster Ríkisútvarpið (RÚV) to select the Icelandic entry for the contest. Despite being one of the early favorites and the fans' favorite to win the contest and finishing 3rd with 123 points in the semi-final, the song ended up finishing 19th with 41 points.

== Track list ==
Digital download

1. "Je ne sais quoi" (Eurovision 2010) original version – 3:00

Clubmix single

1. "Je ne sais quoi" clubmix – 3:51

7th Heaven remix single

1. "Je ne sais quoi" (7th Heaven remix) – 6:01

Soulshaker club mix single

1. "Je ne sais quoi" (Soulshaker club mix) – 7:39

Digital EP

1. "Je ne sais quoi" – 3:00
2. "Je ne sais quoi" (French version) – 3:01
3. "Je ne sais quoi" (ballad version) – 3:45

Digital remixes

1. "Je ne sais quoi" [radio edit] – 3:00
2. "Je ne sais quoi" [7th Heaven radio edit] – 3:27
3. "Je ne sais quoi" [club mix] – 3:49
4. "Je ne sais quoi" [Soulshaker club mix] – 7:39
5. "Je ne sais quoi" [Soulshaker radio edit] – 3:41
6. "Je ne sais quoi" [7th Heaven club mix] – 6:01
7. "Je ne sais quoi" [French vocal edit] – 2:59
8. "Je ne sais quoi" [Soulshaker dub mix] – 7:37

== Charts ==
Chart (2010)	Peak position
Belgium (Ultratop 50 Flanders)	27
Finland (Suomen virallinen lista)	17
Iceland (RÚV)	2
Sweden (Sverigetopplistan)	49
Swiss Singles Chart	64
UK Singles Chart	131
