= Ari Ólafsson =

Icelandic singer (born 1998)

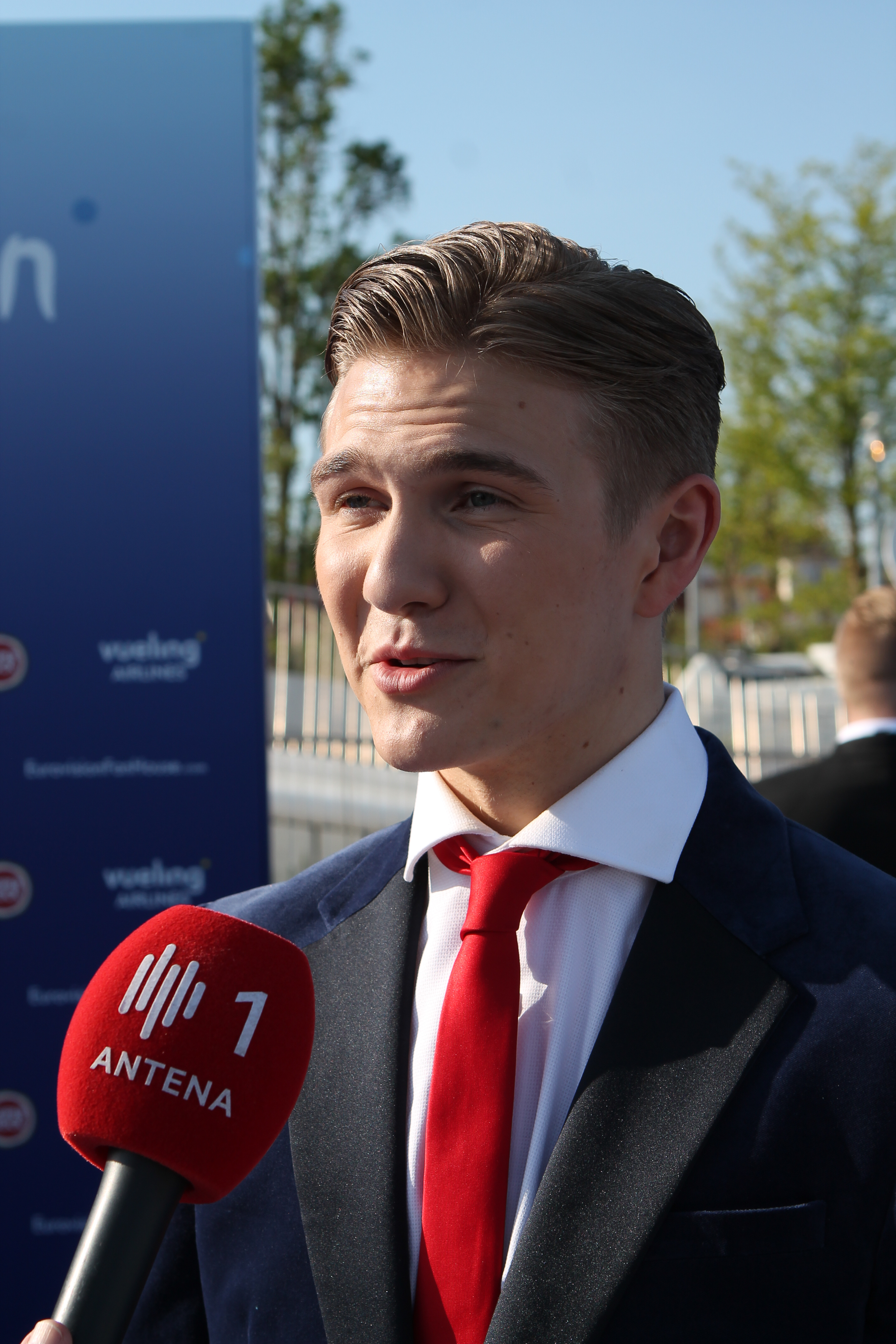
- Ari Ólafsson in May 2018

Background information
- Born: Ari Ólafsson; 21 May 1998 (age 28); Reykjavík, Iceland
- Genres: Pop
- Occupation: Singer
- Years active: 2015–present

Ari Ólafsson (Icelandic pronunciation: [ˈaːrɪ ˈouːlafsɔn]) (born 21 May 1998) is an Icelandic singer who represented Iceland in the Eurovision Song Contest 2018 with the song "Our Choice" which ended 19th in Semi Final 1 with 15 points.

Ari graduated from the Royal Academy of Music in London with a degree in opera and is currently pursuing a career in musical theatre.

== Discography ==
=== Singles ===
List of released singles
Title	Year	Album
"Heim"	2018	Non-album singles
"Our Choice"	2018	Non-album singles
"Ég man"	2022	Non-album singles

Preceded by Svala with "Paper"	Iceland in the Eurovision Song Contest; 2018	Succeeded by Hatari with "Hatrið mun sigra"
