= Ragnhildur Steinunn Jónsdóttir =

Icelandic actress and television presenter

- Born: 29 April 1981 (age 43); Keflavík, Iceland
- Occupation(s): Assistant director of RÚV, television presenter and actress

Ragnhildur Steinunn Jónsdóttir (born 29 April 1981) is an Icelandic actress and television presenter who is the assistant director of RÚV, the Icelandic national broadcaster. She is a former Miss Iceland.

== Life and career ==
Ragnhildur was born Keflavík where she lived most of her youth, excluding four years the family spent in Denmark. Her father is Jón Þór Harðarson, a mechanical engineer. Her mother, Ragnhildur Steinunn Maríusdóttir, died when she was seven years old. In the 1990s Ragnhildur was a gymnast; she won a bronze medal in the national championships in 1998 and was named to the national team. She completed an undergraduate degree in physiotherapy at the University of Iceland.

In 2003, she won Miss Iceland.

Ragnhildur began working for RÚV in 2004, with Ópið, a programme for teenagers, and was later a journalist and co-host on the primetime news/talk show Kastljós, and host of Dans dans dans, the Icelandic version of the American TV show So You Think You Can Dance. She has also hosted documentaries and worked as a scriptwriter, editor, and programme developer for RÚV, and in January 2018 she was named to a newly created post as assistant director of the company.

She hosted Söngvakeppni Sjónvarpsins 2007, the contest to decide Iceland's representation at the Eurovision Song Contest 2007, and many subsequent versions of the show, and is on the board of the Icelandic organisation with primary responsibility for organising the show, and is the spokesperson for Iceland at the Eurovision Song Contest.

In 2017, with Edda Hermannsdóttir, she published a book of interviews on gender equality, Forystuþjóð.

=== Filmography ===
- 2007 Astrópía
- 2009 Reykjavik Whale Watching Massacre
- 2009 The Big Rescue
- 2010 Mamma Gógó
- 2011 Polite People

== Personal life ==
In 2018 Ragnhildur married the footballer Haukur Ingi Guðnason, her partner since 1996; they have four children.

Preceded by Manuela Ósk Harðardóttir	Miss Iceland; 2003	Succeeded by Hugrún Harðardóttir
