= Iceland in the Eurovision Song Contest 2023 =

- Eurovision Song Contest 2023
- Participating broadcaster: Ríkisútvarpið (RÚV)
- Country: Iceland
- Selection process: Söngvakeppnin 2023
- Selection date: 4 March 2023

Competing entry
- Song: "Power"
- Artist: Diljá
- Songwriters: Pálmi Ragnar Ásgeirsson; Diljá Pétursdóttir

Placement
- Semi-final result: Failed to qualify (11th)

Participation chronology

Iceland was represented at the Eurovision Song Contest 2023 with the song "Power", written by Diljá Pétursdóttir and Pálmi Ragnar Ásgeirsson, and performed by Diljá herself. The Icelandic participating broadcaster, Ríkisútvarpið (RÚV), organised the national final Söngvakeppnin 2023 in order to select its entry for the contest. The national final consisted of two semi-finals on 18 and 25 February 2023, and a final on 4 March 2023.

Iceland was drawn to compete in the second semi-final of the Eurovision Song Contest which took place on 11 May 2023. Performing during the show in position 7, "Power" was not announced among the top 10 entries of the second semi-final and therefore did not qualify to compete in the final. It was later revealed that Iceland placed 11th out of the 16 participating countries in the semi-final with 44 points.

== Background ==
Prior to the 2023 contest, Iceland has participated in the Eurovision Song Contest 34 times since its first entry in 1986. The contest has been broadcast in Iceland since as early as 1970, but the geographically-remote nation was prevented from competing until a stable satellite connection could be established to enable live transmission of it. Iceland's best placing in the contest to this point was second, which it achieved on two occasions: in 1999 with the song "All Out of Luck" performed by Selma and in 2009 with the song "Is It True?" performed by Yohanna. Since the introduction of a semi-final to the format of the Eurovision Song Contest in 2004, Iceland has failed to qualify to the final seven times. In 2022, Iceland placed 23rd in the grand final with the song "Með hækkandi sól" performed by Systur.

The Icelandic national broadcaster, Ríkisútvarpið (RÚV), broadcasts the event within Iceland and organises the selection process for the nation's entry. The Icelandic broadcaster has used various methods to select the Icelandic entry in the past, such as internal selections and televised national finals to choose the performer and song to compete at Eurovision. Since 2006, RÚV has chosen its entry for Eurovision through Söngvakeppnin, a televised music competition. The only recent exception was for the 2021 contest, where Daði og Gagnamagnið returned as an internally selected entry following the 2020 contest's cancelation. RÚV confirmed its intention to participate at the 2023 contest on 29 August 2022, and concurrently affirmed details for the production of Söngvakeppnin 2023 to select its entry as well as opening the song submission process.

== Before Eurovision ==
=== Söngvakeppnin 2023 ===
Söngvakeppnin 2023 was the national final organised by RÚV in order to select Iceland's entry for the Eurovision Song Contest 2023. It consisted of two semi-finals on 18 and 25 February 2023 and a final on 4 March 2023. The shows took place in the RVK Studios in Gufunes, hosted by Ragnhildur Steinunn Jónsdóttir, Unnsteinn Manuel Stefánsson, and Sigurður Þorri Gunnarsson.

==== Format ====
In each semi-final, five of the ten competing acts performed, and the two entries which were determined solely by the viewing public through telephone voting and the newly introduced RÚV Stjörnur app progressed to the final. As per the rules of the competition, an additional optional qualifier could be selected by the contest organisers from among the non-qualifying acts, which would also progress to the final. This option was subsequently invoked by the organisers, meaning that a total of five acts qualified for the final.

In the final, two rounds of voting determined the winning song: in the first round, the votes of the viewing public through telephone voting and the votes of a ten-member international jury panel determined two entries which would progress to the second round. The public and jury each accounted for 50% of the result in the first round, with the rankings of each jury member being converted to match the total number of televotes cast by the public. In the second round, a further round of televoting will be held, with the winner determined by aggregating the results of the first round to the votes received in the second round.

==== Competing entries ====
Between 29 August and 4 October 2022, RÚV opened the period for interested songwriters to submit their entries. Songwriters did not have any particular requirement to meet, and the process was open to all. The broadcaster received 132 submissions at the closing of the deadline. The ten competing entries were revealed on 28 January 2023.

Söngvakeppnin 2023 – Competing entries
Artist	Song		Songwriter(s)
Artist	Icelandic title	English title	Songwriter(s)
Benedikt	"Þora"	"Brave Face"	Benedikt Gylfason, Hildur Kristín Stefánsdóttir, Una Torfadóttir
Bragi	"Stundum snýst heimurinn gegn þér"	"Sometimes the World's Against You"	Bragi Bergsson, Joy Deb, Rasmus Palmgren, Aniela Eklund
Celebs	"Dómsdags dans"	"Doomsday Dancing"	Hrafnkell Hugi Vernharðsson, Katla Vigdís Vernharðsdóttir, Valgeir Skorri Vernharðsson, Árni Hjörvar Árnason
Diljá	"Lifandi inni í mér"	"Power"	Pálmi Ragnar Ásgeirsson, Diljá Pétursdóttir
Kristín Sesselja	"Óbyggðir"	"Terrified"	Kristín Sesselja Einarsdóttir, Tiril Beisland, Vetle Sigmundstad, Guðrún Helga Jónasdóttir
Langi Seli og Skuggarnir	"OK"	—N/a	Axel Hallkell Jóhannesson, Erik Robert Qvick, Jón Þorleifur Steinþórsson
Móa	"Glötuð ást"	"Lose This Dream"	Móeiður Júníusdóttir, Guðrún Sigríður Guðlaugsdóttir
Sigga Ózk	"Gleyma þér og dansa"	"Dancing Lonely"	Klara Elias, Alma Goodman, David Mørup, James Gladius Wong
Silja Rós & Kjalar	"Ég styð þína braut"	"Together We Grow"	Silja Rós Ragnarsdóttir, Rasmus Olsen
Úlfar	"Betri maður"	"Impossible"	Rob Price, Úlfar Viktor Björnsson, Elín Sif Halldórsdóttir

==== Semi-finals ====
Two semi-finals took place on 18 and 25 February 2023. In each semi-final, five of the ten competing acts performed, and two entries progressed to the final, determined solely by the viewing public through telephone voting and the RÚV Stjörnur app. In addition to the performances of the competing entries, a number of guest performances were also featured during the two shows. The first semi-final featured a performance from Friðrik Dór Jónsson. The second semi-final featured performances from Ragnhildur Gísladóttir, Unnsteinn Manuel Stefánsson, Guðlaug Sóley Höskuldsdóttir, and Sveinbjörns Thorarensen. In addition, an optional qualifier was selected by the contest organisers from among the non-qualifying acts, which also progressed to the final.

Semi-final 1 – 18 February 2023
R/O	Artist	Song	Votes	Place	Result
1	Benedikt	"Þora"	2,262	5	Eliminated
2	Diljá	"Lifandi inni í mér"	9,605	1	Finalist
3	Celebs	"Dómsdags dans"	7,133	3	Wildcard
4	Bragi	"Stundum snýst heimurinn gegn þér"	7,135	2	Finalist
5	Móa	"Glötuð ást"	3,308	4	Eliminated

Semi-final 2 – 25 February 2023
R/O	Artist	Song	Votes	Place	Result
1	Úlfar	"Betri maður"	6,862	3	Eliminated
2	Kristín Sesselja	"Óbyggðir"	2,638	5	Eliminated
3	Langi Seli og Skuggarnir	"OK"	12,714	1	Finalist
4	Silja Rós & Kjalar	"Ég styð þína braut"	5,178	4	Eliminated
5	Sigga Ózk	"Gleyma þér og dansa"	10,024	2	Finalist

==== Final ====
The final took place on 4 March 2023 and featured the four qualifiers and the wildcard from the semi-finals. In the semi-finals, all competing entries were required to be performed in Icelandic; however, entries competing in the final were required to be presented in the language they would compete with in the Eurovision Song Contest. Langi Seli og Skuggarnir decided to perform their entry in Icelandic while the other four entries decided to perform their entry in English. In addition to the competing entries, the 2022 Icelandic representatives Systur and 2022 Norwegian representatives Subwoolfer performed as interval acts. Gaute Ormåsen, a member of Subwoolfer, was also part of the jury panel.

Final – First round – 4 March 2023
R/O	Artist	Song	Jury	Televote	Total	Place	Result
1	Sigga Ózk	"Dancing Lonely"	24,350	12,179	36,529	5	Eliminated
2	Bragi	"Sometimes the World's Against You"	22,345	14,463	36,808	4	Eliminated
3	Celebs	"Doomsday Dancing"	23,491	17,436	40,927	3	Eliminated
4	Diljá	"Power"	30,939	47,549	78,488	1	Advanced
5	Langi Seli og Skuggarnir	"OK"	22,059	31,557	53,616	2	Advanced

Detailed Jury Votes
R/O	Song	Juror										Total
R/O	Song	1	2	3	4	5	6	7	8	9	10	Total
1	"Dancing Lonely"	2,292	2,292	2,005	2,292	1,719	3,438	3,438	2,005	2,864	2,005	24,350
2	"Sometimes the World's Against You"	2,864	2,005	2,864	2,864	2,005	2,292	1,719	1,719	2,292	1,719	22,345
3	"Doomsday Dancing"	2,005	3,438	2,292	1,719	2,292	1,719	2,005	2,864	1,719	3,438	23,491
4	"Power"	3,438	2,864	3,438	3,438	2,864	2,864	2,292	3,438	3,438	2,864	30,939
5	"OK"	1,719	1,719	1,719	2,005	3,438	2,005	2,864	2,292	2,005	2,292	22,059

Jury members (sorted by country)
- Australia: Emely Griggs
- Denmark: Ihan Haydar
- Iceland: Guðlaug Sóley Höskuldsdóttir
- Iceland: Joey Christ
- Iceland: Jón Ólafsson
- Iceland: Lay Low
- Lithuania: Ramūnas Zilnys
- Norway: Gaute Ormåsen
- Sweden: Helena Nilsson
- Turkey: Ersin Parlak

Final – Second round – 4 March 2023
R/O	Artist	Song	Votes			Place
R/O	Artist	Song	Round 1	Round 2	Total	Place
1	Diljá	"Power"	78,488	85,515	164,003	1
2	Langi Seli og Skuggarnir	"OK"	53,616	42,235	95,851	2

=== Promotion ===
To promote the entry, Diljá performed her song live on numerous Eurovision pre-parties, namely, Barcelona Eurovision Party, Polish Eurovision Party, and London Eurovision Party. She also performed in the Eurovision in Concert held in Amsterdam.

== At Eurovision ==
According to Eurovision rules, all nations with the exceptions of the host country and the "Big Five" (France, Germany, Italy, Spain and the United Kingdom) are required to qualify from one of two semi-finals in order to compete for the final; the top ten countries from each semi-final progress to the final. The European Broadcasting Union (EBU) split up the competing countries into six different pots based on voting patterns from previous contests, with countries with favourable voting histories put into the same pot. On 31 January 2023, an allocation draw was held, which placed each country into one of the two semi-finals, and determined which half of the show they would perform in. Iceland has been placed into the second semi-final, to be held on 11 May 2023, and has been scheduled to perform in the first half of the show.

Once all the competing songs for the 2023 contest had been released, the running order for the semi-finals was decided by the shows' producers rather than through another draw, so that similar songs were not placed next to each other. Iceland was set to perform in position 7, following the entry from Cyprus and before the entry from Greece.

At the end of the show, Iceland was not among the ten countries announced as qualifiers for the final.

The two semi-finals and the final were televised in Iceland on RÚV with commentary by Gísli Marteinn Baldursson, and on RÚV 2 with Icelandic Sign Language interpretation. Audience share in Iceland was the highest across all participating countries, with 98.7% of all Icelandic television viewers reported to have watched some of the Eurovision 2023 grand final.

=== Voting ===
==== Points awarded to Iceland ====
Points awarded to Iceland (Semi-final)
Score	Televote
12 points	Denmark
10 points	
8 points	
7 points	San Marino (Note: San Marino uses a jury in the semi-finals.)
6 points	Georgia
5 points	Australia
4 points	
3 points	Rest of the World; Slovenia
2 points	Estonia; Lithuania
1 point	Albania; Austria; Belgium; United Kingdom

==== Points awarded by Iceland ====
Points awarded by Iceland (Semi-final)
Score	Televote
12 points	Australia
10 points	Poland
8 points	Austria
7 points	Belgium
6 points	Denmark
5 points	Cyprus
4 points	Lithuania
3 points	Estonia
2 points	Albania
1 point	Slovenia

Points awarded by Iceland (Final)
Score	Televote	Jury
12 points	Finland	Australia
10 points	Sweden	Finland
8 points	Norway	Austria
7 points	Poland	Sweden
6 points	Belgium	Czech Republic
5 points	Croatia	Belgium
4 points	France	Norway
3 points	Australia	Spain
2 points	Ukraine	Germany
1 point	Italy	Serbia

==== Detailed voting results ====
The following members comprised the Icelandic jury:

- Arnar Eggert Thoroddsen - Musician, lecturer, programme director
- Sigurjón Örn Böðvarsson - Singer
- Heiða Eiríksdóttir - Singer-songwriter
- Kristjana Stefánsdóttir - Singer, musical director, arranger, composer
- Lovísa Rut Kristjánsdóttir - Program producer

Detailed voting results from Iceland (Semi-final 2)
R/O	Country	Televote	
R/O	Country	Rank	Points
01	Denmark	5	6
02	Armenia	12	
03	Romania	14	
04	Estonia	8	3
05	Belgium	4	7
06	Cyprus	6	5
07	Iceland		
08	Greece	13	
09	Poland	2	10
10	Slovenia	10	1
11	Georgia	11	
12	San Marino	15	
13	Austria	3	8
14	Albania	9	2
15	Lithuania	7	4
16	Australia	1	12

Detailed voting results from Iceland (Final)
R/O	Country	Jury							Televote	
R/O	Country	Juror A	Juror B	Juror C	Juror D	Juror E	Rank	Points	Rank	Points
01	Austria	9	1	5	9	3	3	8	12	
02	Portugal	14	12	20	23	19	21		25	
03	Switzerland	13	20	16	19	15	20		17	
04	Poland	26	16	23	24	24	25		4	7
05	Serbia	25	2	19	10	16	10	1	21	
06	France	21	13	18	13	25	22		7	4
07	Cyprus	5	24	17	20	10	13		15	
08	Spain	12	14	14	6	5	8	3	24	
09	Sweden	1	11	4	4	17	4	7	2	10
10	Albania	10	5	8	26	13	11		23	
11	Italy	7	23	7	14	22	12		10	1
12	Estonia	11	21	12	18	18	19		19	
13	Finland	2	9	1	3	6	2	10	1	12
14	Czech Republic	15	4	3	2	11	5	6	14	
15	Australia	3	3	2	1	1	1	12	8	3
16	Belgium	6	6	6	5	4	6	5	5	6
17	Armenia	8	18	13	12	20	17		26	
18	Moldova	16	10	24	17	8	16		13	
19	Ukraine	19	19	9	8	23	15		9	2
20	Norway	4	17	11	7	9	7	4	3	8
21	Germany	17	15	10	22	2	9	2	18	
22	Lithuania	20	8	22	15	12	18		16	
23	Israel	18	26	15	21	26	24		11	
24	Slovenia	23	25	26	11	14	23		22	
25	Croatia	24	7	21	16	7	14		6	5
26	United Kingdom	22	22	25	25	21	26		20	
