= Iceland in the Eurovision Song Contest 2024 =

- Eurovision Song Contest 2024
- Participating broadcaster: Ríkisútvarpið (RÚV)
- Country: Iceland
- Selection process: Söngvakeppnin 2024
- Selection date: 2 March 2024

Competing entry
- Song: "Scared of Heights"
- Artist: Hera Björk
- Songwriters: Ásdís María Viðarsdóttir; Ferras Alqaisi; Jaro Omar; Michael Burek

Placement
- Semi-final result: Failed to qualify (15th)

Participation chronology

Iceland was represented at the Eurovision Song Contest 2024 with the song "Scared of Heights", written by Ásdís María Viðarsdóttir, Ferras Alqaisi, Jaro Omar, and Michael Burek, and performed by Hera Björk. The Icelandic participating broadcaster, Ríkisútvarpið (RÚV), organised the national final Söngvakeppnin 2024 in order to select its entry for the contest.

Iceland was drawn to compete in the first semi-final of the Eurovision Song Contest which took place on 7 May 2024. Performing during the show in position 8, "Scared of Heights" was not announced among the top 10 entries of the first semi-final and therefore did not qualify to compete in the final. It was later revealed that Iceland placed 15th (last) out of the 15 participating countries in the semi-final with 3 points.

== Background ==
Prior to the 2024 contest, Ríkisútvarpið (RÚV) had participated in the Eurovision Song Contest representing Iceland thirty-nine times since its first entry in 1986. Its best placing in the contest to this point was second, which it achieved on two occasions: in 1999 with the song "All Out of Luck" performed by Selma and in 2009 with the song "Is It True?" performed by Yohanna. It also reached two more top-5 positions: in 1990 with the song "Eitt lag enn" performed by Stjórnin and in 2021 with the song "10 Years" performed by Daði og Gagnamagnið, ending fourth on both occasions. Since the introduction of semi-finals in 2004, it had failed to qualify to the final eight times, including in 2023, when the song "Power" performed by Diljá placed 11th in the second semi-final.

As part of its duties as participating broadcaster, RÚV organises the selection of its entry in the Eurovision Song Contest and broadcasts the event in the country. From 2006 to 2020 and again since 2022, it selected its entry through Söngvakeppnin, a televised national competition. RÚV confirmed its intention to participate in the 2024 contest on 30 May 2023, while also confirming Söngvakeppnin as its national selection method.

== Before Eurovision ==
=== Söngvakeppnin 2024 ===
Söngvakeppnin 2024 was the national final organised by RÚV in order to select its entry for the Eurovision Song Contest 2024. It consisted of two semi-finals on 17 and 24 February 2024 at Truenorth Studio, and a final on 2 March 2024 at Laugardalshöll – both located in Reykjavík. The shows were presented by Ragnhildur Steinunn Jónsdóttir, Sigurður Þorri Gunnarsson, and Unnsteinn Manuel Stefánsson. The semi-final qualifiers were determined by televoting, while a combination of jury and public votes was used to determine the results of the final and superfinal.

==== Competing entries ====
On 15 June 2023, RÚV opened the period for interested songwriters to submit their entries, lasting until 10 September; at the closing of the submission window, 118 entries had been received. In addition to reviewing the submissions, the broadcaster also directly invited established artists to compete. The ten selected entries were unveiled on 27 January 2024, with one participant, Bashar Murad, revealed three days prior. Among the entrants was Hera Björk, who previously represented Iceland in the Eurovision Song Contest 2010.

Artist	Song (Note: Artists were required to perform the entries in Icelandic in the national semi-finals, but had the option to switch to an English-language version for the final ahead of the contest.)		Songwriter(s)
Artist	Icelandic title	English title	Songwriter(s)
Anita	"Stingum af"	"Downfall"	Ásdís María Viðarsdóttir; Jake Tench
Bashar Murad	"Vestrið villt"	"Wild West"	Bashar Murad; Einar Hrafn Stefánsson; Matthías Tryggvi Haraldsson
Blankiflúr	"Sjá þig"	"Love You"	Albert Sigurðsson; Hólmfríður Sigurðardóttir; Kristín Sigurðardóttir; Páll Axel Sigurðsson; Sólveig Sigurðardóttir
CeaseTone	"Ró"	"Flow"	Hafsteinn Þráinsson; Halldór Eldjárn; Una Torfadóttir
Heiðrún Anna	"Þjakaður af ást"	—N/a	Heiðrún Anna Björnsdóttir; Rut Ríkey Tryggvadóttir
Hera Björk	"Við förum hærra"	"Scared of Heights"	Ásdís María Viðarsdóttir; Ferras Alqaisi; Jaro Omar; Michael Burek
Maiaa	"Fljúga burt"	"Break Away"	Baldvin Snær Hlynsson; Helga Soffía Ólafsdóttir; María Agnesardóttir
Sigga Ózk	"Um allan alheiminn"	"Into the Atmosphere"	Birkir Blær Óðinsson; Mikołaj Maciej Trybulec; Sigríður Ósk Hrafnkelsdóttir
Sunny	"Fiðrildi"	—N/a	Nikulás Nikulásson; Sunna Kristinsdóttir
Væb	"Bíómynd"	"Movie Scene"	Drífa Nadía Thoroddsen Mechiat; Hálfdán Helgi Matthíasson; Matthías Davíð Matthíasson

==== Semi-finals ====
Two semi-finals took place on 17 and 24 February 2024. Five entries performed in each, with two qualifying for the final; RÚV reserved the option to select a fifth finalist among the non-qualifiers, which was later invoked. In addition to the performances of the competing entries, a number of guest performances were also featured during the two shows. The first semi-final featured a duet by Friðrik Ómar Hjörleifsson (Icelandic representative in 2008 as part of Eurobandið) and Sigríður Beinteinsdóttir (Icelandic representative in 1990 as part of Stjórnin, 1992 as part of Heart 2 Heart, and 1994), who performed a medley of Icelandic Eurovision entries. The second semi-final featured a performance from Daniil and Joey Christ, who opened the show with their song "Ef þeir vilja beef", and an interval act from Björgvin Halldórsson (Icelandic representative in 1995) and Unnsteinn Manuel Stefánsson.

Key:

Televote qualifier
Wildcard qualifier

Semi-final 1 – 17 February 2024
R/O	Artist	Song	Votes	Place
1	Blankiflúr	"Sjá þig"	3,046	3
2	CeaseTone	"Ró"	1,344	4
3	Væb	"Bíómynd"	7,347	1
4	Sunny	"Fiðrildi"	577	5
5	Anita	"Stingum af"	6,514	2

Semi-final 2 – 24 February 2024
R/O	Artist	Song	Votes	Place
1	Sigga Ózk	"Um allan alheiminn"	6,730	3
2	Heiðrún Anna	"Þjakaður af ást"	1,053	5
3	Bashar Murad	"Vestrið villt"	9,034	1
4	Maiaa	"Fljúga burt"	3,184	4
5	Hera Björk	"Við förum hærra"	8,552	2

==== Final ====
The final took place on 2 March 2024 and featured the four qualifiers and the wildcard from the semi-finals. While in the semi-finals all competing entries were required to be performed in Icelandic, in the final they had to be presented in the language they would be performed in at the Eurovision Song Contest: Væb opted for the Icelandic version, while the other four entrants opted for the English one. In addition to the competing entries, Diljá Pétursdóttir (Icelandic representative in 2023) and Selma Björnsdóttir (Icelandic representative in 1999 and 2005) performed as interval acts.

A 50/50 combination of jury and public votes determined two superfinalists, who then went through an additional televoting round; the sum of the two votings decreed the winner. For the first time since 2016, the jury in the final consisted exclusively of Icelanders, namely: Vigdís Hafliðadóttir (singer, actress and human right activist), Sindri Ástmarsson (programme director of Iceland Airwaves), Erna Hrönn (singer and radio host), Árni Matthíasson (music journalist and writer), Sigríður Beinteinsdóttir (singer), Einar Bárðarson (chairman of the board of the Icelandic Music Information Centre) and Elín Hall (musician).

Final – First round – 2 March 2024
R/O	Artist	Song	Jury	Televote	Total	Place
1	Væb	"Bíómynd"	13,656	15,727	29,383	4
2	Hera Björk	"Scared of Heights"	16,661	15,406	32,067	2
3	Anita	"Downfall"	14,476	10,124	24,600	5
4	Bashar Murad	"Wild West"	21,304	26,359	47,663	1
5	Sigga Ózk	"Into the Atmosphere"	16,114	14,595	30,709	3

Detailed jury votes (Note: Mathematical equivalents of the jury rankings for the purpose of summing them to the audience votes in a 50/50 ratio)
R/O	Song	Juror							Total
R/O	Song	1	2	3	4	5	6	7	Total
1	"Bíómynd"	1,639	1,912	1,639	1,912	2,185	2,731	1,639	13,656
2	"Scared of Heights"	1,912	2,185	2,185	1,639	3,278	2,185	3,278	16,661
3	"Downfall"	2,185	1,639	2,731	2,731	1,639	1,639	1,912	14,476
4	"Wild West"	3,278	2,731	3,278	3,278	2,731	3,278	2,731	21,304
5	"Into the Atmosphere"	2,731	3,278	1,912	2,185	1,912	1,912	2,185	16,114

Superfinal – 2 March 2024
R/O	Artist	Song	Votes			Place
R/O	Artist	Song	Round 1	Round 2	Total	Place
1	Hera Björk	"Scared of Heights"	32,067	68,768	100,835	1
2	Bashar Murad	"Wild West"	47,663	49,832	97,495	2

==== Ratings ====
Viewing figures by show
Show	Air date	Average viewership	Total viewership	Rating (%)	Ref.
Semi-final 1	17 February 2024	92,420	121,080	35.01%	
Semi-final 2	24 February 2024	87,120	110,900	33%	
Final	2 March 2024	105,330	144,810	39.9%	

==== Official album ====
Cover art of the official compilation album

Söngvakeppnin 2024 is the official compilation album of the contest. It was compiled by RÚV and was digitally released by Alda Music under the former's exclusive license on 28 January 2024. The album features both the Icelandic and English versions of the entries.

Weekly chart performance for Söngvakeppnin 2024
Chart (2024)	Peak position
Icelandic Albums (Tónlistinn)	5

=== Promotion ===
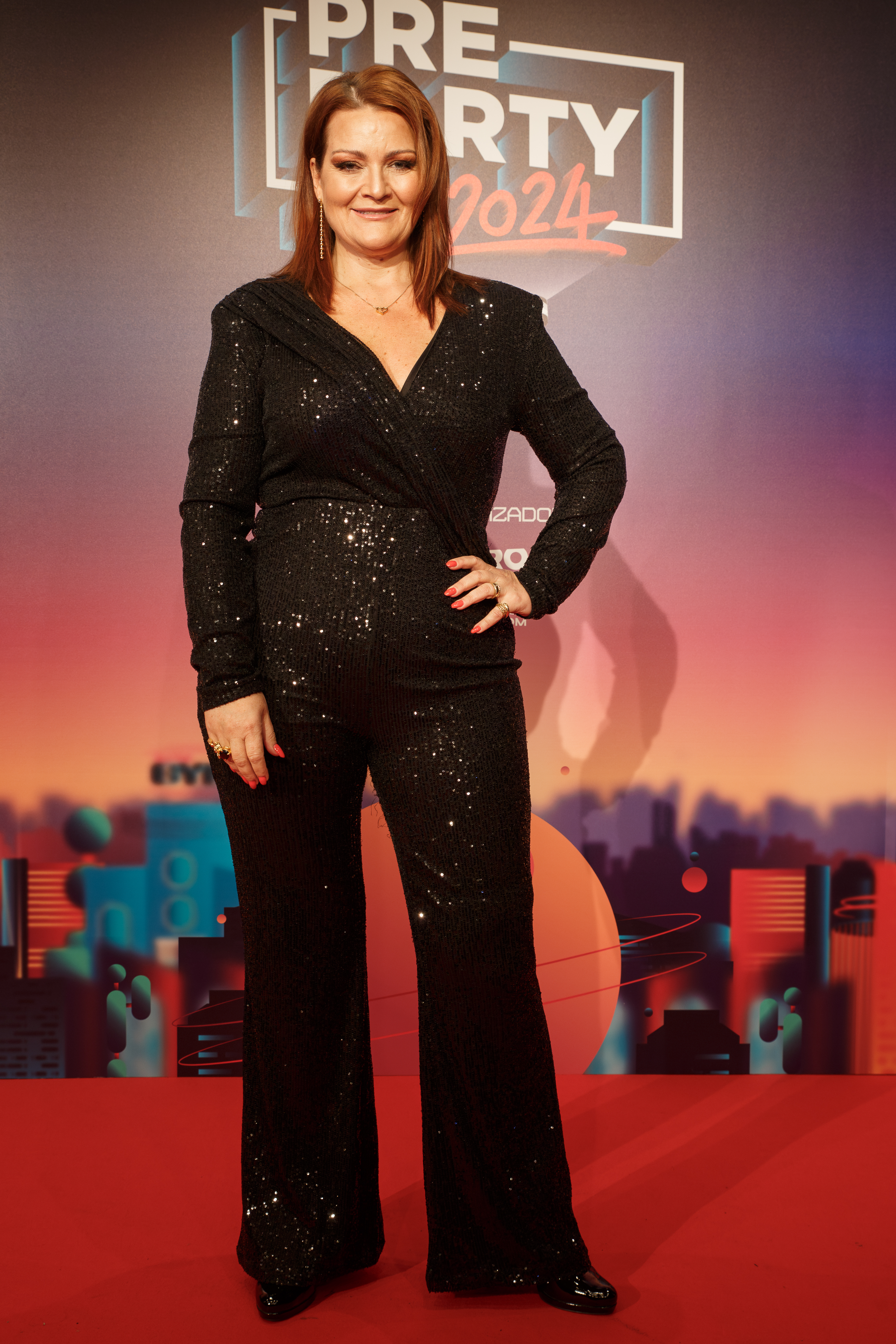
Hera Björk at the PrePartyES event in Madrid.

As part of the promotion of her participation in the contest, Hera Björk attended the PrePartyES in Madrid on 30 March 2024, the Eurovision in Concert event in Amsterdam on 13 April 2024, the Nordic Eurovision Party in Stockholm on 14 April 2024, the Nordic Music Celebration's Eurovision Night in Oslo on 20 April 2024 and the Copenhagen Eurovision Party (Malmöhagen) on 4 May 2024.

=== Controversies ===
==== Calls for boycott ====
The inclusion of Israel in the list of participants of the 2024 contest, despite the humanitarian crisis resulting from Israeli military operations in the Gaza Strip during the Gaza war, sparked controversy in Iceland as well as several other participating countries, with calls and petitions for broadcasters to boycott the event. Despite an initial statement that Iceland would still participate in the contest, petitions received from the Association of Composers and Lyricists of Iceland (FTT) and activists of the Boycott, Divestment and Sanctions (BDS) movement prompted RÚV to decide that its participation would be evaluated after discussing with the winning artist of Söngvakeppnin, thus making the national final independent from the contest for the first time. Ahead of the final, both eventual superfinalists Hera Björk and Bashar Murad confirmed that they would take part in Eurovision if they won, while none of the other finalists had made a decision. However, RÚV decided to delay its final decision to 11 March, the deadline by which all participating countries must have submitted their entries; the broadcaster confirmed that Hera Björk would participate in Eurovision on that day. Gísli Marteinn Baldursson, who had served as RÚV's commentator for the contest from 1999 to 2005 and again since 2016, opted not to resume the role for 2024 in response to the European Broadcasting Union (EBU)'s "lack of reaction" to Israel's offensive in Gaza. Murad, who is Palestinian, later performed at the "Falastinvision" event, which was organised in Malmö as an alternative to the Eurovision final in protest against Israel's participation.

In a March 2024 poll by Maskína, 32.3% of Icelanders wanted Iceland to take part in Eurovision, 42.2% were opposed to Iceland's participation, and 25.5% did not have an opinion. A similar poll by Prósent showed 31% in support, 46% opposed, and 23% no opinion.

==== App voting failure and allegations of voting irregularities ====
RÚV Stjörnur, the app used for voting during the national final, was alleged to have experienced a glitch during the superfinal voting. Many viewers reported on social media platforms regarding the supposed glitch. Lilja Kristín Birgisdóttir, director of marketing and communications at Vodafone Iceland, said in an interview that the company's representatives looked into the matter together with the Söngvakeppnin producers and later reported that all the systems worked as expected, suggesting that the issue was not systemic on Vodafone's part.

Einar Hrafn Stefánsson, one of the songwriters of "Wild West", called for an investigation carried out by an independent party as regards the conduct of the voting in the contest. Rúnar Freyr Gíslason, Söngvakeppnin's executive director, later stated that an investigation into the glitch was launched, while also clarifying that the total number of SMS votes received by the superfinalists did not influence the final results. It was further explained by the contest producers that this was because only a few users were affected by the issue. After the release of the results, Einar said that his request for an independent investigation had been denied, pushing him to request a re-voting. However, Stefán Eiríksson, RÚV's radio director, reiterated that the results were beyond doubt, despite the fact that the broadcaster had no information as to why the problem only occurred on Murad's number.

Later, an open letter signed by more than 1,200 Icelanders was sent to Rúnar Freyr and the RÚV board demanding for an in-depth investigation of the voting irregularities during the contest. Ásdís María Viðarsdóttir, one of the songwriters of "Scared of Heights", stated that she would "cut ties with the song" over RÚV's refusal to shed further light, stating that "[her] conscience [didn't] allow it" and citing racism in the Icelandic public's reaction to Murad's participation as an additional reason for her choice. Einar's request for an investigation was subsequently granted, with Stefán disclosing that RÚV had decided to appoint an independent expert to carry out an assessment of the voting procedure.

On 10 March 2024, it was reported by the news site Mannlíf that Yogev Segal, an employee of Israeli broadcaster Kan, had allegedly started a campaign to vote against Murad during the Söngvakeppnin final. Segal was purported to be one of the moderators of a Facebook group called "Israeli-Icelandic Conversation", allegedly active since January 2024, and to have encouraged its members to vote for Hera Björk in the competition in order to prevent Murad from winning. In a message to Greek fansite Eurovisionfun, Segal admitted his involvement with the group, while clarifying that Kan had no relation to it and that it only had a small number of Icelandic members, dismissing any allegations of interference in the voting. He claimed that the post which had sparked the accusations was his "peaceful" attempt to call out the "meddling of politics" in Eurovision rather than a campaign against Murad.

== At Eurovision ==
The Eurovision Song Contest 2024 is taking place at the Malmö Arena in Malmö, Sweden, and consists of two semi-finals held on the respective dates of 7 and 9 May and the final on 11 May 2024. All nations with the exceptions of the host country and the "Big Five" (France, Germany, Italy, Spain and the United Kingdom) are required to qualify from one of two semi-finals in order to compete in the final; the top ten countries from each semi-final progress to the final. On 30 January 2024, an allocation draw was held to determine which of the two semi-finals, as well as which half of the show, each country would perform in; the EBU split up the competing countries into different pots based on voting patterns from previous contests, with countries with favourable voting histories put into the same pot. Iceland was scheduled for the second half of the first semi-final. The shows' producers then decided the running order for the semi-finals; Iceland was set to perform in position 8.

Ahead of the contest, RÚV organised and broadcast the traditional Eurovision preview show Alla leið between 13 April and 4 May 2024; hosted by Eva Ruza, it featured a panel of guests who discussed and evaluated the competing entries across several weeks, ultimately decreeing a favourite – namely France's Slimane with "Mon amour". In addition, as part of the Eurovision programming, RÚV cooperated with DR and SVT alongside other EBU member broadcasters – namely ARD/WDR, the BBC, ČT, ERR, France Télévisions, NRK, NTR, VRT and Yle – to produce and air a documentary titled ABBA – Against the Odds, on the occasion of the 50th anniversary of Sweden's first victory at the contest with "Waterloo" by ABBA.

In Iceland, all the shows are being broadcast on RÚV, with Icelandic commentary provided by Gunna Dís Emilsdóttir, and on RÚV 2, with Icelandic Sign Language interpreters; the first semi-final and the final are also airing on radio via Rás 2.

=== Performance ===
Hera Björk took part in technical rehearsals on 28 April and 1 May, followed by dress rehearsals on 6 and 7 May. For her performance of "Scared of Heights" at the contest, she was joined by five backing singers, with the colour gold dominating her clothing and the graphics.

=== Semi-final ===
Iceland performed in position 8, following the entry from Croatia and before the entry from Slovenia. The country was not announced among the top 10 entries in the semi-final and therefore failed to qualify to compete in the final. It was later revealed that Iceland placed fifteenth (last) out of the fifteen participating countries in the first semi-final with 3 points.

=== Voting ===
Below is a breakdown of points awarded by and to Iceland in the first semi-final and in the final. Voting during the three shows involved each country awarding sets of points from 1–8, 10 and 12: one from their professional jury and the other from televoting in the final vote, while the semi-final vote was based entirely on the vote of the public. The Icelandic jury consisted of Diljá Pétursdóttir, who represented Iceland in the 2023 contest, Ívar Guðmundsson, Marino Geir Lilliendahl, Þórður Helgi Þórðarson, and Þórunn Erna Clausen. In the first semi-final, Iceland placed 15th and last with 3 points. Over the course of the contest, Iceland awarded its 12 points to Croatia in the first semi-final, and to France (jury) and Croatia (televote) in the final.

RÚV appointed Friðrik Ómar Hjörleifsson, who represented Iceland in the 2008 contest as part of Eurobandið, as its spokesperson to announce the Icelandic jury's votes in the final.

==== Points awarded to Iceland ====
Points awarded to Iceland (Semi-final 1)
Score	Televote
12 points	
10 points	
8 points	
7 points	
6 points	
5 points	
4 points	
3 points	
2 points	Sweden
1 point	Cyprus

==== Points awarded by Iceland ====
Points awarded by Iceland (Semi-final 1)
Score	Televote
12 points	Croatia
10 points	Ukraine
8 points	Poland
7 points	Lithuania
6 points	Finland
5 points	Luxembourg
4 points	Cyprus
3 points	Ireland
2 points	Australia
1 point	Portugal

Points awarded by Iceland (Final)
Score	Televote	Jury
12 points	Croatia	France
10 points	France	Croatia
8 points	Israel	United Kingdom
7 points	Sweden	Ireland
6 points	Switzerland	Switzerland
5 points	Ukraine	Armenia
4 points	Lithuania	Portugal
3 points	Ireland	Ukraine
2 points	Germany	Germany
1 point	Finland	Sweden

==== Detailed voting results ====
Each participating broadcaster assembles a five-member jury panel consisting of music industry professionals who are citizens of the country they represent. Each jury, and individual jury member, is required to meet a strict set of criteria regarding professional background, as well as diversity in gender and age. No member of a national jury was permitted to be related in any way to any of the competing acts in such a way that they cannot vote impartially and independently. The individual rankings of each jury member as well as the nation's televoting results were released shortly after the grand final.

The following members comprised the Icelandic jury:

- Diljá Pétursdóttir
- Ívar Guðmundsson
- Marino Geir Lilliendahl
- Þórður Helgi Þórðarson
- Þórunn Erna Clausen

Detailed voting results from Iceland (Semi-final 1)
R/O	Country	Televote	
R/O	Country	Rank	Points
01	Cyprus	7	4
02	Serbia	12	
03	Lithuania	4	7
04	Ireland	8	3
05	Ukraine	2	10
06	Poland	3	8
07	Croatia	1	12
08	Iceland		
09	Slovenia	13	
10	Finland	5	6
11	Moldova	11	
12	Azerbaijan	14	
13	Australia	9	2
14	Portugal	10	1
15	Luxembourg	6	5

Detailed voting results from Iceland (Final)
R/O	Country	Jury							Televote	
R/O	Country	Juror A	Juror B	Juror C	Juror D	Juror E	Rank	Points	Rank	Points
01	Sweden	13	5	12	9	7	10	1	4	7
02	Ukraine	20	4	6	7	8	8	3	6	5
03	Germany	22	6	7	12	4	9	2	9	2
04	Luxembourg	10	18	8	8	11	13		20	
~~05~~	~~Netherlands~~ ‡ (Note: The Netherlands was disqualified prior to the final.)	~~25~~	~~7~~	~~13~~	~~19~~	~~17~~	~~16~~		N/A	
06	Israel	23	26	24	23	16	25		3	8
07	Lithuania	17	12	14	17	20	18		7	4
08	Spain	16	17	15	18	19	20		19	
09	Estonia	26	24	26	24	26	26		17	
10	Ireland	8	10	5	4	3	4	7	8	3
11	Latvia	14	16	25	26	25	22		12	
12	Greece	18	25	23	10	15	19		21	
13	United Kingdom	12	3	9	3	5	3	8	18	
14	Norway	5	19	17	13	18	14		11	
15	Italy	2	13	18	16	12	11		16	
16	Serbia	21	23	19	15	22	23		23	
17	Finland	24	9	4	11	10	12		10	1
18	Portugal	4	15	11	5	6	7	4	24	
19	Armenia	1	20	2	21	13	6	5	14	
20	Cyprus	11	8	20	20	14	15		15	
21	Switzerland	9	14	10	2	2	5	6	5	6
22	Slovenia	15	21	21	22	23	24		25	
23	Croatia	6	1	1	6	9	2	10	1	12
24	Georgia	19	22	16	14	21	21		22	
25	France	3	2	3	1	1	1	12	2	10
26	Austria	7	11	22	25	24	17		13	
