= Diljá =

Icelandic singer (born 2001)

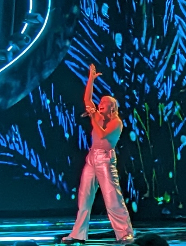
- Diljá in 2023

Background information
- Born: Diljá Pétursdóttir; 15 December 2001 (age 24); Kópavogur, Iceland
- Genre: Pop
- Occupation: Singer
- Instrument: Vocals
- Years active: 2015–present
- Website: diljamusic.com

Diljá Pétursdóttir (Icelandic: [ˈtɪljauː ˈpʰjɛːtʏr̥sˌtouhtɪr]; born 15 December 2001), simply known as Diljá, is an Icelandic singer. She represented Iceland in the Eurovision Song Contest 2023 with the song "Power", which topped the charts in Iceland and finished in 11th place in the second semi-final.

== Biography ==
Diljá made her name by participating in the talent show Ísland Got Talent in 2015. In 2020, she moved to Copenhagen, where she alternated her studies in physiotherapy with singing lessons.

In January 2023, Diljá was confirmed among the 10 participants in the annual Söngvakeppnin, a festival used to select the Icelandic representative in the Eurovision Song Contest. On 18 February, she presented her unreleased single "Lifandi inni í mér" during the first semi-final, and qualified for the final. At the final on 4 March, she presented the English-language Eurovision version of her song, "Power". She went on to win the competition, beating Langi Seli og Skuggarnir in the superfinal, making her the Icelandic representative at the Eurovision Song Contest 2023 in Liverpool. "Lifandi inni í mér" reached the 6th position of the Icelandic chart, while "Power" was placed 1st.

“Power" was 7th in the running order for the second semi-final and ended up placing 11th with 44 points. She subsequently did not qualify for the grand final.

== Discography ==
=== Singles ===
==== As lead artist ====
List of singles, with selected chart positions
Title	Year	Peak chart positions		Album or EP
Title	Year	ICE	LTU	Album or EP
"Lifandi inni í mér"	2023	6	—	Söngvakeppnin 2023
"Power"	2023	1	78	Söngvakeppnin 2023
"Crazy"	2023	29	—	Non-album singles
"Say My Name"	2023	—	—	Non-album singles
"Einhver"	2024	—	—	Non-album singles
"I'll Wait" (with Fosteii)	2024	—	—	Non-album singles
"Það kemur aftur vetur" (with Valdis)	2025	—	—	Non-album singles
"I Know What It Means"	2026	*	—	Non-album singles
"Svona var lífið" (with Hreimur)	2026	*	—	Non-album singles
"Ó Rómeó"	2026	*	—	Non-album singles
"Eltu drauminn" (with Birgir)	2026	*	—	Non-album singles
"Við og við" (with Friðrik Dór)	2026	*	—	Non-album singles
"Það eru jól og hjartað verður hlýtt" (with Löður)	2026	*	—	Non-album singles
"—" denotes a recording that did not chart or was not released in that territory. "*" denotes that the chart did not exist at that time.

==== As featured artist ====
Title	Year	Album or EP
"Ég sé rautt" (Celebs featuring Diljá)	2023	Non-album single
"Scream" (Aron Hannes and Creature of Habit featuring Diljá)	2025	Vol.1

== See also ==
- Iceland in the Eurovision Song Contest 2023

Awards and achievements
Preceded by Systur with "Með hækkandi sól"	Iceland in the Eurovision Song Contest; 2023	Succeeded by Hera Björk with "Scared of Heights"
