= Iceland in the Eurovision Song Contest 2022 =

- Eurovision Song Contest 2022
- Participating broadcaster: Ríkisútvarpið (RÚV)
- Country: Iceland
- Selection process: Söngvakeppnin 2022
- Selection date: 12 March 2022

Competing entry
- Song: "Með hækkandi sól"
- Artist: Systur
- Songwriters: Lovísa Elísabet Sigrúnardóttir

Placement
- Semi-final result: Qualified (10th, 103 points)
- Final result: 23rd, 20 points

Participation chronology

Iceland was represented at the Eurovision Song Contest 2022 with the song "Með hækkandi sól", written by Lovísa Elísabet Sigrúnardóttir and performed by the band Systur. The Icelandic broadcaster Ríkisútvarpið (RÚV) organised the national final Söngvakeppnin 2022 in order to select the Icelandic entry for the contest. The national final consisted of three shows: two semi-finals on 26 February and 5 March 2022 and a final on 12 March 2022.

Iceland was drawn to compete in the first semi-final of the Eurovision Song Contest which took place on 10 May 2022. Performing during the show in position 14, "Með hækkandi sól" was announced among the top 10 entries of the first semi-final and hence qualified to compete in the final. In the final, Iceland placed 23rd with 20 points. It was later revealed that the country placed 10th in the semi-final with 103 points.

== Background ==
Prior to the 2022 contest, Iceland has participated in the Eurovision Song Contest 37 times since its first entry in 1986. Iceland's best placing in the contest to this point was second, which it achieved on two occasions: in 1999 with the song "All Out of Luck" performed by Selma and in 2009 with the song "Is It True?" performed by Yohanna. Since the introduction of a semi-final to the format of the Eurovision Song Contest in 2004, Iceland has failed to qualify to the final seven times. In 2021, Iceland placed fourth in the grand final with the song "10 Years" performed by Daði og Gagnamagnið.

The Icelandic national broadcaster, Ríkisútvarpið (RÚV), broadcasts the event within Iceland and organises the selection process for the nation's entry. From 2006 to 2020, Iceland's competitor has been selected by Söngvakeppnin, a televised national competition. Daði og Gagnamagnið won Söngvakeppnin 2020 with "Think About Things". The song was considered one of the favourites to win, however the contest was cancelled due to the COVID-19 pandemic. Daði og Gagnamagnið were subsequently internally re-selected to compete in 2021 with the song "10 Years", finishing in fourth place with 378 points.

== Before Eurovision ==
=== Söngvakeppnin 2022 ===
Söngvakeppnin 2022 was the national final organised by RÚV in order to select Iceland's entry for the Eurovision Song Contest 2022. It consisted of two semi-finals on 26 February and 5 March 2022 and a final on 12 March 2022. The shows took place in the RVK Studios in Gufunes, hosted by Björg Magnúsdóttir, Jón Jónsson and Ragnhildur Steinunn Jónsdóttir.

==== Format ====
In each semi-final, five of the ten competing acts performed, and two entries determined solely by the viewing public through telephone voting progressed to the final. As per the rules of the competition, an additional optional qualifier could be selected by the contest organisers from among the non-qualifying acts, which would also progress to the final. This option was subsequently invoked by the organisers, meaning that a total of five acts qualified for the final.

In the final, two rounds of voting determined the winning song: in the first round, the votes of the viewing public through telephone voting and the votes of a seven-member international jury panel determined two entries which would progress to the second round. The public and jury each accounted for 50% of the result in the first round, with the rankings of each jury member being converted to match the total number of televotes cast by the public. In the second round a further round of televoting was held, with the winner determined by aggregating the results of the first round to the votes received in the second round.

==== Competing entries ====
Between 3 September and 6 October 2021, RÚV opened the period for interested songwriters to submit their entries. Songwriters did not have any particular requirement to meet, and the process was open to all. At the close of submissions, 158 songs had been entered. A selection committee formed under consultation with the Association of Composers (FTT) and the Icelandic Musicians' Union (FÍH) selected the ten competing entries, all of which were revealed on 5 February 2022.

Söngvakeppnin 2022 – Competing entries
Artist	Song		Songwriter(s)
Artist	Icelandic title	English title	Songwriter(s)
Amarosis	—N/a	"Don't You Know"	Már Gunnarsson, Ísold Wilberg
Haffi Haff	"Gía"	"Volcano"	Hafsteinn Þór Guðjónsson, Steinar Jónsson, Sigurður Ásgeir Árnason
Hanna Mia and The Astrotourists	"Séns með þér"	"Gemini"	Hanna Mia Brekkan, Sakaris Emil Joensen, Nína Richter
Katla	"Þaðan af"	"Then Again"	Jóhannes Damian Patreksson, Kristinn Óli S. Haraldsson, Hafsteinn Þráinsson, Snorri Beck
Markéta Irglová	"Mögulegt"	"Possible"	Markéta Irglová, Sturla Mio Þórisson
Reykjavíkurdætur (Daughters of Reykjavík)	"Tökum af stað"	"Turn This Around"	Ragnhildur Jónasdóttir, Salka Valsdóttir, Steinunn Jónsdóttir, Þuríður Blær Jóhannsdóttir, Þuríður Kr Kristleifsdóttir
Sigga, Beta and Elín	"Með hækkandi sól"	—N/a	Lovísa Elísabet Sigrúnardóttir
Stefán Óli	"Ljósið"	"All I Know"	Andri Þór Jónsson, Birgir Steinn Stefánsson, Stefán Hilmarsson
Stefanía Svavarsdóttir	"Hjartað mitt"	"Heart of Mine"	Halldór Gunnar Pálsson, Magnús Þór Sigmundsson
Suncity and Sanna	"Hækkum í botn"	"Keep It Cool"	Sveinn Rúnar Sigurðsson, Valgeir Magnússon, Davíð Guðbrandsson, Sanna Martinez, Anders Eriksson, Mark Caplice

==== Semi-finals ====
Two semi-finals took place on 26 February 2022 and 5 March 2022. In each semi-final, five of the ten competing acts performed, and two entries determined solely by the viewing public through telephone voting progressed to the final. In addition to the performances of the competing entries, a number of guest performances also featured during the two shows. The first semi-final featured a performance from the Icelandic electronic rock band GusGus and Margrét Rán, who performed a rendition of the 2009 Icelandic Eurovision entry "Is It True?". The second semi-final featured a performance from Icelandic singer and actress GDRN, who performed the 2003 Icelandic Eurovision entry "Open Your Heart". In addition, an optional qualifier was selected by the contest organisers from among the non-qualifying acts, which also progressed to the final.

Semi-final 1 – 26 February 2022
R/O	Artist	Song	Votes	Place	Result
1	Amarosis	"Don’t You Know"	7,006	3	Wildcard
2	Stefán Óli	"Ljósið"	7,017	2	Finalist
3	Haffi Haff	"Gía"	4,828	5	Eliminated
4	Stefanía Svavarsdóttir	"Hjartað mitt"	5,613	4	Eliminated
5	Sigga, Beta and Elín	"Með hækkandi sól"	10,788	1	Finalist

Semi-final 2 – 5 March 2022
R/O	Artist	Song	Votes	Place	Result
1	Markéta Irglová	"Mögulegt"	3,251	4	Eliminated
2	Suncity and Sanna	"Hækkum í botn"	4,170	3	Eliminated
3	Reykjavíkurdætur	"Tökum af stað"	13,137	1	Finalist
4	Katla	"Þaðan af"	5,251	2	Finalist
5	Hanna Mia and The Astrotourists	"Séns með þér"	3,197	5	Eliminated

==== Final ====
The final took place on 12 March 2022 and featured the four qualifiers and the wildcard from the semi-finals. It was later revealed that the songs in the final would be performed in the language they would be performing in case they represent the country in Eurovision. Thus, three of the finalists, namely Stefan Oli, Sigga, Beta and Elín, and Katla, decided to perform the Icelandic version of their entries, while Reykjavíkurdætur performed a bilingual version of their entry in both English and Icelandic, and Amarosis decided to perform their entry in English. In addition to the competing entries, the show was opened by Birgitta Haukdal, together with Katla Margrét Þorgeirsdóttir, Guðjón Davíð Karlsson, Þórey Birgisdóttir, Björg Magnúsdóttir, Jón Jónsson, Ragnhildur Steinunn Jónsdóttir, and Þröstur Leó Gunnarsson. Moreover, Daði Freyr, who represented Iceland in the Eurovision Song Contest 2021 together with Gagnamagnið, performed as an interval act. The 2021 Ukrainian representatives Go_A were set to feature as guest performers, however, due to the Russian invasion of Ukraine resulting in the band's inability to travel to Iceland, the 2021 Swedish representative Tusse performed in the final instead. Both Freyr and Tusse were also part of the jury panel.

Final – First round – 12 March 2022
R/O	Artist	Song	Jury	Televote	Total	Place	Result
1	Katla	"Þaðan af"	15,031	5,972	21,003	5	Eliminated
2	Amarosis	"Don't You Know"	11,921	12,506	24,427	3	Eliminated
3	Reykjavíkurdætur	"Turn This Around"	19,437	26,320	45,757	1	Advanced
4	Stefán Óli	"Ljósið"	13,476	9,126	22,602	4	Eliminated
5	Sigga, Beta and Elín	"Með hækkandi sól"	18,141	24,083	42,224	2	Advanced

Detailed jury votes
R/O	Song	Juror							Total
R/O	Song	1	2	3	4	5	6	7	Total
1	"Þaðan af"	2,591	1,814	1,814	2,591	1,555	2,073	2,591	15,031
2	"Don't You Know"	1,555	2,073	1,555	1,555	1,814	1,814	1,555	11,921
3	"Turn This Around"	1,814	3,110	3,110	2,073	3,110	3,110	3,110	19,437
4	"Ljósið"	2,073	1,555	2,073	1,814	2,591	1,555	1,814	13,476
5	"Með hækkandi sól"	3,110	2,591	2,591	3,110	2,073	2,591	2,073	18,141

Jury members (sorted by country)
- Finland: Heidi Välkkilä
- Iceland: Daði Freyr
- Iceland: Ragnheiður Gröndal
- Iceland: Sóley Stefánsdóttir
- Netherlands: Barry van Cornewal
- Norway: Stig Karlsen
- Sweden: Tusse

Final – Second round – 12 March 2022
R/O	Artist	Song	Votes			Place
R/O	Artist	Song	Round 1	Round 2	Total	Place
1	Reykjavíkurdætur	"Turn This Around"	45,757	23,470	69,227	2
2	Sigga, Beta and Elín	"Með hækkandi sól"	42,224	35,156	77,380	1

== At Eurovision ==
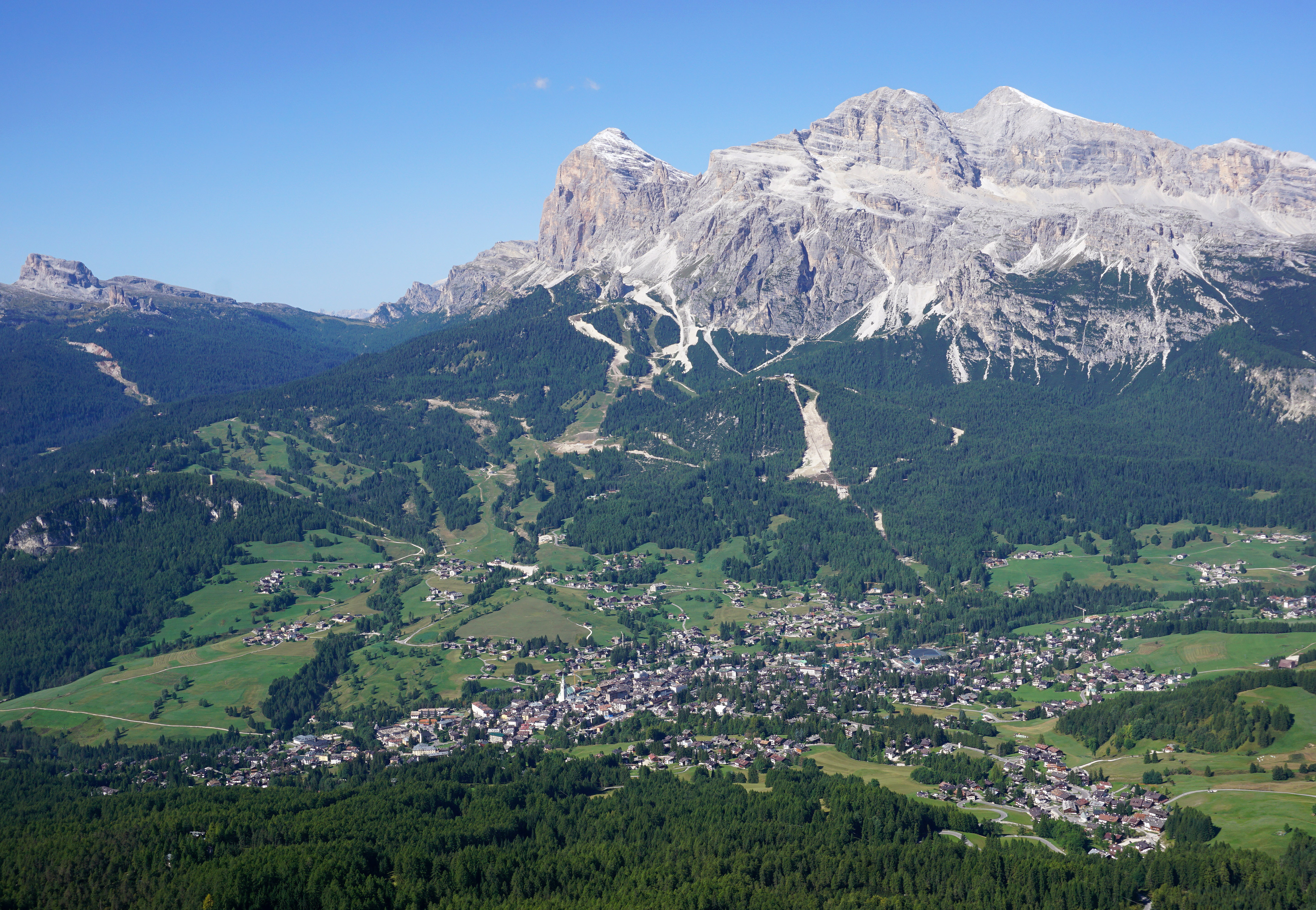
A video postcard introduced the trio's performance in the first semi-final and final of the Eurovision Song Contest 2022. The postcard was filmed in the Italian commune of Cortina d'Ampezzo in the Province of Belluno and featured virtual projections of Systur across the location.

According to Eurovision rules, all nations with the exceptions of the host country and the "Big Five" (France, Germany, Italy, Spain and the United Kingdom) are required to qualify from one of two semi-finals in order to compete for the final; the top ten countries from each semi-final progress to the final. The European Broadcasting Union (EBU) split up the competing countries into six different pots based on voting patterns from previous contests, with countries with favourable voting histories put into the same pot. On 25 January 2022, an allocation draw was held which placed each country into one of the two semi-finals, as well as which half of the show they would perform in. Iceland was placed into the first semi-final, which was held on 10 May 2022, and was scheduled to perform in the second half of the show.

Once all the competing songs for the 2022 contest had been released, the running order for the semi-finals was decided by the shows' producers rather than through another draw, so that similar songs were not placed next to each other. Iceland was set to perform in position 14, following the entry from the Austria and before the entry from Greece. Immediately after the close of the first semi-final, a press conference was held in which each of the artists drew the half of the final of which they would perform in. Iceland was drawn into the second half of the final and was later selected by the EBU to perform in position number 18, following the entry from Greece and before the entry from Moldova.

In Iceland, all shows were broadcast on RÚV and RÚV 2, with commentary by Gísli Marteinn Baldursson. The Icelandic spokesperson, who announced the top 12-point score awarded by the Icelandic jury during the final, was Árný Fjóla Ásmundsdóttir, who previously represented Iceland in the Eurovision Song Contest 2021 as a part of Daði og Gagnamagnið.

=== Semi-final ===
Systur took part in technical rehearsals on 1 and 5 May, followed by dress rehearsals on 9 and 10 May. This included the jury show on 9 May where the professional juries of each country watched and voted on the competing entries.

The Icelandic performance featured Systur and a backing piano singer who happened to be the brother of the three frontwomen. The performance remained intimate and similar to that of the national final, with all three sisters static throughout the song with guitars. Towards the end of the performance, LED light screens in the background grew golden from white.

At the end of the show, Iceland was announced as having finished in the top 10 and subsequently qualifying for the grand final. This marked the third consecutive qualification to the final for Iceland. It was later revealed that Systur placed tenth in the semi-final, receiving a total of 103 points: 39 points from the televoting and 64 points from the juries.

=== Final ===
Shortly after the first semi-final, a winners' press conference was held for the ten qualifying countries. As part of this press conference, the qualifying artists took part in a draw to determine which half of the grand final they would subsequently participate in. This draw was done in the order the countries appeared in the semi-final running order. Iceland was drawn to compete in the second half. Following this draw, the shows' producers decided upon the running order of the final, as they had done for the semi-finals. Iceland was subsequently placed to perform in position 18, following the entry from Greece and before the entry from Moldova.

Systur once again took part in dress rehearsals on 13 and 14 May before the final, including the jury final where the professional juries cast their final votes before the live show. They performed a repeat of their semi-final performance during the final on 14 May. Iceland placed twenty-third in the final, scoring 20 points: 10 points from the televoting and 10 points from the juries.

=== Voting ===
Below is a breakdown of points awarded to Iceland during the first semi-final and final. Voting during the three shows involved each country awarding two sets of points from 1–8, 10 and 12: one from their professional jury and the other from televoting. The exact composition of the professional jury, and the results of each country's jury and televoting were released after the final; the individual results from each jury member were also released in an anonymised form. The Icelandic jury consisted of Erna, Kristján Gíslason, Lydía Grétarsdóttir, Stefán Hjörleifsson, and Sóley. In the first semi-final, Iceland finished in tenth place out of seventeen entries, marking Iceland's third consecutive qualification to the grand final. Over the course of the contest, Iceland awarded its 12 points to Norway (jury) and Ukraine (televote) in the first semi-final and Sweden (jury) and Ukraine (televote) in the final.

==== Points awarded to Iceland ====
Points awarded to Iceland (Semi-final 1)
Score	Televote	Jury
12 points		
10 points		Portugal
8 points	Ukraine	Latvia
7 points	Denmark; Norway	
6 points		Switzerland
5 points	Latvia	Albania; Netherlands
4 points	Netherlands	Croatia; Denmark; France; Lithuania; Ukraine
3 points	France	Armenia; Moldova
2 points	Lithuania; Portugal	Austria; Norway
1 point	Switzerland	

Points awarded to Iceland (Final)
Score	Televote	Jury
12 points		
10 points		
8 points	Ukraine	
7 points		
6 points		Portugal
5 points		
4 points		
3 points		
2 points	Denmark	Lithuania
1 points		Denmark; Ireland

==== Points awarded by Iceland ====
Points awarded by Iceland (Semi-final 1)
Score	Televote	Jury
12 points	Ukraine	Norway
10 points	Norway	Ukraine
8 points	Netherlands	Lithuania
7 points	Moldova	Netherlands
6 points	Denmark	Portugal
5 points	Lithuania	Switzerland
4 points	Austria	Latvia
3 points	Armenia	Armenia
2 points	Portugal	Greece
1 point	Switzerland	Denmark

Points awarded by Iceland (Final)
Score	Televote	Jury
12 points	Ukraine	Sweden
10 points	Norway	Ukraine
8 points	Sweden	Norway
7 points	United Kingdom	United Kingdom
6 points	Moldova	Italy
5 points	Netherlands	Portugal
4 points	Poland	Netherlands
3 points	Spain	Spain
2 points	Lithuania	Czech Republic
1 point	Serbia	Lithuania

==== Detailed voting results ====
The following members comprised the Icelandic jury:

- Erna – Singer-songwriter
- Kristján Gíslason – Music producer, singer, represented Iceland in the Eurovision Song Contest 2001
- Lydía Grétarsdóttir – Singer-songwriter
- Stefán Hjörleifsson – Musician, stage director
- Sóley – Singer-songwriter, instrumentalist, producer

Detailed voting results from Iceland (Semi-final 1)
R/O	Country	Jury							Televote	
R/O	Country	Juror 1	Juror 2	Juror 3	Juror 4	Juror 5	Rank	Points	Rank	Points
01	Albania	8	15	10	14	16	14		16	
02	Latvia	5	3	14	9	8	7	4	11	
03	Lithuania	11	8	3	1	3	3	8	6	5
04	Switzerland	15	4	5	5	9	6	5	10	1
05	Slovenia	16	16	12	15	15	16		15	
06	Ukraine	3	2	2	2	4	2	10	1	12
07	Bulgaria	14	12	8	13	12	13		12	
08	Netherlands	1	6	7	6	5	4	7	3	8
09	Moldova	10	13	16	16	11	15		4	7
10	Portugal	7	7	6	3	2	5	6	9	2
11	Croatia	12	10	9	11	13	12		14	
12	Denmark	13	9	13	8	7	10	1	5	6
13	Austria	6	11	15	10	14	11		7	4
14	Iceland									
15	Greece	4	14	11	7	6	9	2	13	
16	Norway	2	1	1	4	1	1	12	2	10
17	Armenia	9	5	4	12	10	8	3	8	3

Detailed voting results from Iceland (Final)
R/O	Country	Jury							Televote	
R/O	Country	Juror 1	Juror 2	Juror 3	Juror 4	Juror 5	Rank	Points	Rank	Points
01	Czech Republic	2	10	15	21	15	9	2	20	
02	Romania	19	21	16	16	23	21		18	
03	Portugal	11	5	11	8	2	6	5	14	
04	Finland	13	14	18	13	24	20		16	
05	Switzerland	23	8	12	12	14	14		15	
06	France	14	20	23	14	11	18		21	
07	Norway	5	4	1	4	4	3	8	2	10
08	Armenia	15	9	14	15	12	15		22	
09	Italy	9	6	4	2	16	5	6	12	
10	Spain	4	12	10	7	20	8	3	8	3
11	Netherlands	6	7	8	9	6	7	4	6	5
12	Ukraine	3	3	9	1	1	2	10	1	12
13	Germany	21	17	22	20	19	22		19	
14	Lithuania	16	11	6	11	7	10	1	9	2
15	Azerbaijan	20	23	19	22	21	23		24	
16	Belgium	17	18	20	6	18	16		13	
17	Greece	10	15	13	19	8	13		23	
18	Iceland									
19	Moldova	24	22	24	17	22	24		5	6
20	Sweden	1	2	2	5	3	1	12	3	8
21	Australia	18	19	5	10	9	11		17	
22	United Kingdom	8	1	3	3	5	4	7	4	7
23	Poland	22	13	7	18	10	12		7	4
24	Serbia	7	24	21	23	17	17		10	1
25	Estonia	12	16	17	24	13	19		11	
