= Systur =

Icelandic folk band

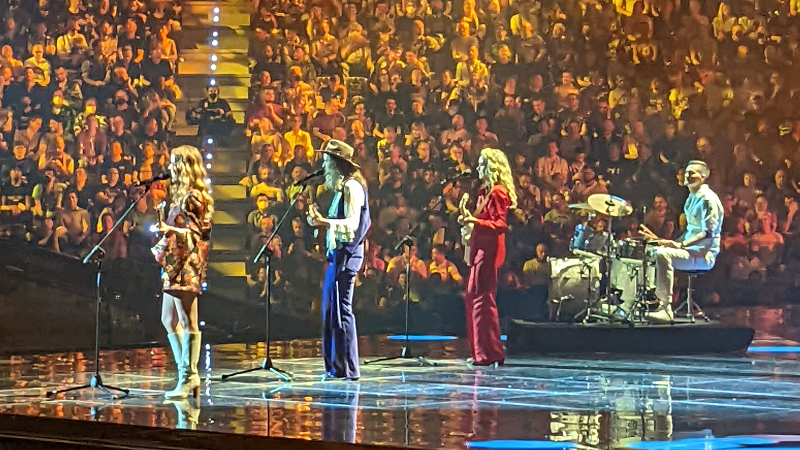
- Systur performing at the first semi-final of the Eurovision Song Contest 2022 in May 2022

Background information
- Also known as: Sigga, Beta & Elín; Tripolia
- Origin: Reykjavík, Iceland
- Genres: Folk music
- Years active: 2011–present
- Members: Sigríður Eyþórsdóttir; Elísabet Eyþórsdóttir; Elín Eyþórsdóttir

Systur (Icelandic pronunciation: [ˈsɪstʏr]; lit. 'Sisters'), also known as Sigga, Beta & Elín and formerly Tripolia, are an Icelandic band consisting of sisters Sigríður, Elísabet and Elín Eyþórsdóttir. They represented Iceland in the Eurovision Song Contest 2022 in Turin, Italy with the song "Með hækkandi sól", after winning the Icelandic national selection Söngvakeppnin 2022.

The sisters have previously partnered with DJ Friðfinnur "Oculus" Sigurðsson, with whom they formed the house band Sísý Ey in 2011.

== History ==
Sigríður, Elísabet and Elín Eyþórsdóttir grew up in Vesturbær and Grafarvogur, Reykjavík. Their mother is singer Ellen Kristjánsdóttir, and their father is composer and keyboardist Eyþór Gunnarsson of the band Mezzoforte. The sisters began their musical career in 2011 as part of the band Sísý Ey, which they named after their grandmother. Sísý Ey released its debut single "Ain't Got Nobody" in 2013, and partnered with British house label Defected Records for "Do It Good" in 2015 and "Mystified" in 2018. They performed at the Glastonbury Festival in 2016.

In 2017, they released their first single as a trio, titled "Bounce from the Bottom", under the Tripolia alias.

Outside of music, they are trans rights activists, particularly for transgender children. Elín is engaged to Icelandic actress Íris Tanja Flygenring.

=== 2022: Eurovision Song Contest ===
On 5 February 2022, Sigga, Beta & Elín were announced as one of the ten acts that had been selected by RÚV to compete in the upcoming edition of Söngvakeppnin, the Icelandic national selection for the Eurovision Song Contest. They performed their entry "Með hækkandi sól" in the first semi-final on 26 February, and advanced to the final on 12 March. They went on to win the competition, beating Reykjavíkurdætur in the superfinal, and thereby won the right to represent Iceland in the Eurovision Song Contest 2022 in Turin, Italy. At Eurovision, they qualified for the grand final and placed 23rd.

== Discography ==
=== Singles ===
Title	Year	Peak chart positions		Album or EP
Title	Year	ICE	LTU	Album or EP
"Bounce from the Bottom" (as Tripolia)	2017	—	—	Non-album single
"Með hækkandi sól"	2022	1	38	Söngvakeppnin 2022
"Dusty Road"	2022	—	—	Non-album singles
"Goodbye"	2022	—	—	Non-album singles
"Furðuverur"	2023	—	—	Non-album singles
"Conversations" (with Kasper Bjørke and Sísý Ey)	2024	—	—	Puzzles
"—" denotes a single that did not chart or was not released.

==== As part of Sísý Ey ====
Title	Year	Album
"Ain't Got Nobody"	2013	Non-album singles
"Do It Good"	2015	Non-album singles
"Mystified"	2017	Non-album singles
"Restless"	2018	Non-album singles

=== Non-single album appearances ===
Title	Year	Album
"Apart" (Kasper Bjørke feat. Sísý Ey)	2014	After Forever
"Running" (Hercules and Love Affair feat. Sísý Ey)	2017	Omnion

Awards and achievements
Preceded by Daði og Gagnamagnið with "10 Years"	Iceland in the Eurovision Song Contest; 2022	Succeeded by Diljá with "Power"
