= Væb =

Icelandic electronic music duo

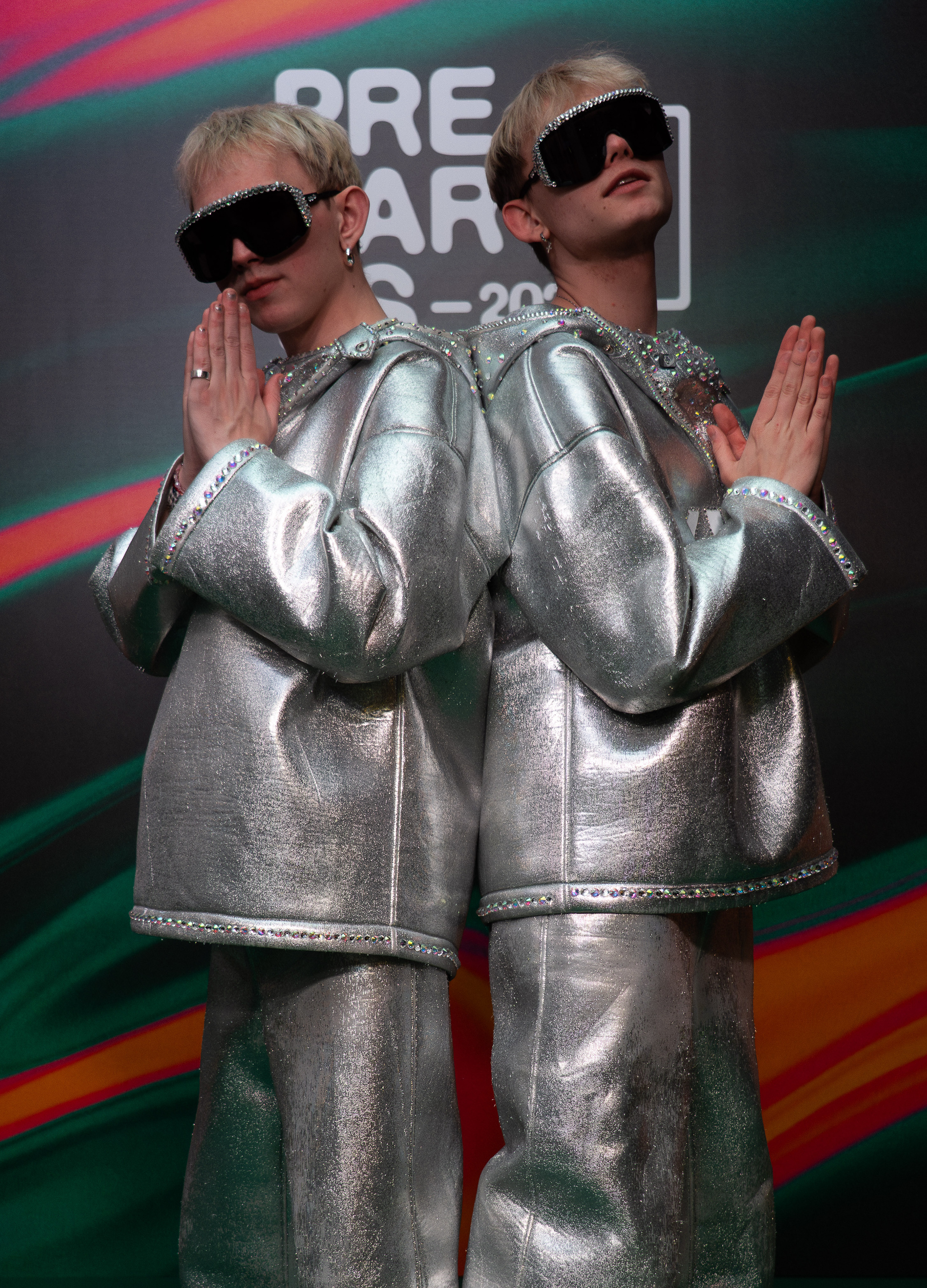
- Væb in 2025. Pictured: Matthías (left) and Hálfdán (right)

Background information
- Origin: Kópavogur, Iceland
- Years active: 2022–present
- Label: Alda Music
- Members: Hálfdán Helgi Matthíasson; Matthías Davíð Matthíasson
- Website: væb.is

Væb (stylised in all caps; pronounced [ˈvai:b], 'vibe') is an Icelandic electronic music duo consisting of brothers Hálfdán Helgi Matthíasson (born 4 June 2003) and Matthías Davíð Matthíasson (born 7 December 2004). The duo represented Iceland in the Eurovision Song Contest 2025 with the song "Róa", where they finished 25th overall with 33 points. They also won the 2025 Sögur Children's Award Festival's Performer of the Year award.

== History ==
Hálfdán and Matthías are two of six siblings born in Kópavogur, Iceland. Their mother participated in the 2008 Söngvakeppnin, with the song "Lífsins leið". Hálfdán won the Icelandic singing competition The Christmas Star in 2015, while Matthías appeared in the 2020 television series Eurogarðurinn and voiced Nemo in the Icelandic dub of Finding Dory. During the COVID-19 pandemic in 2020, the two brothers recorded and edited church services for Lindakirkja in Kópavogur, their local church, and live streamed funerals for mourners affected by lockdown restrictions. They formed Væb in 2022 after posting a comedy song on TikTok, "Aron Can (Borðar kál)" lit. 'Aron Can eating cabbage', and deciding to release it on Spotify. They took their name from an acronym of the Icelandic words virðing, æðruleysi, and bullandistemming, meaning respect, serenity, and good atmosphere.

In early 2024, Væb participated in that year's Söngvakeppnin, the national selection method for the Eurovision Song Contest, with the song "Bíómynd". They won their semi-final and placed fourth overall. "Bíómynd" was subsequently nominated for the 2024 Sögur Children's Award Festival's Lyrics of the Year and Song of the Year awards. Væb then won the following year's Söngvakeppnin in February 2025 with "Róa". The song was described as a "a synth-driven pop track with Icelandic lyrics" by Iceland Review. By the time of the latter, they had signed to Alda Music and had released the album Vaeb Tékk and the EP Vaebauer. They subsequently launched a line of Ash Wednesday costumes based on their outfits, which sold out immediately. They then set up a pop-up store in Kringlan Mall.

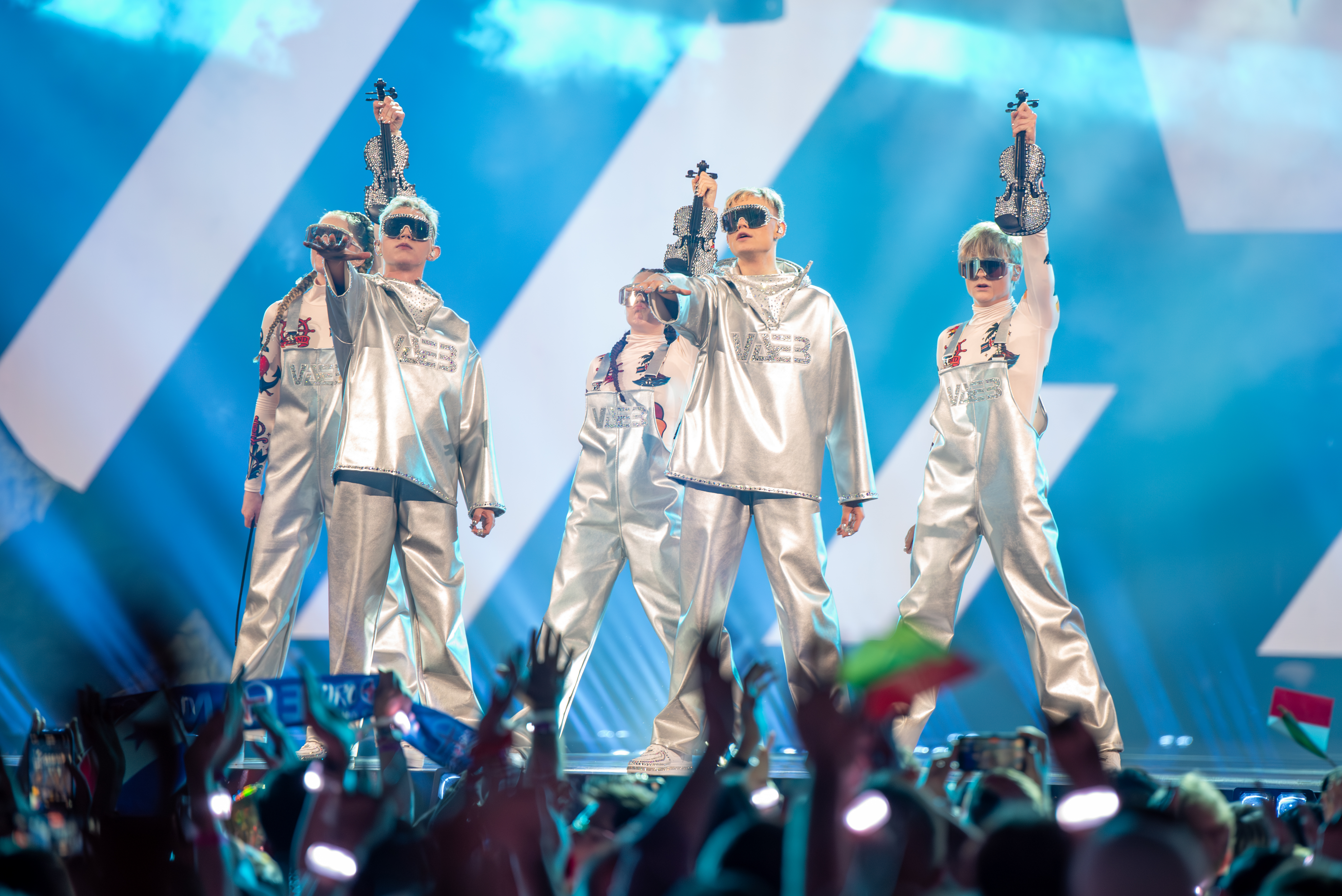
Væb competing at Eurovision

In March 2025, both Væb and 5miinust, the 2024 Estonian entry for Eurovision, participated in a fundraiser live stream organised by Eurovision YouTuber ESC Gabe, to help raise money for Ukraine in the ongoing Russian invasion. During the stream, they played a Eurovision trivia game, ranked the contest's Icelandic entries, performed karaoke, reviewed fan art, and raised US$3,952. At the first semi-final of the Eurovision Song Contest 2025, they placed sixth and qualified for the final, where they came 25th. At the 2025 Sögur Children's Award Festival, "Róa" was nominated for Song of the Year and Væb won Performer of the Year.

On 17 April 2026, Væb released their album “Væbout”.

Væb was asked to create and perform a song for the Children's culture festival in Reykjavik 2026. The lyrics were based on responses from 4th graders of the schools in Reykjavik about what they thought empathy and community meant, the resulting song was "Sama hver það er" ("No matter who it is") which they performed for the opening ceremony at Harpa which was streamed live on local television.

== Discography ==
=== Studio albums ===
Title	Details
Væb tékk	Released: 8 September 2022; Label: Alda Music; Formats: Digital download, streaming
Væbout	Released: 17 April 2026; Label: Alda Music; Formats: Digital download, streaming

=== Extended plays ===
Title	Details
Væbauer (with Ingi Bauer)	Released: 25 July 2024; Label: Alda Music; Formats: Digital download, streaming

=== Singles ===
==== As lead artist ====
Title	Year	Peak chart positions									Album or EP	Ref.
Title	Year	ICE	AUT	LTU	NLD	NOR	SWE	SWI	UK Down.	UK Sales	Album or EP	Ref.
"Aron Can (Borðar kál)"	2022	—	—	—	—	—	—	—	—	—	Væb tékk	
"Þetta kallar á drykk"	2022	—	—	—	—	—	—	—	—	—	Væb tékk	
"Ríðum ríðum" (with Háski and Rokkkór Íslands)	2022	—	—	—	—	—	—	—	—	—	Non-album singles	
"Alveg dagsatt" (with Villi Neto, Reynir, and Barnakór Lindakirkju)	2022	—	—	—	—	—	—	—	—	—	Non-album singles	
"Ofboðslega frægur (Remix)" (with Ingi Bauer)	2023	17	—	—	—	—	—	—	—	—	Non-album singles	
"Tölur tala" (featuring Herra Hnetusmjör)	2023	21	—	—	—	—	—	—	—	—	Non-album singles	
"Sömmer Baby" (with Lil Curly)	2023	—	—	—	—	—	—	—	—	—	Non-album singles	
"Ég er á leiðinni (Remix)"	2023	—	—	—	—	—	—	—	—	—	Non-album singles	
"Bíómynd"	2024	10	—	—	—	—	—	—	—	—	Non-album singles	
"Bíómynd (Remix)"	2024	—	—	—	—	—	—	—	—	—	Non-album singles	
"Movie Scene" (English version of Bíómynd)	2024	—	—	—	—	—	—	—	—	—	Non-album singles	
"Til hamingju"	2024	—	—	—	—	—	—	—	—	—		
"Róa"	2025	1	40	28	57	50	9	12	32	33	Væbout	
"Jaja Ding Dong (Remix)" (with Ingi Bauer)	2025	—	—	—	—	—	—	—	—	—	Non-album single	
"Dr. Saxophone"	2025	—	—	—	—	—	—	—	—	—	Væbout	
"Þetta reddast"	2026	—	—	—	—	—	—	—	—	—	Væbout	
"Gamerboi" (featuring Dóttir.x)	2026	—	—	—	—	—	—	—	—		Væbout	
"—" denotes a recording that did not chart or was not released in that territory. "*" denotes a chart that did not exist at that time.

==== As featured artist ====
Title	Year	Album or EP	Ref.
"Macarena gella" (Rjóminn featuring Væb)	2023	Non-album singles	
"Stemning" (Stefán Berg featuring Væb)	2024	Non-album singles	
"Fullur" (Blackout Bois featuring Væb)	2024	Non-album singles	
"Sótt honum" (Sniglabandið featuring Sprinklr and Væb)	2025	Non-album singles	
"Cashnúna" (Gulli featuring Væb)	2025	Húsið og ég, Vol. 2	
"Lagið um það sem er bannað" (Ragga Holm featuring Væb)	2026	Non-album singles	
"Sama hver það er" (Barnamenningarhátíðar í Reykjavík featuring Væb)	2026	Non-album singles	

=== Other collaborations ===
Title	Year	Album or EP	Ref.
"Kóngur í einn dag" (with Villi Neto)	2024	Portú Galinn	
"Sem kóngur ríkti hann" (with Villi Neto)	2024	Portú Galinn	
"Side Quest King" (English Version) (HOYO-MiX featuring Væb)	2026	Side Quest King (Honkai: Star Rail Third; Anniversary Theme Song)	

== Awards and nominations ==
Year	Award	Category	Nominee(s)	Result	Ref.
2024	Sögur Children's Award Festival	Lyrics of the Year	"Bíómynd"	Nominated	
2024	Sögur Children's Award Festival	Song of the Year	"Bíómynd"	Nominated	
2025	Sögur Children's Award Festival	Performer of the Year	Themselves	Won	
2025	Sögur Children's Award Festival	Song of the Year	"Róa"	Nominated	
2025	Eurovision Awards	Miss Congeniality	Themselves	Nominated	
2025	Eurovision Awards	#ALBM Cover of the Year	Themselves	Nominated	

Awards and achievements
Preceded by Hera Björk with "Scared of Heights"	Iceland in the Eurovision Song Contest; 2025	Succeeded by Incumbent
