= Róa =

2025 single by Væb

Single by Væb

from the album Væbout
- Released: 17 January 2025
- Genre: Electrofolk
- Length: 2:42
- Label: Alda
- Composers: Gunnar Björn Gunnarsson; Hálfdán Helgi Matthíasson; Ingi Þór Garðarsson; Matthías Davíð Matthíasson
- Lyricists: Hálfdán Helgi Matthíasson; Ingi Þór Garðarsson; Matthías Davíð Matthíasson
- Producers: Matthías Davíð Matthíasson; Ingi Bauer

Væb singles chronology
"Til hamingju" (2024)	"Róa" (2025)	"Sótt honum" (2025)

Music video
- "Róa" on YouTube

Eurovision Song Contest 2025 entry
- Country: Iceland
- Artist: Væb
- Language: Icelandic
- Composers: Gunnar Björn Gunnarsson; Hálfdán Helgi Matthíasson; Ingi Þór Garðarsson; Matthías Davíð Matthíasson
- Lyricists: Hálfdán Helgi Matthíasson; Ingi Þór Garðarsson; Matthías Davíð Matthíasson

Finals performance
- Semi-final result: 6th
- Semi-final points: 97
- Final result: 25th
- Final points: 33

Entry chronology
- ◄ "Scared of Heights" (2024)

Official performance video
- "Róa" (First Semi-Final) on YouTube "Róa" (Grand Final) on YouTube

"Róa" (stylised as "RÓA"; pronounced [ˈrouːa]; transl. "Row") is a song by Icelandic electronic music duo Væb. The song was released on 17 January 2025 through Alda Music and was written by Gunnar Björn Gunnarsson, Hálfdán Helgi Matthíasson, Ingi Þór Garðarsson, and Matthías Davíð Matthíasson. It represented Iceland in the Eurovision Song Contest 2025, where it placed 25th in the grand final with 33 points.

The song describes the story of frogs climbing a mountain, with an encouraging message to persist through hard times. Both the song and its Eurovision performance received mixed reception from international and Eurovision-related media outlets. The song's high-energy musical composition was both praised and criticised in various reviews; additionally, some from international media found the lyrics to lack meaningful depth. "Róa" enjoyed commercial success in its native Iceland, peaking at number one. The song additionally peaked within the top ten in Sweden.

== Background and composition ==
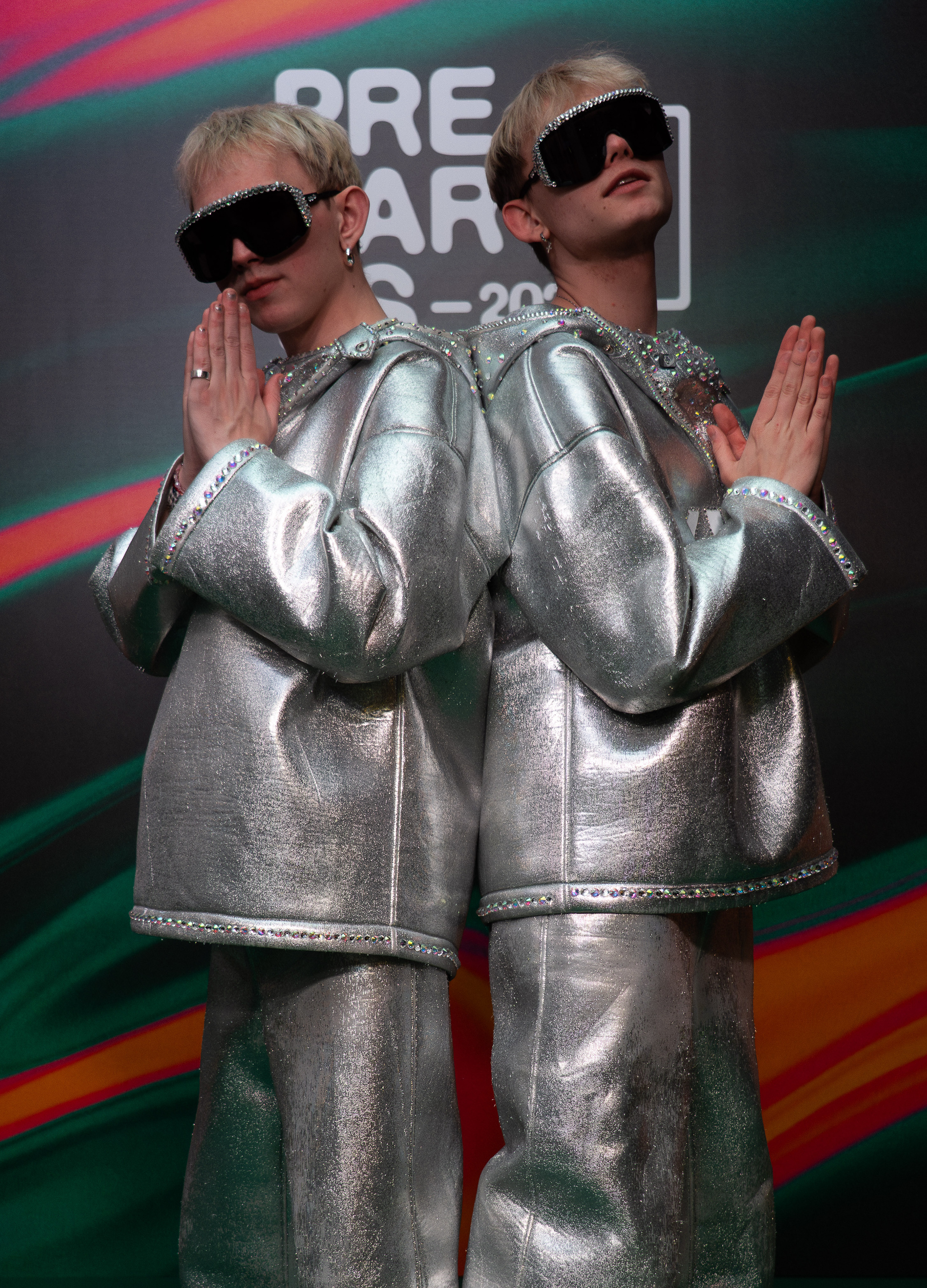
"Róa" is sung and co-written by the members of Icelandic musical duo Væb (Matthías on left, Hálfdán on right).

"Róa" was written by the members of the musical duo Væb (Hálfdán Helgi Matthíasson and Matthías Davíð Matthíasson) alongside Ingi Þór Garðarsson and Gunnar Björn Gunnarsson, with production handled by Matthías and Ingi Bauer. In an interview with Morgunblaðið, the duo, who consider themselves Christians, compared the song's story to the story of Jesus calming the storm, which describes Jesus' miracle of calming a stormy sea while upon a boat on the Sea of Galilee with his disciples. The first draft of the song was written by Gunnarsson and Garðarsson, who collaborated to create the song's main melody. According to Gunnarson, his version of the song told the story of a journey of two pirates; the song was eventually shelved until the members of Væb found it and requested changes to create an entry for Söngvakeppnin 2025, Iceland's national competition to select its entrant for the Eurovision Song Contest 2025. The song was released on 17 January 2025 through Alda Music alongside all other songs competing in Söngvakeppnin 2025. The cover artwork for "Róa" was designed by Arnfinnur Sigmundsson.

The band describes "Róa" as a story that encourages persistence through hard times. In an interview with RÚV, the duo stated that the song's lyrics tell the story of a group of frogs climbing a mountain. However, all but one frog stopped after a crowd told the frogs that they would not be able to climb the mountain. The one who persisted made it to the summit. When asked why he continued, the frog did not answer because it was deaf. The duo later stated in an interview with Iceland Review that the song's story was inspired by a story they had heard in church. The song additionally features references to the Danish territories of Greenland and the Faroe Islands alongside Icelandic television host Gísli Marteinn Baldursson, which Wiwibloggs' Ruxandra Tudor interpreted as the duo's desire to "metaphorically represent rowing toward success in the music industry". An analysis from Heimildin's Jón Trausti Reynisson stated that the song represented "the spirit of innovation, self-confidence and unbridled drive" of Generation Z.

== Music video and promotion ==
A music video directed by Óli Gunnar Gunnarsson was released on 6 February 2025. According to Vísir.is, the video was produced in the span of two days, with the video's story detailing Væb's journey throughout the Atlantic Ocean, the Faroe Islands, and Greenland, with the duo stopping at a bar to tell a bartender their story.

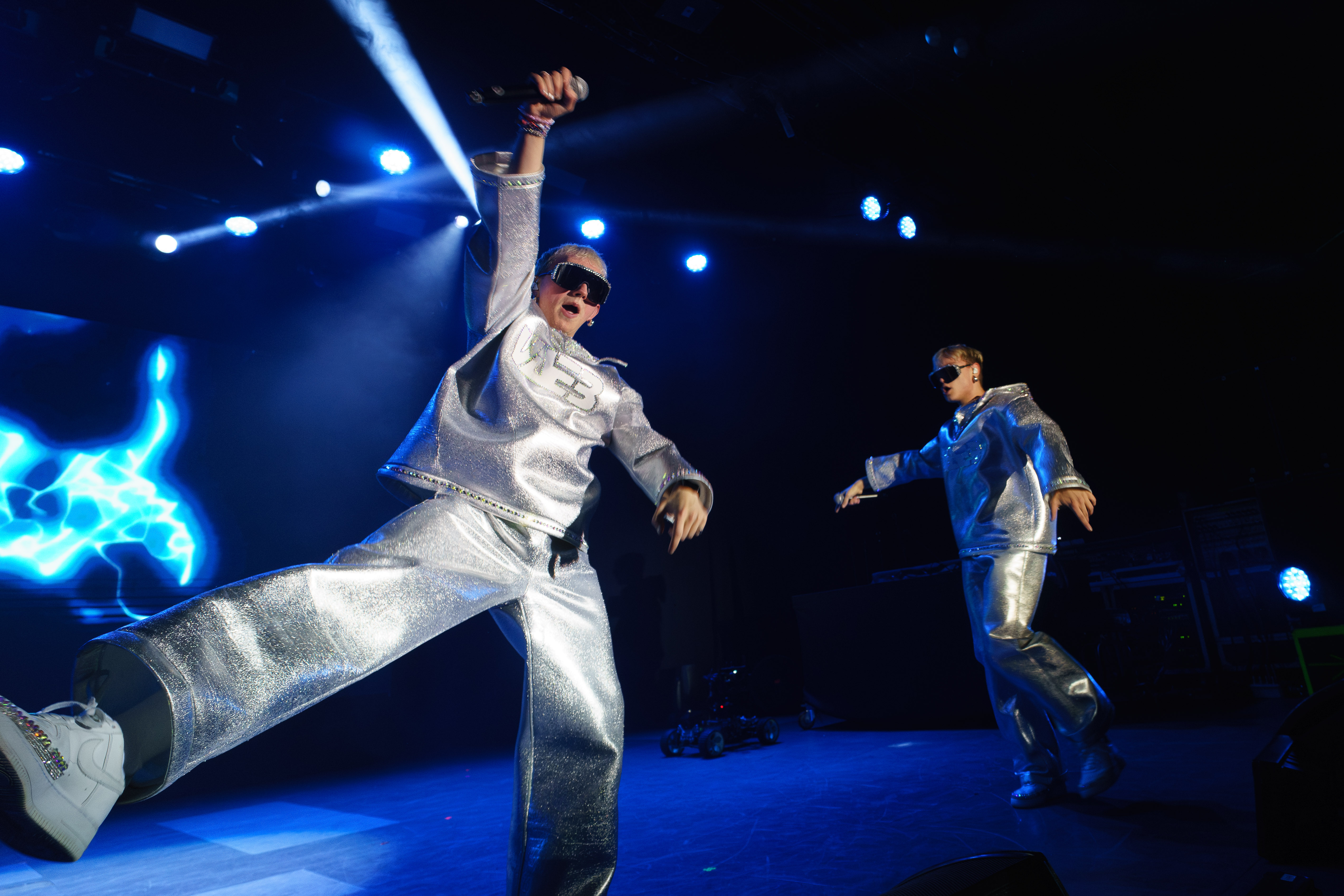
Væb performing at Pre-Party ES 2025. The duo embarked on a promotional tour prior to the contest, performing at various Eurovision pre-parties and other concerts in Iceland.

To promote the song, Væb performed it on various occasions before Eurovision. On 5 March 2025, the duo performed as part of Icelandic Ash Wednesday (known as Öskudagur) celebrations in a concert for children at the headquarters of Nói Síríus, an Icelandic chocolate company. On 25 April, they performed on an episode of Vikan með Gísla Marteini, an Icelandic talk show. The duo performed at Eurovision pre-parties during the months of March and April 2025, including the Nordic Eurovision Party on 22 March, Eurovision in Concert on 5 April, the London Eurovision Party on 13 April, and Pre-Party ES on 19 April. The duo also released a live jazz version of the song on Eurovision's YouTube channel on 31 March. Væb additionally sold replicas of their outfits at Söngvakeppnin 2025 after the duo's victory at the competition, which became a popular Öskudagur costume among children in Iceland according to Vísir.is. A week before the contest, the duo opened a pop-up store at the Kringlan Mall that sold Væb-branded merchandise.

== Critical reception ==
"Róa" received generally mixed reviews from critics. In a Wiwibloggs review containing reviews from several critics, the song was rated 5.50 out of 10 points, earning 27th out of the 37 songs competing in that year's Eurovision in the site's annual ranking. ESC Beat's Doron Lahav ranked the song 32nd overall, writing that the song was "too blended", criticising the duo's vocal abilities and the song's verses. Jon O'Brien, a writer for Vulture, ranked the song 24th overall, describing the duo as "bleached blonde, twinky siblings who've seemingly consumed their body weight in E numbers" but admitting that the duo's "sheer force of energy will no doubt send the equally hyperactive, fiddle-heavy techno to the final". However, O'Brien additionally wrote that it "may well struggle against the bangers that are far less likely to bring on a migraine". Rob Picheta, writer for American outlet CNN, ranked it 18th out of the 26 finalists in Eurovision 2025, stating that the song may "potentially [bring] a bit too much energy" to Eurovision to "shake TV viewers out of a ballad-induced slumber". The Times' Ed Potton ranked it 12th out of 26 finalists, ranking it three out of five stars and stating that the "mix of dance-pop, rapping and fiddles is ... rather rousing".

Yle's Eva Frantz gave the song a 7 out of 10 rating, writing that the upbeat electrofolk song "sits perfectly as the opening song in this year's Eurovision". Aftenposten's Robert Hoftun Gjestad rated the song 1 out of 6, criticising the duo's live vocals and fiddle elements, describing it as a "disaster of a song". NPR's Glen Weldon ranked the song tenth in his list of best songs in Eurovision 2025, proclaiming it a "particularly ravenous earworm" and a "propulsive, high-energy, inescapably danceable sea shanty". The BBC's Mark Savage criticised the song's lyrics for a lack of depth, writing a prediction that the song would not place high at Eurovision. The Daily Telegraph's Neil McCormick described the song as a "charmingly cheesy performance of bog-standard Euro techno pop fluff", comparing the duo to the Icelandic version of Irish musical duo Jedward. The Guardian's Martin Belam compared the "electric sea shanty" to a song that "could have been a massive novelty hit in the late 1990s". Harmen van Dijk, Peter van der Lint, and Nienke Schipper from Dutch newspaper Trouw highlighted Irish-inspired musical elements within "Róa", stating that the song was "a catchy tune that could well surprise on the Eurovision stage".

== Eurovision Song Contest ==
=== Söngvakeppnin 2025 ===
Iceland's national broadcaster Ríkisútvarpið (RÚV) organised Söngvakeppnin 2025, the national final to select Iceland's representative for the Eurovision Song Contest 2025. The competition featured ten songs in two semi-finals consisting of five songs each on 8 February and 15 February. The top three songs in each semi-final moved onto the grand final via a sole televote. In the grand final, the winner of the competition was determined by a 50/50 split of international juries and televoting.

Væb were officially announced as participants on 17 January 2025, being drawn to perform fifth in the first semi-final. The duo qualified, finishing in first with a total of 12,649 votes. In the grand final, they were drawn to perform in fourth. The duo earned first in both the juries and the televote, earning a split score of 74 jury points and 93 televote points for a total of 167 points, 25 more than runner-up "Set Me Free" by Stebbi Jak. As a result of winning the competition, the duo earned the right to represent Iceland at Eurovision 2025.

==== Accused plagiarism controversy ====
Prior to Söngvakeppnin 2025, Væb were accused of plagiarising "HaTunat HaShana" by Israeli singers Itay Levi and Eyal Golan in late January 2025. Shortly afterwards, the duo denied the plagiarism allegations. Following the song's victory at Söngvakeppnin 2025, Offir Cohen, the composer of "HaTunat HaShana", filed a complaint to the European Broadcasting Union (EBU), the sanctioning body for Eurovision, seeking to get the song disqualified. However, in the following month, Cohen stated to the Israeli newspaper Haaretz that he did not wish to seek the song's disqualification anymore, stating, "Mistakes happen. If tomorrow I accidentally take a melody from someone and I realize that I made a mistake, I will not fight it, I will apologize, give credit, reach an understanding ... which is what the Icelanders are doing right now."

=== At Eurovision ===
The Eurovision Song Contest 2025 took place at the St. Jakobshalle in Basel, Switzerland, and consisted of two semi-finals held on 13 and 15 May, respectively, and the final on 17 May 2025. During the allocation draw held on 28 January 2025, Iceland was drawn to compete in the first semi-final, performing in the first half of the show. Væb was later drawn to perform in first as the semi-final's opener, before Poland's Justyna Steczkowska.

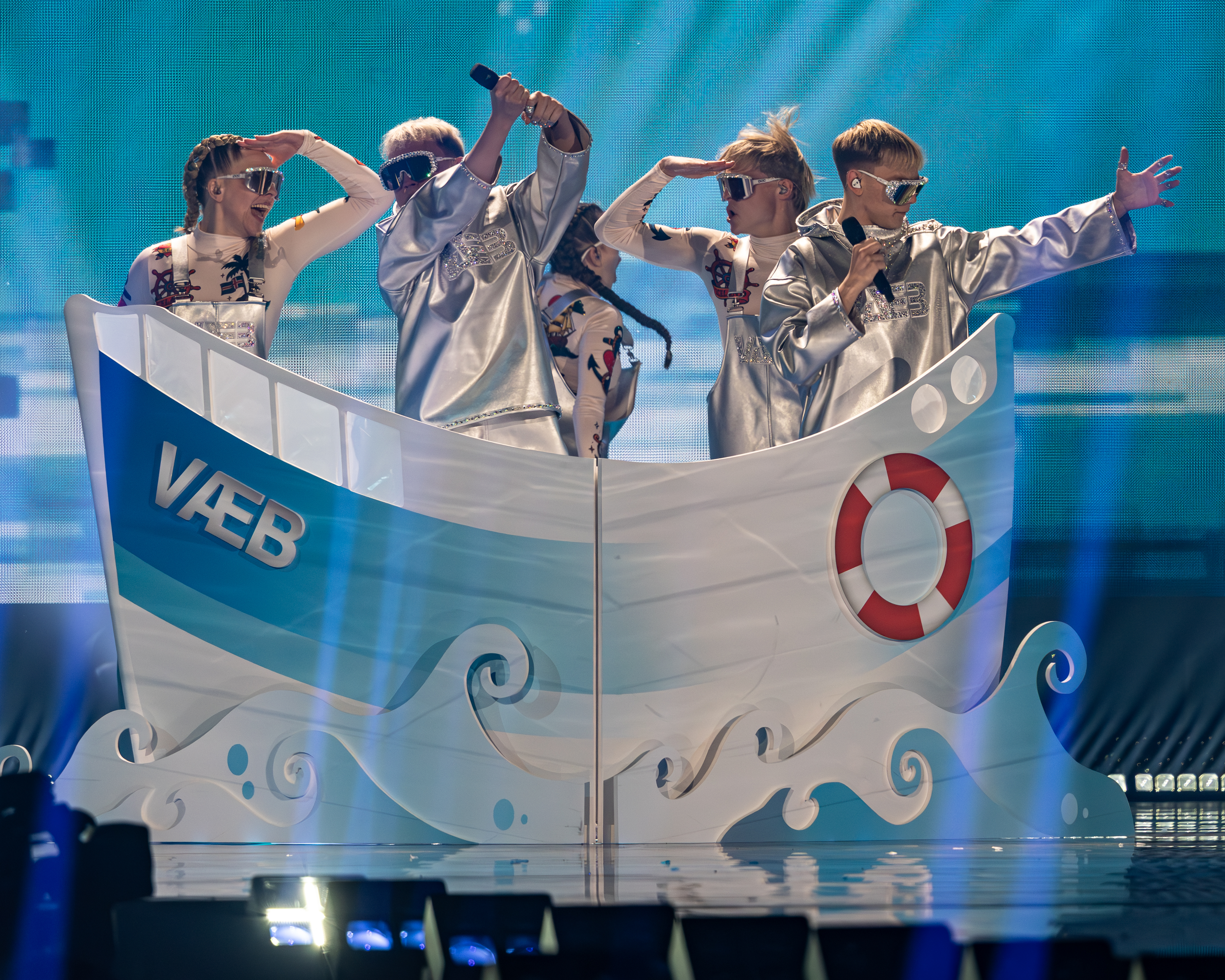
Væb alongside three backing dancers performing "Róa" at a Eurovision 2025 dress rehearsal before the grand final.

For its Eurovision performance, Selma Björnsdóttir was appointed as the staging director. The song was retained in its original language of Icelandic; according to the group, they wanted to follow statistics that stated that every song Iceland sent after 2000 that was in Icelandic qualified into the Eurovision grand final. The performance featured Væb alongside three backing dancers: Ola Getka, Baldvin Alan Thorarensen, and Úlfhildur Tómasdóttir. Additionally, Arna Rún Ómarsdóttir was also featured as a backing singer. The performance was described as an upgraded version of their performance from Söngvakeppnin 2025, with updated graphics. All five performers wore silver-coloured clothing designed by Sylvía Lovetank. The background graphics resembled "geometric landscapes" and were compared to graphics from the video game Minecraft and the 2015 film Pixels. Midway through the performance, a boat prop is assembled on stage, where the five dancers perform a choreographed routine on the boat. At the end of the performance, the duo perform a mic drop. "Róa" secured a position in the grand final, finishing in sixth in its semi-final with 97 points. The qualification was the first for Iceland since 2022.

Reactions to the performance were mixed. Special Broadcasting Service's (SBS) Alexandra Koster praised the performance for its "dash of K-pop [and] a sliver of Irish dancing", adding, "If I could have access to a time machine, I would use it to take me back approximately seven minutes so I could watch Iceland's performance again". El País' Carlos Marcos described the song as a "headache" in a live blog for Eurovision 2025, criticising the silver suits worn by the dancers. The Daily Telegraph's Neil McCormick described the performance as "charmingly cheesy", writing that Væb's costumes "look like Bill and Ben the Flowerpot Men dressed for a day at sea". The Times' Will Hodgkinson stated that the song was "a horrible start" to the first semi-final, describing the song as "a painful bit of dance pop". The Edinburgh Evening News' Benjamin Jackson stated that the Eurovision performance "seemed to lack the spark that many had hoped for", adding that "it was a disappointing outcome for a promising talent and a song that held potential".

Væb performed a repeat of their performance in the grand final on 17 May. The song performed tenth, after Austria's JJ and before Latvia's Tautumeitas. After the results were announced, the duo finished in 25th with 33 points, with a split score of 0 jury points and 33 televoting points. Regarding the former category, the highest a country ranked the song was 13th, three positions away from a points-paying placing. In the latter category, the song did not receive any of the maximum 12 points; the most a country awarded it was 10 points from Denmark. In response to their result, the duo stated to RÚV that performing at Eurovision was the "best feeling ever", proclaiming that the performance "went incredibly well" and that they were "unbelievably satisfied". In addition, they commended their televoting score and position, stating, "We did not make this song for the juries... we made it for the people... they received it very well."

== Track listing ==
Digital download/streaming

1. "Róa" – 2:42

Digital download/streaming – Axmo remix

1. "Róa" (AXMO remix) – 2:47

== Charts ==
=== Weekly charts ===
Weekly chart performance for "Róa"
Chart (2025)	Peak position
Austria (Ö3 Austria Top 40)	40
Finland (Suomen virallinen lista)	21
Greece International (IFPI)	76
Iceland (Tónlistinn)	1
Lithuania (AGATA)	28
Netherlands (Single Top 100)	57
Norway (VG-lista)	50
Sweden (Sverigetopplistan)	9
Switzerland (Schweizer Hitparade)	12
UK Singles Downloads (Official Charts)	32
UK Singles Sales (OCC)	33

=== Year-end charts ===
Year-end chart performance for "Róa"
Chart (2025)	Peak position
Iceland (Tónlistinn)	2

== Release history ==
Release history and formats for "RÓA"
Region	Date	Format(s)	Version	Label	Ref.
Various	17 January 2025	Digital download; streaming	Original	Alda	
Various	4 July 2025	Digital download; streaming	Axmo remix	Alda	
