= Drullukalt =

Studio album by Langi Seli og Skuggarnir
- Released: 2009
- Studio: Stúdíó Mix
- Genre: Rock
- Label: Mix Records

Langi Seli og Skuggarnir chronology
Rottur og kettir (1990)	Drullukalt (2009)

Drullukalt is the second studio album of Icelandic rock band Langi Seli og Skuggarnir. It was published in 2009, 19 years after the band's first album, Rottur og kettir (1990). The album art is designed by Icelandic artists Ragnar Kjartansson and Guðmundur Oddur Magnússon (Goddur).

== Track listing ==
1. Ryk og sól (3:17)
2. Bíddu eftir mér (2:51)
3. Haustið (3:21)
4. Sörfað í Sandvík (3:28)
5. Á góðum degi (2:56)
6. Drullukalt (3:07)
7. Kveðja Sporðdrekans (3:55)
8. Út að keyra (3:17)
9. Nóttin er á enda (3:10)
10. Rigning og rok (3:04)

== Critical reviews ==
Drullukalt received four stars out of a possible five in Fréttablaðið, the newspaper with the largest circulation in Iceland.
