= Daughters of Reykjavik =

Icelandic hip-hop band

Daughters of Reykjavík
- Also known as: Reykjavíkurdætur
- Origin: Reykjavík, Iceland
- Genres: Hip-Hop
- Years active: 2013–present
- Members: Karítas Óðinsdóttir (DJ); Katrín Helga Andrésdóttir; Ragnhildur Holm; Salka Valsdóttir; Steiney Skúladóttir; Steinunn Jónsdóttir; Þórdís Björk Þorfinnsdóttir; Þura Stína Kristleifsdóttir; Þuríður Blær Jóhannsdóttir
- Past members: Anna Tara Andrésdóttir; Ásthildur Úa Sigurðardóttir; Bergþóra Einarsdóttir; Jóhanna Rakel; Guðbjörg Ríkey; Kolfinna Nikulásdóttir; Ragnarök; Salka Sól Eyfeld; Sigurlaug Sara Gunnarsdóttir; Solveig Pálsdóttir; Tinna Sverrisdóttir; Valdís Steinarsdóttir; Vigdís Ósk Howser

Daughters of Reykjavík (Icelandic: Reykjavíkurdætur) is an all-female Icelandic hip-hop band from Reykjavík formed in 2013.

== History ==
Reykjavíkurdætur was created in 2013 by Blær Jóhannsdóttir and Kolfinna Nikulásdóttir. After connecting with other women who were interested in rapping, they began hosting recurring public female rap nights in Reykjavík. From there the band started to form as an open clan but has since developed into what it is today: A nine-piece band, with eight performers on stage at a time. Five of the current members have been in the band since it was formed in 2013. In 2017 the Daughters were asked to put up a show at the Reykjavík City Theatre. It could be anything they wanted. With the diverse background of the girls they came up with "RVKDTR THE SHOW" a performance where they expressed their experience of being a 20-something woman in Iceland. It debuted in May 2017 and got good reviews.

In October 2019, the band rebranded themselves as "Daughters of Reykjavík", the English translation of Reykjavíkurdætur.

The band launched a crowdfunding campaign in late 2013 in order to record and launch their first album, RVK DTR.

In 2019 the Daughters won the MME awards (EBBA awards) at the Eurosonic festival along with Rosalia and Bishop Briggs. The band is represented by ATC live and ATC management.

Daughters of Reykjavík released their album, Soft Spot, in April 2020. In 2022, the group was announced as one of the participants in Söngvakeppnin 2022, the Icelandic national final for the Eurovision Song Contest 2022, they placed 2nd with 69,227 votes.

== Style ==
The lyrics of Daughters of Reykjavík refer to different themes of life in Iceland, especially pertaining to Icelandic women. During an interview in 2016, the group spoke about the contribution that their songs can have in politics, partying, body shaming, gender inequality, the empowerment of women, and overcoming broken hearts. They recorded most of their songs in Icelandic but also recorded some songs in English. In 2022, they added that their goal as a band is to empower women and non-binary people through their music.

They wrote the song "Drusla" ("Slut") for the 2014 Icelandic slut walk.

== Members ==
=== Current members ===
- Karítas Óðinsdóttir (DJ)
- Katrín Helga Andrésdóttir
- Ragnhildur Holm
- Salka Valsdóttir
- Steiney Skúladóttir
- Steinunn Jónsdóttir
- Þórdís Björk Þorfinnsdóttir
- Þura Stína Kristleifsdóttir
- Þuríður Blær Jóhannsdóttir

=== Past members ===
- Anna Tara Andrésdóttir (2013–2019)
- Ásthildur Úa Sigurðardóttir (2013–2017)
- Bergþóra Einarsdóttir (2013–2016)
- Jóhanna Rakel (2013–2017)
- Guðbjörg Ríkey (2014–2015)
- Kolfinna Nikulásdóttir (2013–2019)
- Ragnarök (2015)
- Salka Sól Eyfeld (2013–2014)
- Sigurlaug Sara Gunnarsdóttir (2014–2017)
- Solveig Pálsdóttir (2013–2018)
- Tinna Sverrisdóttir (2013–2016)
- Valdís Steinarsdóttir (2013–2017)
- Vigdís Ósk Howser (2014–2016)

=== Honorary members ===
- Desi Lydic

== Discography ==
=== Studio albums ===
| Title | Details |
|---|---|
| RVK DTR | Released: 1 January 2016; Formats: CD, Vinyl, Digital download, Streaming; Label: Independent |
| Soft Spot | Released: 29 May 2020; Formats: CD, Vinyl, Digital download, Streaming; Label: Shrimp Records |

=== Extended plays ===
| Title | Details |
|---|---|
| Reykjavíkurdætur | Released: 10 July 2015; Formats: CD, Digital download, Streaming; Label: Independent |
| Shrimpcocktail | Released: 30 November 2018; Formats: CD, Digital download, Streaming; Label: Independent |

=== Singles ===
| Year | Title | Peak chart positions | Album |
| Year | Title | ICE | Album |
|---|---|---|---|
| 2015 | "Ógeðsleg" | — | Reykjavíkurdætur and RVK DTR |
| 2016 | "Hæpið" | — | RVK DTR |
| 2017 | "Kalla mig hvað" | — | Shrimpcocktail |
| 2017 | "Reppa heiminn" | — | Shrimpcocktail |
| 2017 | "Pussy Pics" | — | Shrimpcocktail |
| 2017 | "Ef mig langar það" | — | Shrimpcocktail |
| 2017 | "Hvað er málið" | — | Shrimpcocktail |
| 2018 | "Bossy" (featuring Balcony Boyz) | — | Shrimpcocktail |
| 2018 | "Ekkert drama" (featuring Svala Björgvins) | — | Shrimpcocktail |
| 2019 | "Sweets" | — | Soft Spot |
| 2020 | "Fool's Gold" | — | Soft Spot |
| 2020 | "Thirsty Hoes" | — | Soft Spot |
| 2021 | "Hot Milf Summer" | — | Non-album single |
| 2022 | "Tökum af stad" | 4 | Söngvakeppnin 2022 |
| 2022 | "Turn This Around" | 7 | Söngvakeppnin 2022 |
| 2022 | "All Out Of Luck" | — | TBA |
