= Scared of Heights =

2024 song by Hera Björk

Single by Hera Björk
- Released: 28 January 2024
- Length: 3:03
- Label: Alda
- Songwriter(s): Ferras Alqaisi; Ásdís María Viðarsdóttir; Jaro Omar; Michael Burek
- Producer(s): Michael Burek

Hera Björk singles chronology
"Frelsisvor" (2018)	"Scared of Heights" (2024)

Eurovision Song Contest 2024 entry
- Country: Iceland
- Artist(s): Hera Björk
- Language: English
- Composer(s): Ásdís María Viðarsdóttir; Ferras Alqaisi; Jaro Omar; Michael Burek
- Lyricist(s): Ásdís María Viðarsdóttir; Ferras Alqaisi; Jaro Omar; Michael Burek

Finals performance
- Semi-final result: 15th
- Semi-final points: 3

Entry chronology
- ◄ "Power" (2023)
- "Róa" (2025) ►

Official performance video
- "Scared of Heights" (First Semi-Final) on YouTube

"Scared of Heights" (Icelandic: Við förum hærra [ˈvɪːð ˈfœːrʏm ˈhairːa]; transl. "We Go Higher") is a song by Icelandic singer Hera Björk, written by Ferras Alqaisi, Ásdís María Viðarsdóttir, Jaro Omar and Michael Burek. It was released on 28 January 2024 by Alda Music. The song represented Iceland in the Eurovision Song Contest 2024.

== Background and composition ==
"Scared of Heights" was written by Ferras Alqaisi, Ásdís María Viðarsdóttir, Jaro Omar, and Michael Burek. In an analysis of the song by ESCPlus' Iván Trejo, it is described as a ballad that is "about overcoming fear and finding strength in the face of adversity". It was announced to compete in Söngvakeppnin 2024, Ríkisútvarpið (RÚV)'s national selection to select Iceland's entrant for the Eurovision Song Contest 2024 on 27 January, and was officially released a day later.

== Eurovision Song Contest ==
=== Söngvakeppnin 2024 ===
Iceland's broadcaster for the Eurovision Song Contest 2024, Ríkisútvarpið (RÚV), organized a 10-entry competition, Söngvakeppnin 2024, to select Iceland's entrant for the Eurovision Song Contest 2024. The competition was split into two semi-finals consisting of five songs, occurring on 17 and 24 February 2024, with two songs in each semi-final determined by televoting and a fifth wildcard spot chosen by RÚV advanced to the grand final. In the grand final on 2 March, two entries determined by a combination of televoting and juries were selected to advance to the superfinal; the system was also used in the superfinal to determine the winner of the contest.

"Scared of Heights" was officially announced to compete in the competition on 27 January 2024, on RÚV program Lögin i Söngvakeppninni. It was placed into the second semi-final, and was drawn to perform fifth. It managed to qualify to the final in one of the four televoting spots. In the grand final, the song qualified to the final in second place, along with Bashar Murad's "Wild West". In the grand final, despite a deficit of over 15,000 votes in the first round, Björk was able to overcome the deficit by gaining almost 20,000 more votes than Murad in the second round, winning over Murad by 3,340 votes, drawing an overall tally of 100,835 votes. Although the contest wasn't directly tied to select the Icelandic representative for Eurovision, on 11 March, Björk accepted to represent the country.

==== Voting dispute controversy ====
Immediately after the contest, multiple claims of voting glitches and appeals were made by various groups. Icelandic viewers reported on social media that the app used for viewers in the televote, RÚV Stjörnur, glitched during the superfinal. The claim was later repelled by Vodafone Iceland's director of marketing and communications, Lilja Kristín Birgisdóttir. On 3 March, one of the songwriters of "Wild West", Einar Hrafn Stefánsson, appealed for a third-party investigation of the alleged voting glitches. The request was granted after Ásdís María Viðarsdóttir, one of the writers for "Scared of Heights", stated her intent to "cut ties with the song" due to the alleged glitches on 9 March.

On 10 March, Icelandic news site Mannlíf reported that Yogev Segal, an employee of the EBU-affiliated Israeli Public Broadcasting Corporation (IPBC/Kan), allegedly started a campaign to stop Murad from winning the competition by creating a Facebook group that urged its members to vote against Murad in the final.

=== At Eurovision ===
The Eurovision Song Contest 2024 took place at the Malmö Arena in Malmö, Sweden, and consisted of two semi-finals held on the respective dates of 7 and 9 May and the final on 11 May 2024. During the allocation draw on 30 January 2024, Iceland was drawn to compete in the first semi-final, performing in the second half of the show. The country failed to qualify for the final obtaining only 3 points.

== Charts ==
Chart performance for "Scared of Heights"
Chart (2024)	Peak position
Iceland (Tónlistinn)	22

== Release history ==
Release history and format for "Scared of Heights"
Country	Date	Format(s)	Label	Ref.
Various	28 January 2024	Digital download; streaming	Alda Music	
