= Bashar Murad =

Palestinian musician

Bashar Murad بشار مراد
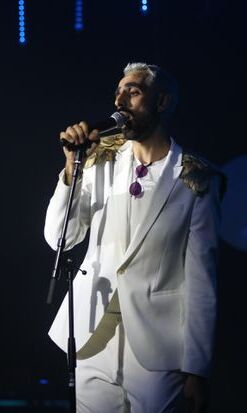
- Murad in 2019

Background information
- Born: 7 February 1993 (age 33); East Jerusalem
- Genres: Pop
- Occupations: Singer; songwriter; social activist
- Instruments: Vocals; piano
- Years active: 2015–present
- Website: www.basharmurad.com

Bashar Murad (Arabic: بشار مراد; born 7 February 1993) is a Palestinian singer based in East Jerusalem. His music addresses societal norms and issues of gender equality in the Middle East. He is best known for his collaboration with Icelandic techno-punk band Hatari on the song "Klefi / Samed", which was released shortly after Hatari raised banners featuring the Palestinian flag at the final of Eurovision Song Contest 2019 in Tel Aviv. Murad released his debut EP Maskhara in June 2021.

== Early life ==
Murad was born in East Jerusalem in 1993, to parents Said Murad and Fadia Daibes. Murad's father, Said, is the founder of the Palestinian musical group Sabreen, the first Palestinian group of its kind. Sabreen was founded in 1980, and Murad was born during the height of their career. Music helped Murad to overcome the pressure from growing up in an occupied territory.

Upon graduating from the Jerusalem American School, Murad pursued a bachelor's degree at Bridgewater College, Virginia, United States. In the United States, he realized that not a lot of his co-students knew much about Palestine, yet they wanted to know more about it. This made him realise that he did not want to escape politics and started covering these issues in his music. Since returning to East Jerusalem in 2014 and after publishing several singles in Arabic and English on his YouTube channel, Murad has built an online following.

== Career ==
Murad started his career by uploading cover versions of popular songs on his YouTube channel which he created in 2009. Later, he added a Middle Eastern touch to the songs by using traditional instruments in his covers before he started creating his own songs. He studied at Rimon School of Jazz and Contemporary Music in Israel for a year, and was the first Palestinian from the West Bank to study there.

The majority of his songs are produced by himself in the local record studios of Sabreen Association for Artistic Development. Occasionally, Murad gets grants or other support by organisations and programs, such as the Culture Resource Production Awards Program, that enabled him to produce the song "Shillet Hamal (Bunch of Bums)". The song is about the feeling of being different and not fitting in. The music video features several people that chose alternative paths of life and can thus identify with this feeling.

For his single "Ana Zalameh (I'm a Man)", Murad worked together with the United Nations. The UN Women's "Men and Women for Gender Equality Regional Programme" produced the song which is about the developments of gender roles in Palestine and told from the perspective of a 10-year-old boy.

Murad's collaboration with the Icelandic techno-punk band Hatari on the song "Klefi / Samed" helped him reach a wider audience. The song was released shortly after the Eurovision Song Contest 2019, which took place in Tel Aviv, and is about the wish for freedom and calls attention to the systematic oppression of Palestinians. Hatari was the only entrant in that year's contest who openly took a stance on the conflict.

During the Eurovision Song Contest 2019, Murad was part of the protesting artists that participated in the alternative event GlobalVision that was broadcast online during Eurovision week.

In May 2019, Murad participated in the Canadian Music Week in Toronto, Canada.

Murad released his debut EP Maskhara on 11 June 2021, which included four tracks: "Maskhara", "Antenne" feat. Tamer Nafar, "Intifada on the Dance Floor", and "Ana wnafsi". Three years later, he released his second Arabic-language EP, Nafas.

In 24 January 2024, it was announced that he would be among the contestants of Söngvakeppnin 2024, the Icelandic national selection for the Eurovision Song Contest 2024. He competed with the song "Vestrið villt" / "Wild West", qualifying for the final and ultimately coming second. Amid the Gaza war and calls for Israel to be excluded from the contest, Murad's participation was the subject of multiple controversies, both with accusations that Icelandic broadcaster RÚV was politicising the event as well as allegations that he was the victim of racism. Murad later performed at the "Falastinvision" event, which was organised in Malmö, the host city of Eurovision 2024, as an alternative to the Eurovision final on 11 May in protest against Israel's participation.

== Personal life ==
Murad currently resides in Paris. He is openly gay, and has characterized his artistic journey as a struggle against both homophobia in Palestinian society and the Israeli occupation.

== Discography ==
=== Extended plays ===
- Maskhara (2021)
- Maskhara: The Remixes (2022)
- Nafas (2024)

=== Singles ===
==== As lead artist ====
- "Hallelujah", 2015
- "Happy Xmas (War Is Over)" ft. Muhammad Mughrabi, 2015
- "The Door", 2015
- "More Like You", November 2016
- "Voices", April 2017
- "Ilkul 3am bitjawaz" (Everyone's Getting Married), January 2018
- "Shillet hamal" (Bunch of Bums), July 2018
- "Ma bitghayirni" (You Can't Change Me), September 2018
- "Ana zalameh" (I'm a Man), November 2018
- "Maskhara" (Mockery), December 2020
- "Antenne" ft. Tamer Nafar, June 2021
- "Intifada on the Dance Floor", November 2021
- "Xmas Aswad", December 2022
- "Ilel majnoon", March 2023
- "Ya Lel", June 2023
- "Mawtini", November 2023
- "Nafas", January 2024
- "Vestrið villt" / "Wild West", February 2024

==== As featured artist ====
- "Klefi / Samed" by Hatari, June 2019
