= Bragi Bergsson =

Swedish-Icelandic footballer and singer (born 1993)

- Born: Arnar Bragi Bergsson; 30 April 1993 (age 33); Reykjavík, Iceland
- Occupations: Footballer; singer
- Height: 1.84 m (6 ft 0 in)
- Musical career
- Genre: Pop music
- Years active: 2018–present
Association football career
- Position: Midfielder
Team information
- Current team: Västra Frölunda
- Number: 8
Youth career
- –2010: Västra Frölunda
- 2010–2012: IFK Göteborg
Senior career*
Years	Team	Apps	(Gls)
2012	IFK Göteborg	0	(0)
2013–2014	ÍBV	29	(2)
2015–2016	GAIS	24	(3)
2016	Fylkir	7	(1)
2017	IK Oddevold	24	(5)
2018–2021	Utsikten	71	(8)
2022	Västra Frölunda		
International career
2009	Iceland U17	4	(1)
2010–2011	Iceland U19	7	(0)
- * Club domestic league appearances and goals as of 15 April 2022

Arnar Bragi Bergsson (born 30 April 1993) is an Icelandic footballer and singer. In 2018, Bragi came third in the fourteenth season of the singing competition Swedish Idol. In 2023, he finished in the top five in the Söngvakeppnin. He holds both Icelandic and Swedish citizenship.

== Early life ==
Bragi was born in Reykjavík, Iceland, to Icelandic parents. The family moved to Sweden when he was around two years old when his father, who is a doctor, went to further his education. He took to using his middle name due to Swedish people having trouble pronouncing his first name. He holds both Icelandic and Swedish citizenship.

== Football ==
=== Club career ===
In 2013, Bragi moved back to Iceland and played for ÍBV in the top-tier Úrvalsdeild karla. In 2015, he moved back to Sweden and signed with GAIS. He returned to Iceland in 2016 and played for Fylkir. In December 2017, Bragi signed a two-year contract with Utsiktens BK.

On 11 February 2022, Bragi joined Västra Frölunda.

In March 2023, Bragi was attending training camp with Fylkir.

=== International career ===
Bragi played 11 matches for the Iceland U17 and U19 teams from 2009 and 2011.

== Singing career ==
In 2018, Bragi participated in Idol 2018 which is broadcast on TV4, and he reached the Top 20 first. He ended up placing in shared third place along with William Segerdahl in the 30 November semifinal.

On 28 January 2023, it was announced that Bragi would be competing in Söngvakeppnin 2023, the national selection to select the Icelandic entry for the Eurovision Song Contest 2023. On 4 March, he finished in the top five in the competition.
