= Sigga Ózk =

Icelandic singer and beauty pageant titleholder (born 1999

- Sigga in 2024
- Born: Sigríður Ósk Hrafnkelsdóttir; 15 April 1999 (age 27); Garðabær, Iceland
- Education: University of Iceland (B.Ed.)
- Beauty pageant titleholder
- Title: Miss Hafravatn 2026; Miss Iceland 2026
- Major competitions: Miss Iceland 2026; (Winner); Miss Universe 2026; (TBD)

Sigríður Ósk Hrafnkelsdóttir (born 15 April 1999), also known as Sigga Ózk, is an Icelandic singer and beauty pageant titleholder who won Miss Iceland 2026. She will represent Iceland at Miss Universe 2026.

== Early life and career ==
Sigga was born on 15 April 1999 to Hrafnkell Pálmarsson and Elín Mária Björnsdóttir, and was raised in Garðabær.

She holds a Bachelor of Education (B.Ed.) degree from University of Iceland, as well as a diploma in composition from the Lillehammer Institute for Music Production and Industries.

She competed in Söngvakeppnin, Iceland's national selection for the Eurovision Song Contest, in 2023 and 2024, reaching the final on both occasions. Her song "Gleyma þér og dansa" was released by RÚV. In 2024 she competed with a song she wrote herself called "Into the atmosphere" where the Icelandic version "Um allan alheiminn" went viral for sounding like "Go Tiffany". After this performance she was claimed to be "The Icelandic Ariana Grande".

== Pageantry ==
Sigga represented Hafravatn and won Miss Iceland 2026 (Icelandic: Ungfrú Ísland 2026), on 22 April 2026 at Gamla Bíó in Reykjavík. She will represent Iceland at Miss Universe 2026, which is scheduled to take place in November 2026 in San Juan, Puerto Rico.

Awards and achievements
Preceded by Guðrún Eva Hauksdóttir	Miss Iceland; 2026	Incumbent
