= Power (Diljá song) =

2023 song by Diljá

Single by Diljá
- Released: 4 March 2023
- Length: 3:03
- Label: Rok
- Songwriters: Diljá Pétursdóttir; Pálmi Ragnar Ásgeirsson
- Producer: Pálmi Ragnar Ásgeirsson

Diljá singles chronology
"Lifandi inni í mér" (2023)	"Power" (2023)	"Crazy" (2023)

Eurovision Song Contest 2023 entry
- Country: Iceland
- Artist: Diljá
- Language: English
- Composers: Diljá Pétursdóttir; Pálmi Ragnar Ásgeirsson
- Lyricists: Diljá Pétursdóttir; Pálmi Ragnar Ásgeirsson

Finals performance
- Semi-final result: 11th
- Semi-final points: 44

Entry chronology
- ◄ "Með hækkandi sól" (2022)
- "Scared of Heights" (2024) ►

"Power" is a 2023 song by Icelandic singer-songwriter Diljá Pétursdóttir. The song represented Iceland in the Eurovision Song Contest 2023 after winning Söngvakeppnin 2023, the Icelandic national final for that year's Eurovision Song Contest. The song peaked at number one in Iceland.

== Release ==
The song was released on 28 January 2023, along with all other songs competing in Söngvakeppnin 2023.

== Eurovision Song Contest ==
=== Söngvakeppnin 2023 ===
Between 29 August and 4 October 2022, RÚV opened the period for interested songwriters to submit their entries. Songwriters did not have any particular requirement to meet, and the process was open to all. The broadcaster received 132 submissions at the closing of the deadline. The ten competing entries were revealed on 28 January 2023.

"Power" took place in the first semi-final out of two semi finals, the first one taking place on 18 February 2023. She performed the Icelandic version of the song called "Lifandi inni mér", as per contest rules that in the semi-finals, all competing entries were required to be performed in Icelandic. In each semi-final, five of the ten competing acts performed, and the two entries which were determined solely by the viewing public through telephone voting and the newly introduced RÚV Stjörnur app progressed to the final. As per the rules of the competition, an additional optional qualifier could be selected by the contest organisers from among the non-qualifying acts, which would also progress to the final. This option was subsequently invoked by the organisers, meaning that a total of five acts qualified for the final.

The final was held on 4 March 2023. In the first round featuring the five finalists, "Power" qualified as one of two finalists to move on to the final duel to become the winner of the contest. In the final round, "Power" emerged as the winner of Söngvakeppnin 2023, becoming Iceland's representative for the Eurovision Song Contest 2023.

=== At Eurovision ===
According to Eurovision rules, all nations with the exceptions of the host country and the "Big Five" (France, Germany, Italy, Spain and the United Kingdom) are required to qualify from one of two semi-finals in order to compete for the final; the top ten countries from each semi-final progress to the final. The European Broadcasting Union (EBU) split up the competing countries into six different pots based on voting patterns from previous contests, with countries with favourable voting histories put into the same pot. On 31 January 2023, an allocation draw was held, which placed each country into one of the two semi-finals, and determined which half of the show they would perform in. Iceland was placed into the second semi-final, held on 11 May 2023, and was scheduled to perform in the first half of the final. Iceland failed to qualify for the final.

== Charts ==
Chart performance for "Power"
Chart (2023)	Peak position
Iceland (Tónlistinn)	1
Lithuania (AGATA)	78
