= Gísli Marteinn Baldursson =

Icelandic TV host and politician (born 1972)

- Born: 26 February 1972 (age 54); Reykjavík, Iceland
- Education: University of Iceland; University of Edinburgh
- Occupation: Television host
- Employer: RÚV
- Known for: Laugardagskvöld með Gísla Marteini; Vikan með Gísla Marteini

Gísli Marteinn Baldursson (born 26 February 1972) is an Icelandic television host and a former politician. He is known for hosting the talk shows Laugardagskvöld með Gísla Marteini and Vikan með Gísla Marteini as well as the Icelandic broadcasts of the Eurovision Song Contest.

== Early life ==
Gísli grew up in Hólar in Breiðholt where he lived until his twenties when he moved to Vesturbær.

== Television career ==
Gísli Marteinn started working at RÚV in 1997, first as a journalist and later as a programmer. He was the initiator of the show Kastljós in 2000. In 2002, he started hosting the talk show Laugardagskvöld með Gísla Marteini. In 2003, he won the Edda Award for Best Television Personality. In 2013 he hosted the show Sunnudagsmorgun.

He provided commentary for the Icelandic broadcasts of the Eurovision Song Contest from 1999 to 2005 and again from 2016 to 2023. He declined to provide commentary in 2024 due to Israel's participation amidst the Gaza war and the "lack of reaction" from contest organisers.

== Political career ==
Gísli Marteinn was a city representative for the Independence Party in the Reykjavík City Council from 2005 to 2013. He was previously a deputy representative from 2003 to 2005. He left politics in 2013 and returned to television.

== In popular culture ==
Gísli is referenced briefly in the lyrics of "Róa", a song by the electronic duo Væb, which represented Iceland in the 2025 Eurovision Song Contest. Væb's Eurovision follow-up album Væbout includes a 47-second track titled "Gísli Marteinn".
