= Ragga Holm =

Icelandic singer, radio host, and DJ

- Born: Ragnhildur Jónasdóttir; 21 October 1987 (age 38); Höfn í Hornafirði, Iceland
- Education: University of Iceland
- Occupations: Rapper, radio-host, DJ
- Years active: 2011–present
- Known for: Reykjavíkurdætur

Ragnhildur Jónasdóttir, also known as Ragga Holm, is an Icelandic rapper, radio host and DJ. She is a member of the band Reykjavíkurdætur.

== Early life ==
Ragnhildur was born in Höfn í Hornafirði, Iceland, but grew up in Reykjavík, Hafnarfjörður and Keflavík.

== Music career ==
In 2011, she released her first single, Það er komið sumar.

== Discography ==
- BIPOLAR (2018)
