= Með hækkandi sól =

2022 song by Systur

Song by Systur
- Language: Icelandic
- Released: 5 February 2022
- Genre: Folk pop, country
- Length: 3:00
- Songwriter: Lovísa Elísabet Sigrúnardóttir

Music video
- "Með hækkandi sól" on YouTube

Eurovision Song Contest 2022 entry
- Country: Iceland
- Artist: Systur
- Composer: Lovísa Elísabet Sigrúnardóttir
- Lyricist: Lovísa Elísabet Sigrúnardóttir

Finals performance
- Semi-final result: 10th
- Semi-final points: 103
- Final result: 23rd
- Final points: 20

Entry chronology
- ◄ "10 Years" (2021)
- "Power" (2023) ►

"Með hækkandi sól" (Icelandic: [mɛð ˈhaihkantɪ ˈsouːl]; transl. "With the rising sun") is a 2022 song by Icelandic folk group Systur. The song represented Iceland in the Eurovision Song Contest 2022 in Turin, Italy after winning Söngvakeppnin 2022, the Icelandic national final. The song peaked at number-one in Iceland.

== Release ==
The song was released on 5 February 2022, along with all other songs competing in Söngvakeppnin 2022.

== Eurovision Song Contest ==
=== Söngvakeppnin 2022 ===
Between 3 September and 6 October 2021, RÚV opened the period for interested songwriters to submit their entries. Songwriters did not have any particular requirement to meet, and the process was open to all. At the close of submissions, 158 songs had been entered. A selection committee formed under consultation with the Association of Composers (FTT) and the Icelandic Musicians' Union (FÍH) selected the ten competing entries, all of which were revealed on 5 February 2022.

"Með hækkandi sól" took place in the first semi-final out of two semi finals, the first one taking place on 26 February 2022. In each semi-final, five of the ten competing acts performed, and two entries determined solely by the viewing public through telephone voting progressed to the final. As per the rules of the competition, an additional optional qualifier could be selected by the contest organisers from among the non-qualifying acts, which would also progress to the final. This option was subsequently invoked by the organisers, meaning that a total of five acts qualified for the final. "Með hækkandi sól" qualified as one of the two finalists.

The final was held on 12 March 2022. In the first round featuring the five finalists, "Með hækkandi sól" qualified as one of two finalists to move on to the final duel to become the winner of the contest. In the final round, "Með hækkandi sól" emerged as the winner of Söngvakeppnin 2022, becoming Iceland's representative for the Eurovision Song Contest 2022.

=== At Eurovision ===
According to Eurovision rules, all nations with the exceptions of the host country and the "Big Five" (France, Germany, Italy, Spain and the United Kingdom) are required to qualify from one of two semi-finals in order to compete for the final; the top ten countries from each semi-final progress to the final. The European Broadcasting Union (EBU) split up the competing countries into six different pots based on voting patterns from previous contests, with countries with favourable voting histories put into the same pot. On 25 January 2022, an allocation draw was held which placed each country into one of the two semi-finals, as well as which half of the show they would perform in. Iceland was placed into the first semi-final, which was held on 10 May 2022, and performed in the second half of the show.

The song qualified for the grand final and was performed in the second half.

== Charts ==
=== Weekly charts ===
Weekly chart performance for "Með hækkandi sól"
Chart (2022)	Peak position
Iceland (Tónlistinn)	1
Lithuania (AGATA)	38

=== Year-end charts ===
Year-end chart performance for "Með hækkandi sól"
Chart (2022)	Position
Iceland (Tónlistinn)	17
