= Langi Seli og Skuggarnir =

Icelandic rock band

- Origin: Reykjavík, Iceland
- Genres: Rockabilly; surf music
- Years active: 1988–present
- Labels: Mix Records ehf.
- Members: Langi Seli; Jón Skuggi; Erik Quick
- Past members: Kormákur Geirharðsson; Steingrímur Guðmundsson; Gísli Galdur

Langi Seli og Skuggarnir is an Icelandic rock band formed in 1988. It plays exclusively from its catalogue of original music, which can be characterised as rockabilly with a particularly modern approach.

Langi Seli og Skuggarnir's musical style is influenced by early rockabilly and surf music. It has been described as "modern and vintage all at the same time".

Their lyrics cover life in its disparate forms, sometimes banal, other times fantastic.

Formed in 1988, Langi Seli og Skuggarnir released the single "Breiðholtsbúgí" in 1989; it became a hit song in Iceland and has been released on two 80s compilations.

The band's first studio album, Rottur og kettir, was released in 1990.

In 2009 the band came out of a 17-year hiatus, published a new studio album, Drullukalt and resumed playing live music in Iceland.

The current lineup consists of Langi Seli (vocals and guitar), Jón Skuggi (double bass and vocals) and Erik Qvick (drums and vocals).

Former members are Kormákur Geirharðsson (drums) Steingrímur Guðmundsson (guitar) and Gísli Galdur (soundscapes and vocals).

== Discography ==
=== Albums ===
- 1990: Rottur og kettir (LP and CD, singles included on CD)
- 2009: Drullukalt (CD)

=== Singles ===
- 1988: Kontinentalinn (vinyl)
- 1989: Breiðholtsbúgí (vinyl)
- 2019: Bensínið er búið (vinyl)

=== Compilations ===
- 1994: Já takk – Contributed "Úti að keyra" and "Græna gatan".
- 1995: Cold fever Icelandic/Japanese film "Undir Súð" Instrumental mix
- 2000: Með allt á hreinu – Óður til kvikmyndar – contributed "Íslenskir karlmenn".
- 2002: Alltaf sama svínið – contributed "Breiðholtsbúgí"
- 2007: 100 íslensk 80s lög 5 – contributed "Breiðholtsbúgí"
