= Ingólfur Þórarinsson =

Icelandic singer and former footballer

Ingó Veðurguð
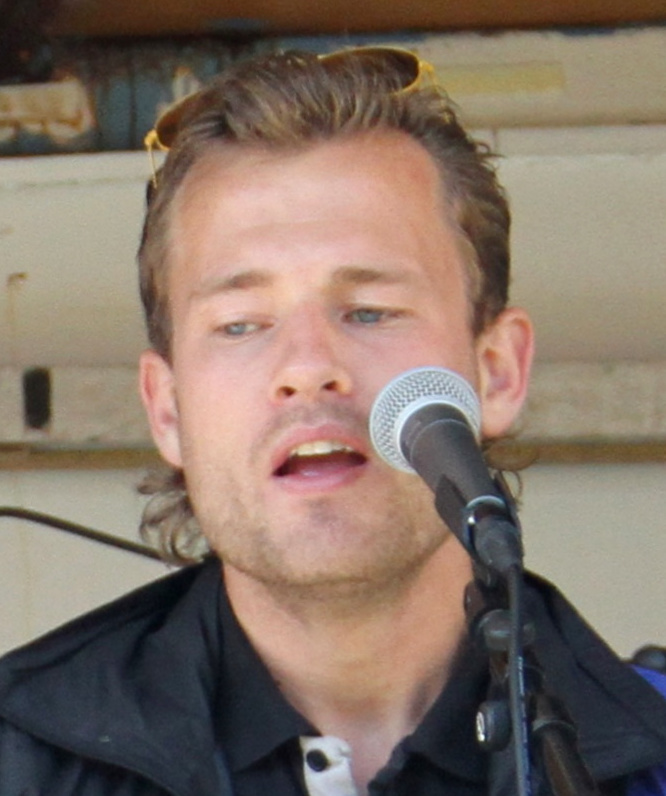

Background information
- Born: Ingólfur Þórarinsson; 31 May 1986 (age 40); Selfoss, Iceland
Association football career
- Height: 1.80 m (5 ft 11 in)
- Position: Midfielder
Youth career
- –2003: Selfoss
- 2003–2004: Örgryte IS
- 2004–2005: Selfoss
- 2005: Fram
Senior career*
Years	Team	Apps	(Gls)
2003	Selfoss	10	(0)
2004–2005	Selfoss	18	(1)
2005–2007	Fram	8	(0)
2007–2011	Selfoss	70	(7)
2011	Víkingur	1	(0)
2011–2013	Selfoss	34	(5)
2013–2014	Hamar	16	(1)
2015–2016	KFS	10	(0)
2016	Ægir	4	(1)
International career^{‡}
2001–2002	Iceland U16	4	(0)
2002	Iceland U17	2	(0)
2004	Iceland U19	3	(0)
Managerial career
- 2013–2014: Hamar (player-manager)
- * Club domestic league appearances and goals as of 1 April 2020 ‡ National team caps and goals as of 1 April 2020

Ingólfur Þórarinsson (born 31 May 1986), commonly known as Ingó Veðurguð (Ingó the Weather God), is an Icelandic singer and songwriter and a former footballer. He plays with the band Ingó og Veðurguðirnir, best known for the 2008 hit song "Bahama" and the 2009 song "Gestalistinn".

== Football career ==
=== Club career ===
Ingólfur started his career with local club Selfoss before signing with Örgryte IS in September 2003. Things didn't work out in Sweden and he came back to Selfoss in March 2004.

In February 2005 Ingólfur signed with Fram after attracting interest from clubs like Fylkir, ÍBV and Valur. Ingólfur only played 8 games for Fram and signed again for Selfoss in January 2007. Ingólfur was part of the Selfoss team who gained promotion to the top-tier Úrvalsdeild karla for the first time in the club's history in 2009.

In January 2011 Ingólfur signed for Víkingur but only managed to play 2 games there before signing once again with Selfoss in August later that year.

In October 2013 Ingólfur was appointed as a player-manager at Hamar for the 2014 season who then played in 3. deild karla after getting relegated from 2. deild karla in 2013. Hamar only managed to win 2 games and got relegated to 4. deild karla.

=== International career ===
Ingólfur played 4 games for Iceland U16, 2 games for Iceland U17 and 3 games for Iceland U19.

=== Honours ===
- 2. deild karla
  - Runner-up (1): 2007
- 1. deild karla
  - Winners (1): 2009
  - Runner-up (1): 2011
- Nordic Under-17 Football Championship
  - Runner-up (1): 2002

== Musical career ==
=== Idol ===
Ingólfur competed in the third season of the Icelandic Idol in 2005 finishing in 6th place. At that time he played for Fram and that was part of the reason he only managed to play 8 games for Fram.

=== Ingó og Veðurguðirnir ===
In 2008 Ingólfur made up a musical formation called Ingó og Veðurguðirnir. Ingó og Veðurguðirnir are best known for their hit "Bahama". The song stayed at the top of Tónlist, the official Icelandic Singles Chart for 9 consecutive weeks in 2008. Another hit for Ingó og Veðurguðirnir called "Gestalistinn" stayed for 9 weeks at the top of Tónlist charts.

=== Solo career ===
Ingólfur took part in Söngvakeppni sjónvarpsins in 2009, the 2009 Icelandic selection for Eurovision Song Contest with "Undir regnbogann". He reached the finals but finished second behind "Is It True?" by Jóhanna Guðrún Jónsdóttir. In 2011 Ingólfur released his first solo album called "Ingó" which includes the Ingó og Veðurguðirnir hit "Argentín" as a bonus track. Since then Ingólfur has released couple if hits including "Suðurlandsins eina von", "Sumargleðin", "Valli Reynis", "Gestalistin 2.0", "Kenya" and "Í kvöld er gigg".

== Personal life ==
Ingólfur's brother is the Icelandic footballer Guðmundur Þórarinsson who played for New York City in the MLS.

== Controversy ==
From 2013, Ingólfur had been leading the brekkusöngur sing-along at Þjóðhátíð in Vestmannaeyjar and was slated to return in 2021. After a wave of allegations of sexual harassment and assault, backed up by a long line of stories of inappropriate behavior, particularly towards underage girls, the organising committee cancelled his appearance.
