= Ingó og Veðurguðirnir =

Icelandic musical formation

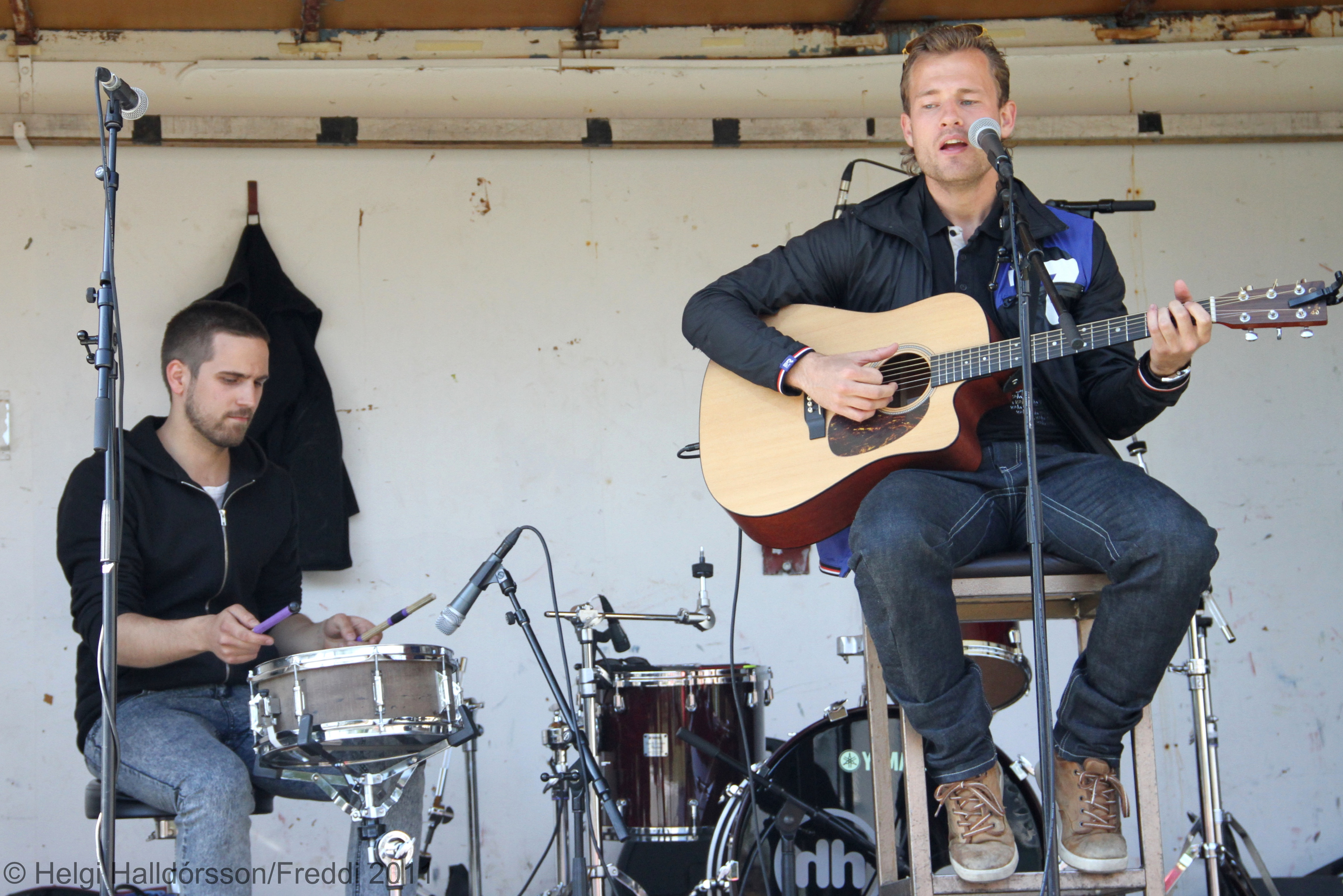
Ingó og Veðurguðirnir (2011)

Ingó og Veðurguðirnir (in English Ingó and the Weathergods) is an Icelandic musical formation made up of Ingó (full name Ingólfur Þórarinsson) as main vocalist and acoustic guitar player with Maggi (guitar), Eyþór (bass) and Óskar (drums).

Ingó og Veðurguðirnir are best known for their summer hit "Bahama". The song stayed at the top of Tónlist, the official Icelandic Singles Chart for 9 consecutive weeks in 2008. They peaked the Iceland charts for one week in 2009 with "Nóttin er liðin". Another hit for Ingó og Veðurguðirnir called "Gestalistinn" stayed for 9 weeks at the top of Tónlist charts (2009 weeks 39 to 46 and week 48). Other releases by the formation include "Argentína".

== Ingó (solo) ==
Ingólfur Þórarinsson better known by his mononym Ingó has had also releases of his own, notably taking part in Söngvakeppni Sjónvarpsins in 2009, the 2009 Icelandic selection for Eurovision Song Contest with "Undir regnbogann" (meaning Under the rainbow), which was composed by Hallgrímur Óskarsson and written by Eiríkur Hauksson. He reached the finals finished as second just behind "Is It True?" by Jóhanna Guðrún Jónsdóttir with 10,696 for Ingó behind Jóhanna's 19,076. He came back the following year to present some parts of the 2010 selections.

He went on to releases like "Ég er sko vinur þinn" credited to Ingó og Jóhanna Guðrún and "Vinurinn" credited to Ingó, Jóhanna Guðrún og Jógvan.

== Discography ==
=== Albums ===
Album and details	Peak positions	Track listing
Album and details	ISL	Track listing
Góðar stundir: Date released: 2009		1. "Bara brosa" (3:16); 2. "Bahama" (3:39); 3. "Nóttin er liðin" (3:02); 4. "Manstu" (3:15); 5. "Þessi hljómsveit" (3:42); 6. "Vinurinn" (3:09); 7. "Börnin" (3:52); 8. "Vá hvað ég fíla'na" (3:28); 9. "Drífa" (3:12); 10. "Nýraunsæi" (3:13); 11. "Gestalistinn" (2:42); 12. "Undir regnbogann" (2:59)

=== Singles ===
==== Ingó og Veðurguðirnir ====
Year	Single	Peak positions	Album
Year	Single	ISL	Album
2008	"Drifa"	8	Góðar stundir
2008	"Bahama"	1	Góðar stundir
2009	"Vinurinn"	3	Góðar stundir
2009	"Nóttin er liðin"	1	Góðar stundir
2009	"Gestalistinn"	1	Góðar stundir
2010	"Ef ég ætti konu"		
2010	"Argentína"		
2013	"Önnur Öld"	17	Önnur Öld
2013	"Ferðalag"	29	
2014	"Ítalska lagið"	25	

==== Other appearances ====
- 2009: "Undir regnbogann" (Ingó in Eurovision selection finals for Iceland)
- 2010: "Ég er sko vinur þinn" (Ingó og Jóhanna Guðrún on album Latabæjarhátíð í Höllinni)
- 2010: "Vinurinn" (Ingó, Jóhanna Guðrún og Jógvan on album Latabæjarhátíð í Höllinni)
