= Egill Einarsson =

- Also known as: Gillz; Gillzenegger
- Born: 13 May 1980 (age 46)
- Origin: Iceland
- Genre: Electronic
- Occupations: Radio show host; disc jockey; fitness coach
- Formerly of: Merzedes Club

Egill "Gillz" Einarsson (born 13 May 1980) is an Icelandic television personality, radio show host, fitness coach, motivational speaker, DJ and singer. As a musician, he was part of the dance act Merzedes Club in 2008 where he was known as Gillz and Gillzenegger. After the break-up he has continued as a disc jockey known as DJ MuscleBoy. His advice, his videos and his writings have received widespread criticism, including accusations of misogyny, promotion of rape, and racism.

== Career ==
=== Media personality ===
Egill first became known as a blogger on the now defunct website kallarnir.is in the mid-2000s. Later he wrote columns for the newspaper DV and the magazine Bleikt og blátt, and hosted a radio show on the Icelandic KissFM radio station. His popularity increased as the host of his own TV show Kallarnir, and the author of the lifestyle book Beautiful People's Bible.

As of 2021, Egill is one of the hosts of the radio programme FM95BLÖ.

=== Fitness and lifestyle ===
Egill operates the distant fitness training program and has been an advocate of fitness and a healthy lifestyle. He has written self-help lifestyle books, pick up artist books and hosted the TV show Mannasiðir Gillz on Stöð 2 in 2011.

In November 2011 he criticized the book Bang Iceland by American pickup artist Roosh Vörek, calling it "as wrong as possible". Egill declared that his pick-up tactics are based on being entertaining and fun around women, not on isolating them and getting them drunk.

=== Musical career ===
Egill was a member of the techno band Merzedes Club, where he was nicknamed Gillz or Gillzenegger and was the band's keyboardist and spokesperson. The band also included Rebekka, Ceres 4, Gaz-man and Party-Hanz.

Merzedes Club was put by composer and producer Barði Jóhannson in a bid to represent Iceland in the 2008 Eurovision Song Contest. The band Merzedes Club took part with the song "Ho, Ho, Ho, We say Hey, Hey, Hey" coming runner-up to eventual winner "This Is My Life" by Eurobandið. A series of singles followed in 2008 notably with "Meira frelsi" which was adopted as a signature tune for publicity campaign for Síminn, (previously named Landssíminn), an Icelandic telecommunications company. The song created controversy with some alleging great similarities in the music video to that of "Now You're Gone" from Basshunter. Other Merzedes Club hits included "I Wanna Touch You", "See Me Now" and "Basscop". The band released their album I Wanna Touch You after which it broke up.

After the break-up of the band, Egill Einarsson has continued as a solo disc jockey.

== Controversies ==
=== Sexual assault allegations ===
In December 2011 Egill, then aged 31, was accused of rape and sexual assault of an 18-year-old girl. In January 2012 a separate girl, aged 15, accused him of sexual assault. In November 2012 the investigations were dropped on the basis of a low likelihood of conviction. After an interview discussing the rape allegations was broadcast, a user on Instagram made a post with a caption calling Einarsson a rapist. Einarsson unsuccessfully sued for defamation at the district court and Supreme Court of Iceland, but the European Court of Human Rights disagreed with the Icelandic courts' rulings.

At the time of the allegations a phone directory with Egill's face on the cover had recently been given to all Icelandic residents. As a result of the allegations, the company sourcing the directories offered stickers to glue over Egill's face.

=== Racism allegations ===
Egill has been accused by academics and the public of racism. In his 2009 book Mannasiðir Gillz he wrote that was "in awe of many things in black people's culture. They don't give a shit about education and they're too lazy to work". He was also accused of racial stereotyping for saying that "in the black man's culture it is normal to call women bitches and ho's. In the black man's culture it is very important to treat your woman like trash. On the other hand, Asian men are studious and good workers, but bad at having intercourse".

In 2020 Egill was criticized by human rights activist Sema Erla Serdar after a video from his 40th birthday party emerged on social media. The video shows Egill laughing as his friend performs a slanted eye pose, gestures fellatio and pretends to be an Asian prostitute offering to "clean home" or "suck penis" in exchange for money in a thick accent.

=== Misogyny allegations ===
In 2007, Egill published an article listing well known female Icelandic politicians and journalists, all of whom were associated with feminist policies, who he said needed to be "silenced for good". Egill indicated that the best way to do this was through sexual acts from a fictional "Jamal Johnson". In the article Egill said that most feminists were disgusting and mentally ill. The women named included politicians Drífa Snædal, Kolbrún Halldórsdóttir and Steinunn Valdís Óskarsdóttir. He accused numerous women of having attained their positions in society through the fellatio of their superiors. The article caused widespread outrage in Iceland, including among the women named who published counter-articles and from within the academic community. Ten years later, in 2017, Egill apologized saying he was ashamed of the article.

== Bibliography ==
- Biblía fallega fólksins (The Beautiful People's Bible)
- Mannasiðir Gillz (2010) (Gillz's Manners)
- Lífsleikni Gillz (2011) (Gillz's Life Skills)
- Heilræði Gillz (2012) (Gillz's Quality Advices)

== Filmography ==
=== Films ===
- Svartur á leik (English title Black Game) as Sævar K (2012)
- Lífsleikni Gillz (2014)
- Leynilögga (English title Cop Secret) (2021)

=== Television shows ===
- Kallarnir
- Wipeout Ísland (Wipeout Iceland)
- Auddi og Sveppi (Auddi and Sveppi)
- Ameríski Draumurinn (The American Dream)
- Mannasiðir Gillz (Gillz's Manners)

== Discography ==
=== Albums ===
As part of Merzedes Club

- 2008: I Wanna Touch You

=== Singles ===
As part of Merzedes Club

- 2008: "Ho, Ho, Ho, We say Hey, Hey, Hey"
- 2008: "Meira Frelsi"
- 2008: "I Wanna Touch You"
- 2008: "See Me Now"
- 2008: "Basscop"

as DJ MuscleBoy

- 2014: "Louder" (as DJ MuscleBoy featuring StopWaitGo)
- 2014: "Pump"
- 2014: "Musclebells"
- 2016: "#Muscledance"
- 2018: "#VIKINGCLAP"
- 2018: "#Summerbody"
- 2019: "MuscleClub"
- 2020: “Stronger Without You”
- 2021: “Spending My Time” (featuring Yohanna)
