= Hössi Ólafsson =

Icelandic singer, rapper, producer, writer, and actor (born 1977)

- Born: Höskuldur Ólafsson; 1977 (age 48–49); Reykjavík, Iceland
- Genres: Hip hop, rap rock, alternative rock
- Occupations: Singer, rapper, producer, writer, actor
- Years active: 1996–present

Hössi Ólafsson (born Höskuldur Ólafsson; 1977) is a singer, rapper, producer, writer, and actor. He is best known as a founding member of the Icelandic rap group, Quarashi.

== Professional career ==
Hössi was born in Reykjavík, and first met future Quarashi member Sölvi Blöndal at the University of Iceland in the early 1990s. According to Blöndal, the first thing Hössi ever said to him was if he had any marijuana to sell.

Sölvi and Hössi would go on to play in the punk rock band, 2001. However, Sölvi soon began to develop a preference for studio production over band rehearsal-style songwriting. He also wanted to make different types of music besides industrial rock and punk, so he quit 2001 and began making rap music. Later on, Sölvi invited Hössi to join him in making rap music along with famous Icelandic skater and graffiti artist, Steini a.k.a. Stoney. Originally, Hössi would sing, while Steini would rap, but when Sölvi heard Hössi rap, he decided that his music group would have two rappers. Once that was settled, the three men formed Quarashi in 1996.

Hössi would serve as a vocalist in Quarashi from their first record, an EP entitled, Switchstance, in 1996, until their first international release, Jinx, in 2002. Hössi rapped the most on Quarashi songs, and also did some singing for the group, singing on "Dive In", "Into Your Arms", and "Fly to the Sky", in addition to singing the chorus of some songs.

Hössi, along with the rest of Quarashi, were featured in a 1999 documentary about the group entitled, Around The Country On Medicine. He was also seen in a 1998 documentary that talked about Icelandic music.

In 2001, Hössi and Sölvi Blöndal produced the soundtrack for the Halldór Laxness play, Kristnihald undir Jökli, which was directed by Bergur Þór Ingólfsson, and ran in the Borgarleikhús in the winter of 2001. The album was released under the Quarashi name and most of the 500 copies made were sold. Hössi has been quoted as saying that working on Kristnihald undir Jökli was "one of the most amazing things I've ever done in my life."

After spending 6 years with Quarashi, Hössi became bored with making music and performing. He also claimed that he was forgetting how to speak Icelandic due to being away from Iceland for long periods of time. Because of these two reasons, Hössi left Quarashi in December 2002. Quarashi announced Hössi's departure from the group on their official messageboard on 3 January 2003.

In August 2006, Hössi Ólafsson joined the Icelandic alternative pop band, Ske, as the lead singer.

== Performance style ==
Hössi has a deep low pitched voice when he talks and sings, but a high pitched nasally voice when he raps which some have compared to Rage Against the Machine frontman, Zack de la Rocha, and King Ad-Rock from Beastie Boys. This was used as a point of criticism when Quarashi released Jinx in 2002, as some felt that Hössi's voice made the group sound like a Beastie Boys rip-off. Hössi's voice was noticeably higher on Switchstance and Quarashi's 1997 full-length debut album than it was on his last two albums with the group. This could be because of Hössi's well known chain smoking habit.
