= Mr. Jinx =

Mr. Jinx or Mr. Jinks can mean:

- Mr. Jinks, cat from the cartoon Pixie & Dixie and Mr. Jinks, part of The Huckleberry Hound Show
- Mr Jinks (1926–1952), British racehorse
- Mr. Jinx, cat from the movie Meet the Parents and subsequent sequels
- "Mr. Jinx" (song), song by Quarashi
- Mr. Jinx, alien crewman from the webcomic Starslip Crisis

== See also ==
- Jinx
- Mr. Jinks Buys a Dress, 1913 short film featuring Eleanor Caines
