= Ske (disambiguation) =

Ske or SKE may refer to:

- Ske, an Icelandic band
- Ske or Seke language, spoken in Vanuatu
- Skewen railway station, Wales, National Rail station code
- Skien Airport, Geiteryggen, Norway, IATA code
- Symmetric key encryption
- SKE48, a band in Nagoya, Aichi, Japan
