= Bahama (disambiguation) =

The Bahamas are a country within the Lucayan Archipelago of the West Indies in the Caribbean.

Bahama or Bahamas may also refer to:

- Bahama, North Carolina, an unincorporated community in northern Durham County
- Bahamas (musician) or Afie Jurvanen (born 1981), Canadian musician
- "Bahama" (song), a 2008 single by Ingó og Veðurguðirnir
- "Bahama", a 2024 song by aespa from their album Armageddon
- HMBS Bahamas (P-60), an offshore patrol vessel operated by the Royal Bahamas Defence Force
- HMS Bahamas, a frigate that served in the British Royal Navy from 1943 to 1946
- Spanish ship Bahama, a 74-gun ship of the line
- LMS Jubilee Class 5596 Bahamas, a British steam locomotive
- Bahamas (magazine), a political magazine associated with the Anti-Germans

== See also ==
- Bahama Banks, the submerged carbonate platforms that make up much of the Bahama Archipelago
- Bahama Breeze, an American restaurant chain
- "I'm Born Again/Bahama Mama", a double-A-side single by Boney M.
- Bahama oriole (Icterus northropi), a species of bird in the family Icteridae endemic to the Bahamas
- Bahamas Stakes, a horse race run annually in Hialeah, Florida
- Bahamasair, an airline based in Nassau, Bahamas
- Grand Bahama, the northernmost of the islands of the Bahamas
- Tommy Bahama, a Seattle-based brand
