= Switchstance =

Switchstance may refer to:

- Switch stance, in board sports, standing opposite to ones natural standing position
- Switchstance (album), 1996 Quarashi album
