= Xeneizes =

Studio album by Quarashi
- Released: October 25, 1999
- Length: 47:06
- Label: Japis
- Producer: Sölvi Blöndal

Quarashi chronology
Quarashi (1997)	Xeneizes (1999)	Kristnihald undir Jökli (2001)

Xeneizes is an album by the Icelandic hip hop group Quarashi, released on October 25, 1999 in Iceland.

== Track listing ==
1. "Stick 'Em Up" (featuring Omar Swarez) – 3:49
2. "Tarfur" – 2:43
3. "Punk" (featuring Omar Swarez) – 2:59
4. "Jivin' About" – 3:50
5. "Brasilian Mongo" [Instrumental] – 3:22
6. "Model Citizen" – 3:50
7. "Tambourine Cut" – 2:44
8. "Xeneizes" – 3:08
9. "Mayday" (featuring Úlfur Kolka) – 3:35
10. "Surreal Rhyme" – 4:17
11. "Show Me What You Can" – 3:12
12. "Fuck You Puto" – 3:05
13. "Dive In" – 4:00
14. "Bless" [Instrumental] – 2:24

Bonus Media on CD

15. Fly To The Sky (Bonus Track)

16. Stay Funky [Instrumental] (Bonus Track)

17. Show Me What You Can [Instrumental] (Bonus Track)

18. Mayday [A Capella] (Bonus Track)

== Personnel ==
- Hössi Olafsson - Rapper, Singer on "Dive In"
- Steini a.k.a. Stoney - Rapper, Singer on "Jivin' About"
- Sölvi Blöndal - Producer, Drummer, Keyboardist, Percussionist
- DJ Dice - DJ
- Omar Swarez - Rapper
- Úlfur Kolka - Rapper
- Hrannar Ingimarsson - Producer, Engineer, Mixing, Keyboardist
- Gaukur Úlfarsson - Bassist
- Smári "Tarfur" Jósepsson - Guitarist
- Vidar Hákon Gislason - Guitarist
