= Halleluwah =

Icelandic musical band

Halleluwah is an Icelandic musical band fronted by singer and hip hop artist Sölvi Blöndal, a member of the famous band Quarashi. Blöndal formed Halleluwah finding success with "K2R" and "Whiplashes" they released the charting single "Blue Velvet" that features on lead vocals Raketa, real name Rakel Mjöll, who had been a vocalist in Útidúr and Sykur.

== Discography ==
=== Singles ===
| Year | Single | Peak positions | Album |
| Year | Single | ISL | Album |
|---|---|---|---|
| 2013 | "Blue Velvet" (feat. Raketa) | 19 | |
