= Óskar Páll Sveinsson =

Óskar Páll Sveinsson (also known as Oscar Paul) is an Icelandic producer, sound engineer and programmer.

He co-wrote and produced "Is it True?", the Icelandic entry in the Eurovision Song Contest 2009 in Moscow. It was sung by the Icelandic singer Yohanna and took second place in the finals.
