= Icelandic Confederation of Labour =

Association of trade unions in Iceland

ASÍ
- Icelandic Confederation of Labour
- Alþýðusamband Íslands

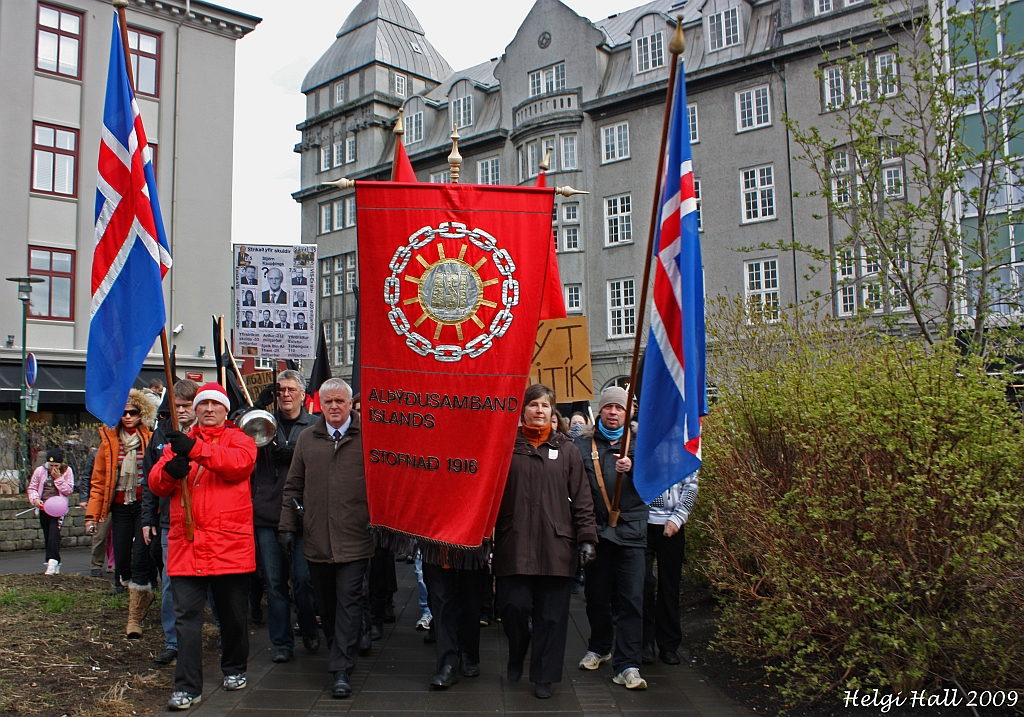
- Rally in 2009
- Founded: 1916
- Headquarters: Reykjavík, Iceland
- Location: Iceland
- Members: 73,000
- Key people: Drífa Snædal, chair
- Affiliations: ITUC, ETUC, TUAC, NFS
- Website: www.asi.is

The Icelandic Confederation of Labour (ASÍ) (Icelandic: Alþýðusamband Íslands) is a trade union centre in Iceland. It was formed in 1916 and has a membership of 104,500, approximately half of the Icelandic workforce.

The ASÍ is affiliated with the International Trade Union Confederation, the European Trade Union Confederation, and the Council of Nordic Trade Unions. In October 2018 Drífa Snædal became the first female leader of the union.

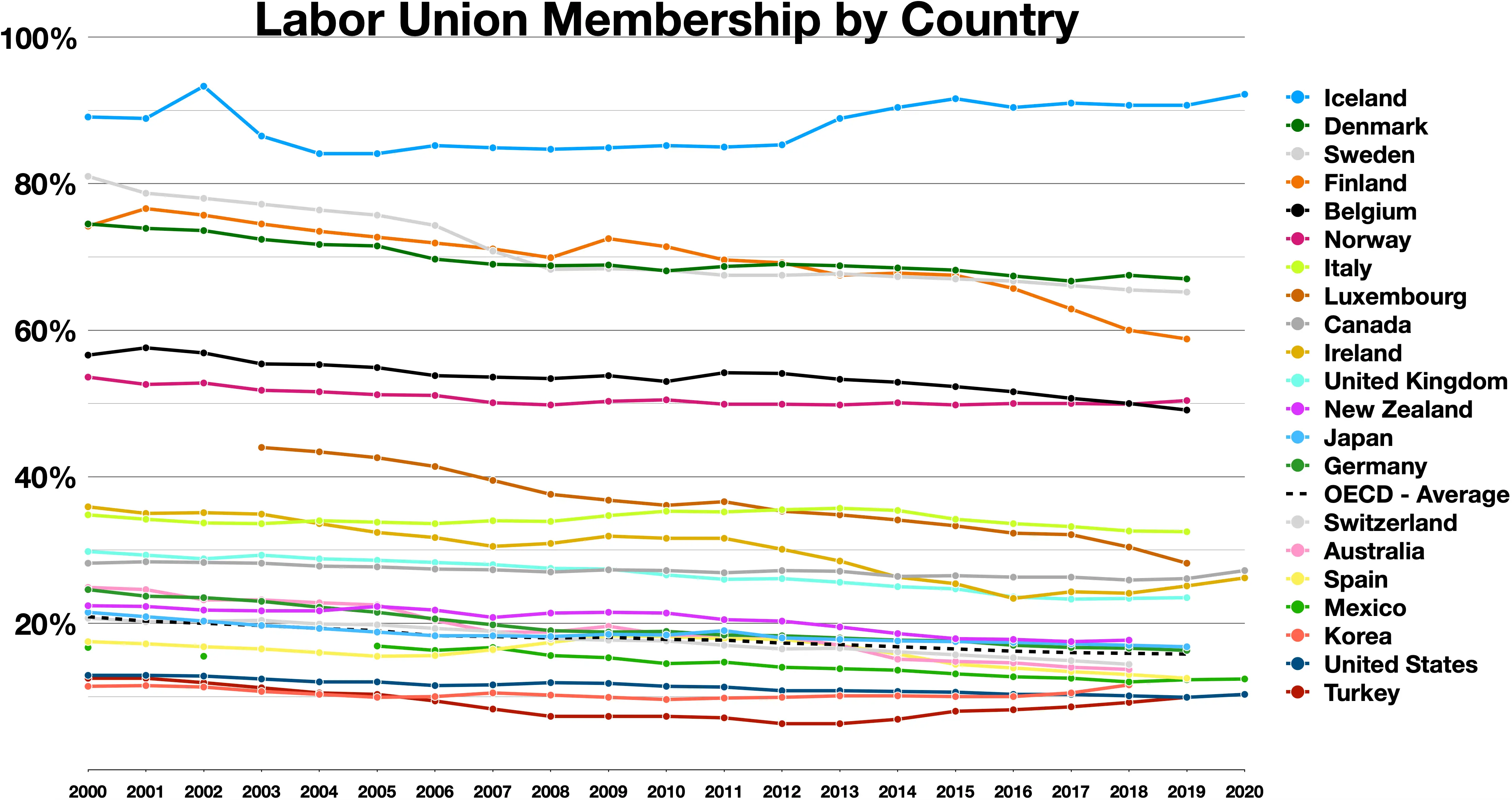
Labor union membership by country

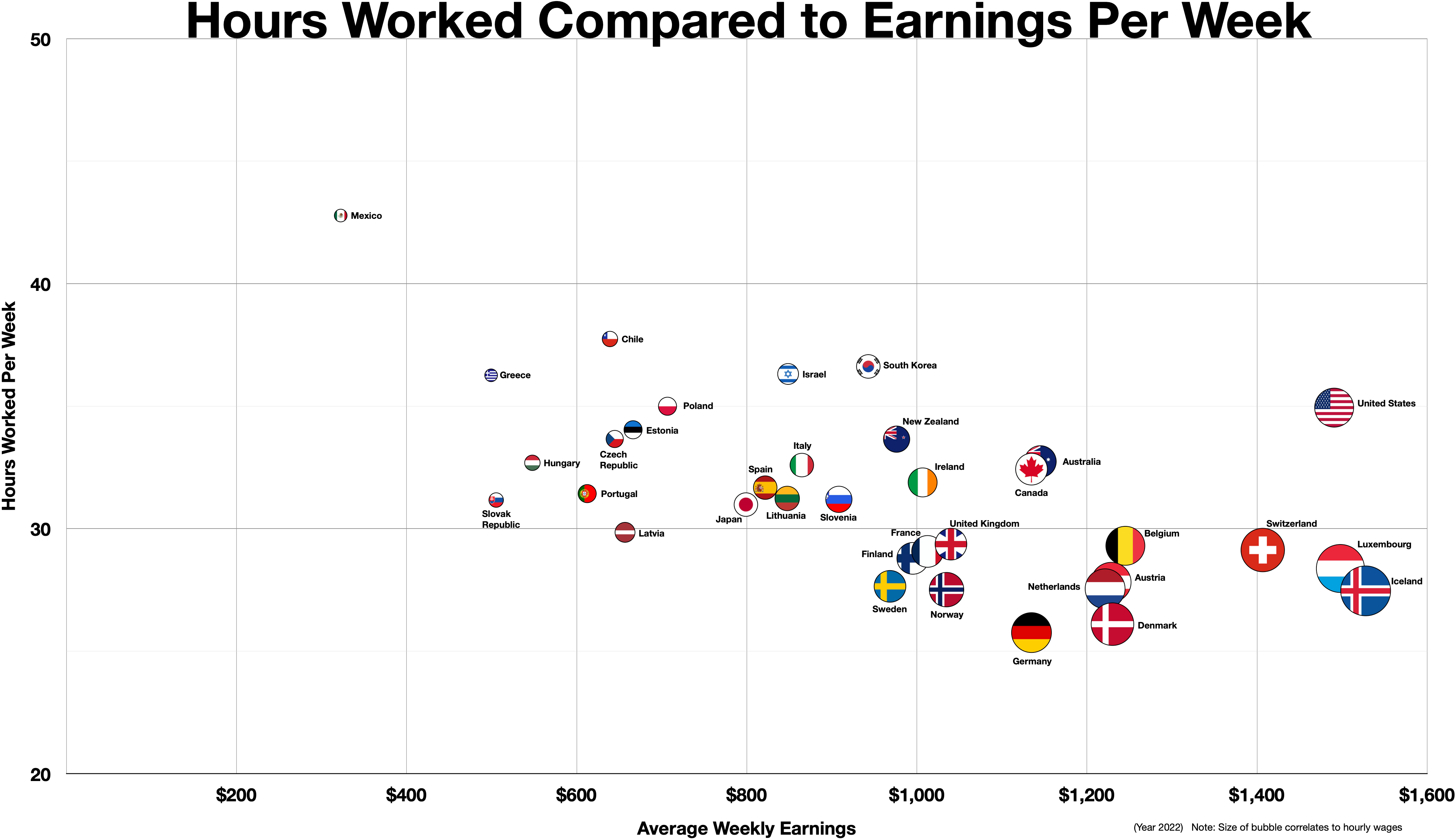
Hours Worked Compared to Earnings Per Week

== Affiliates ==
There are five federations affiliated to the ASÍ:

- Icelandic Electrical Industry Union
- Icelandic Fishermen's Union
- Icelandic Trade Union Federation
- National Union of Icelandic Traders
- Samiðn

In addition, six trade unions are directly affiliated to the ASÍ:

- Icelandic Dairy Union
- Icelandic Flight Attendants' Association
- Leiðsögn
- MATVÍS (Icelandic Food and Catering Workers' Union)
- Union of Hairdressers
- VM

== Presidents ==
1916: Ottó N. Þorláksson
1918: Jón Baldvinsson
1938: Stefán Jóhann Stefánsson
1940:
1942: Guðgeir Jónsson
1944: Hermann Guðmundsson
1948: Helgi Hannesson
1954: Hannibal Valdimarsson
1971: Björn Jónsson
1973: Snorri Jónsson (acting)
1974: Björn Jónsson
1978: Snorri Jónsson (acting)
1980: Ásmundur Stefánsson
1992: Benedikt Davíðsson
1996: Grétar Þorsteinsson
2008: Gylfi Arnbjörnsson
2018: Drífa Snædal
