= Guerilla Disco =

- The Icelandic cover art of Guerilla Disco.

Studio album by Quarashi
- Released: Iceland - 2004 / Japan - 2005
- Label: Skifan / Dennis : Sony Music Entertainment Japan
- Producer: Sölvi Blöndal

Quarashi chronology
Jinx (2002)	Guerilla Disco (2004)	Anthology (2011)

Japanese cover
- The Japanese cover art of Guerilla Disco.

Guerilla Disco is the first album from Quarashi with new rapper Tiny. The album was originally going to be called Payback (the name of the opening track), but was later changed to Guerilla Disco, the name of an older Quarashi instrumental. This is the fifth and final studio album before the band's breakup on 5 August 2005.

== Detail ==
On 3 January 2003 Quarashi announced that their lead vocalist, Hossi, was leaving. In mid-2003 rapper Opee joined long enough to release "Mess It Up" which became a big hit in Iceland that summer. He also did some other songs with them, including 'Shady Lives, Orð Morð' and other demos. Later that year the band announced that the rapper Tiny had joined, and announced a new song for download.

Quarashi continued to work on the album throughout 2004. The first official single released for Guerilla Disco was "Stun Gun", which was popular in Iceland. The album was released in November 2004 in Iceland and, after securing a deal with Sony Japan, in March 2005 in Japan. The Japanese release's art was designed by Omar Swarez, a member of the band. The band broke up several months after the Japanese release.

== Track listing ==
=== Icelandic version ===
1. Payback 3:32
2. Dead Man Walking 3:08
3. Stars 3:47
4. Audio Amigos 2:54
5. Stun Gun 3:25
6. Murder Frenzy 2:12
7. Brass Knuckles 3:17
8. Straight Jacket 3:30
9. Pro 3:50
10. Steua 1:15
11. Make A Move 3:04
12. This Song 7:28
13. Crazy Bastard (Featuring instrumental mentioned below)

=== Japanese version ===
1. Payback 3:32
2. Stun Gun 3:25
3. Stars 3:47
4. Audio Amigos 2:45
5. Brass Knuckles 3:17
6. Murder Frenzy 2:00
7. Pro 3:50
8. Steua 1:15
9. Race City 3:45
10. Make a Move 3:04
11. This Song 7:28
12. Straight Jacket 3:30
13. Stars (Hermigervill Remix) 4:32
14. Stun Gun (The People VS. Quarashi) 3:45
15. Kintarou 0:56
