= Butterflies and Elvis =

Studio album by Yohanna
- Released: 2009
- Recorded: 2008–2009
- Genres: Acoustic, pop, soul pop
- Length: 41:13
- Label: Warner
- Producers: Lee Horrocks, Maria Björk

Yohanna chronology
Ég sjálf (2001)	Butterflies and Elvis (2009)

Singles from Butterflies and Elvis
- 1. "Is It True?" Released: January 31, 2009; 2. "I Miss You" Released: 2009; 3. "Indian Ropetrick" Released: 2012

Butterflies and Elvis is the debut studio album by Icelandic singer Yohanna, released by Warner Music in Sweden and in other European countries. It was primarily produced by Lee Horrocks, with additional contribution from Maria Björk.

== Release and reception ==
"Is It True?" is the first single taken from the album. The song was the Icelandic entry in the Eurovision Song Contest 2009, it achieved 174 points in the first semifinal and placed 1st. In the final the song received 218 points and placed 2nd making it the best Icelandic entry since Selma's "All Out of Luck" in the Eurovision Song Contest 1999. The song charted in many European countries peaking at #14 in the European Hot 100 Singles, #2 in the Swedish charts, #3 in the Danish and Norwegian Singles Chart and #1 in the Icelandic Singles Chart.

The second single "I Miss You" was released digitally in Summer 2009 with a music video accompanying the song.

== Track listing ==
2009 Swedish release

1. "Is It True?" (Óskar Páll Sveinsson, Tinatin Japaridze, Chris Neil) – 3:00
2. "Beautiful Silence" (Lee Horrocks, Johanna Gudrun Jonsdottir) – 3:51
3. "I Miss You" (Lee Horrocks) – 3:51
4. "Butterflies and Elvis" (Lee Horrocks, Johanna Gudrun Jonsdottir) – 4:49
5. "Funny Thing Is" (Lee Horrocks, Johanna Gudrun Jonsdottir) – 3:40
6. "Worryfish" (Lee Horrocks) – 3:42
7. "Spaceman" (Lee Horrocks) – 3:36
8. "Say Goodbye" (Lee Horrocks, Andrea Remanda) – 3:17
9. "Rainbow Girl" (Lee Horrocks, Johanna Gudrun Jonsdottir) – 2:49
10. "The River Is Dry" (Lee Horrocks, Anthony Krizan) – 3:34
11. "Walking On Water" (Lee Horrocks, Johanna Gudrun Jonsdottir) – 4:13
12. "White Bicycle" (Lee Horrocks, Johanna Gudrun Jonsdottir) – 3:31
13. "Indian Ropetrick" – 3:58 [iTunes bonus track]

2008 Icelandic and 2009 International release

1. "Beautiful Silence" (Lee Horrocks, Johanna Gudrun Jonsdottir) – 3:51
2. "Say Goodbye" (Lee Horrocks, Andrea Remanda) – 3:17
3. "Indian Ropetrick" – 3:58
4. "Butterflies and Elvis" (Lee Horrocks, Johanna Gudrun Jonsdottir) – 4:49
5. "Funny Thing Is" (Lee Horrocks, Johanna Gudrun Jonsdottir) – 3:40
6. "Worryfish" (Lee Horrocks) – 3:42
7. "Lose Myself" – 2:19
8. "Spaceman" (Lee Horrocks) – 3:36
9. "I Miss You" (Lee Horrocks) – 3:51
10. "Rainbow Girl" (Lee Horrocks, Johanna Gudrun Jonsdottir) – 2:49
11. "The River Is Dry" (Lee Horrocks, Anthony Krizan) – 3:34
12. "Walking On Water" (Lee Horrocks, Johanna Gudrun Jonsdottir) – 4:13
13. "White Bicycle" (Lee Horrocks, Johanna Gudrun Jonsdottir) – 3:31

== Charts ==
Chart (2009)	Peak position
Swedish Album Chart	19
