= Merzedes Club =

Icelandic pop music group

- Origin: Reykjavík, Iceland
- Genres: Pop; dance-pop
- Years active: 2007–2008 · 2025–present
- Labels: Cod Music
- Past members: Rebekka; Ceres 4; Gillz; Gaz-man; Party-Hanz

Merzedes Club (commonly misspelled Mercedes Club) was a band created by prolific music composer and producer Barði Jóhannson. The group was formed to perform Barði's song "Ho, Ho, Ho, We Say Hey, Hey, Hey" at the national selection for Iceland in the Eurovision Song Contest 2008. The band gained extreme notoriety for their unusual stage performances. As of October 2008 the band is mostly defunct, and Rebekka has left the band.

== Eurovision Song Contest ==
Barði Jóhannsson introduced 3 new songs to compete in the contest. "Ho, Ho, Ho, We say Hey, Hey, Hey" was his only song to make it to the national selection for Iceland in the Eurovision Song Contest finals. They took the second place, although media-hype had claimed that it would win and that the contest was already over. The song became a hit and got to number 1 on the charts and stayed there for weeks and is the biggest hit 2008 so far this year in Bulgaria.

Fellow contestant in the Eurovision Song Contest, frontman of Eurobandið Friðrik Ómar, verbally attacked the Merzedes Club members, but later claimed that he was ambushed by Merzedes Club contestants in the backroom after the finals, and did this out of rage. He then later dismissed this.

== Collaboration with Síminn ==
In April 2008, Merzedes Club announced the release of their first video for the song "Meira frelsi". Síminn paid them 10 million ISK to create the video, and used it as part of their advertising campaign. This led to some controversy because by Icelandic law it is illegal to advertise if it is not obvious that it is an advertisement.

The music video for "Meira Frelsi" sparked some controversy because of its similarities with Basshunter video for "Now You're Gone". Both videos are about a boy and a girl, that are talking to each other via cellphones before then later going to clubs. Both videos then end with a kiss. The video got 55.000 hits the first 24 hours and got to number 5 on YouTube for most popular music videos that day. The song got to number 43 on YouTube that week.

== Discography ==
=== Albums ===
- 2008: I Wanna Touch You

=== Singles ===
Song	Year	Chart (tonlist.is)
"Ho, Ho, Ho, We Say Hey, Hey, Hey"	2008	1
"Meira Frelsi"	2008	2
"I Wanna Touch You"	2008	6
"See Me Now"	2008	6
"Basscop"	2008	19

== Criticism ==
=== Appearance ===
The band has taken some criticism for over the top vanity and ego, especially from the band's frontman Egill "Gillzenegger" Einarsson. The manager, Valli Sport, has gotten his spotlight for managing this band. Valli Sport is known as a TV talk show host from the past and the manager for Pipar ad agency

=== Music ===
They have taken some heat for lip-syncing and outrageous stage performances, as well as the simplicity of the songs and lyrics, even Barði Jóhannson has stated that the first hit "Ho, Ho, Ho, We say Hey, Hey, Hey" took only 3 hours to write.
