= Þjóðhátíð =

Icelandic outdoor festival

National Festival Þjóðhátíð
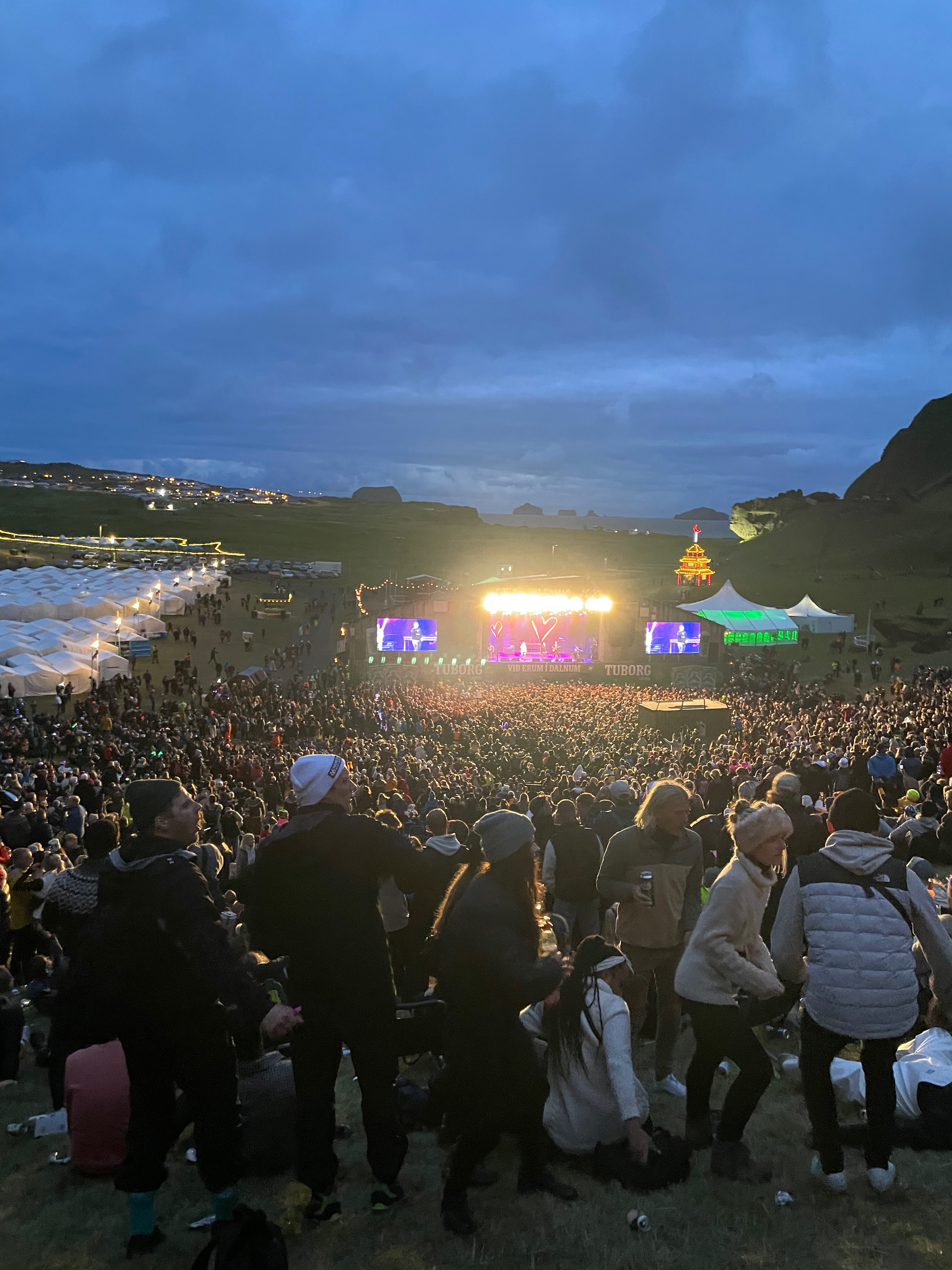
- Þjóðhátíð, 2022
- Dates: The weekend before the first Monday in August
- Frequency: Annual
- Venue: Herjólfsdalur, Vestmannaeyjar
- Locations: Vestmannaeyjar, Iceland
- Country: Iceland
- Years active: 1874–present
- Attendance: ~16,000
- Website: dalurinn.is

Þjóðhátíð (Icelandic pronunciation: [ˈθjouːðˌhauːˌtʰiːθ], "National Festival") is an annual outdoor festival held in Vestmannaeyjar island, Iceland, on the weekend before the first Monday in August. Locals and guests gather in Herjólfsdalur valley on the island of Heimaey for four days of various events, most prominently big stage concerts, bonfires, fireworks displays and the festival's signature Sunday night crowd singing.

In 2010 there was a record attendance of between 16,000 and 17,000 on the Sunday night. The local sports district association ÍBV (Íþróttabandalag Vestmannaeyja) organises and runs the festival.

Most participants stay in tents in and around the Herjólfsdalur valley. Hotels are also booked out as well as homestays being rented out for the weekend. Transport to and from the island is provided by the Herjólfur ferry to Landeyjarhöfn and flights from Vestmannaeyjar Airport. Private companies also operate smaller boat trips.

== History ==
Þjóðhátíð was first held in 1874 when islanders were prevented by bad weather from attending the celebration on the Icelandic mainland of the millennium of Icelandic settlement. The festival has grown to become the largest multiday festival in Iceland, and one of the largest annual cultural events in the country.

In 2011, a permanent main stage was constructed, replacing previous temporary structures. The Herjólfsdalur valley forms a natural amphitheatre for guests, where the main stage is located. A pond is located behind the main stage, adjacent to smaller stages and amenities and sales stands. On the east side of the valley, there are the 'White tents', where locals invite family, friends and the general public to their hospitality.

Due to the COVID-19 pandemic, the festival was not held in 2020 or 2021. This marked the first time it had not been held since WW1 in 1914 and 1915; Þjóðhátið was still held in 1973 despite the eruption on the island.

After a 2-year break, the festival took place in 2022 with around a 15,000 participants on Sunday.

== Brekkusöngur ==
The festival's signature Sunday night sing-along is known as brekkusöngur (lit. hill-song), named after the hill that forms the natural amphitheater from which visitors watch the main stage. From 1977 until 2012, the sing-along was led by Vestmannaeyjar local Árni Johnsen, a member of the Althing (Icelandic parliament), with the exception of the 2003 Þjóðhátíð when Róbert Marshall filled in as Árni sat in jail.

From 2013 the sing-along was led by Ingólfur Þórarinsson, another Vestmannaeyjar local. Ingólfur was slated to lead the sing-along again in 2021 but the organising committee cancelled amid anonymous allegations of sexual harassment and inappropriate behavior towards underage girls. Ingólfur denied the allegations, was never charged and later won a defamation case against Sindri Þór Sigríðarson in the Court of Appeal, who had alleged that Ingólfur had committed the aforementioned crimes in an opinion piece in a local newspaper.

Magnús Kjartan led the sing-along for the 2022 Þjóðhátíð.
