= Is It True? (Yohanna song) =

2009 song recorded by Jóhanna Guðrún Jónsdóttir

Single by Yohanna

from the album Butterflies and Elvis: Limited Edition
- Released: 31 January 2009
- Recorded: 2009
- Length: 3:04
- Label: Warner Music Sweden
- Songwriters: Óskar Páll Sveinsson; Tinatin Japaridze; Christopher Neil
- Producer: Óskar Páll Sveinsson

Yohanna singles chronology
"Is It True?" (2009)	"I Miss You" (2009)

Eurovision Song Contest 2009 entry
- Country: Iceland
- Artist: Jóhanna Guðrún Jónsdóttir
- As: Yohanna
- Language: English
- Composers: Óskar Páll Sveinsson; Tinatin Japaridze; Christopher Neil
- Lyricists: Óskar Páll Sveinsson; Tinatin Japaridze; Christopher Neil

Finals performance
- Semi-final result: 1st
- Semi-final points: 174
- Final result: 2nd
- Final points: 218

Entry chronology
- ◄ "This Is My Life" (2008)
- "Je ne sais quoi" (2010) ►

"Is It True?" is a song by Icelandic singer Yohanna, the Icelandic entry in the Eurovision Song Contest 2009 in Moscow, Russia. The song was composed by Óskar Páll Sveinsson and won second place in the contest. The song was also recorded in Spanish ("Si te vas"), German ("War es nur"), Russian ("Я не сплю" / "Ya ne splyu") and French ("Si tu sais").

Yohanna performed the song in the first semi-final on 12 May 2009, where it came in first place with 174 points, qualifying for the final. In the final, the song came in second place overall with 218 points. That made it the most successful Icelandic song entry to the Eurovision contest since 1999, when Selma placed second with the song All Out of Luck.

"Is It True?" reached No. 1 in the Icelandic Singles Chart. It became a Top 10 hit in Sweden, Norway, Finland, Greece, Switzerland, and also charted in Belgium, Denmark, Ireland, Russia, Slovakia, the UK, and reaching #14 in the European Hot 100 chart, making it the second best-selling Eurovision entry of the year, only surpassed by Alexander Rybak's winning song "Fairytale".

The song was made available as a single, and included on the official Eurovision Song Contest album. Yohanna released an album in 2008, Butterflies and Elvis, which did not include the song as it had not yet been recorded; however, a limited edition of the album was released in 2009 which included "Is It True?".

== Charts ==
Chart (2009)	Peak position
Belgian Flanders Chart	23
Belgian Wallonia Chart	65
Danish Singles Chart	16
Estonian Airplay Chart	33
European Hot 100 Singles	14
Finnish Singles Chart	4
Greek Billboard Singles Chart	4
Iceland (RÚV)	1
Irish Singles Chart	28
Norwegian Singles Chart	3
Slovakian IFPI Singles Chart	84
Swedish Singles Chart	2
Swiss Singles Chart	9
UK Singles Chart	49

=== Sales and certifications ===
Chart	Certification	Sales/Shipments
Sweden	Gold	10,000
