= Baggalútur =

Icelandic musical band

Baggalútur is an Icelandic musical band. The band performs original songs. popular Icelandic songs and Icelandic renditions of international hits from various genres. Baggalútur also performs on annual Christmas celebrations.

Their album Mamma þarf að djamma topped the Icelandic charts throughout November and December 2013; including the Christmas chart. The title track "Mamma þarf að djamma" featuring the vocals of Jóhanna Guðrún was number 1 in the Icelandic Singles Charts, Tónlist, 13 consecutive weeks. At the time it was the largest selling single for 2013.

== Members ==
- Bragi Valdimar Skúlason
- Guðmundur Kristinn Jónsson
- Guðmundur Pálsson
- Karl Sigurðsson
- Garðar Þorsteinn Guðgeirsson
- Haraldur Hallgrímsson
- Jóhann Bragi Fjalldal

== Discography ==
=== Albums ===
- 2005: Pabbi þarf að vinna
- 2006: Aparnir í Eden
- 2006: Jól og blíða
- 2008: Nýjasta nýtt
- 2009: Sólskinið í Dakota
- 2010: Næstu jól
- 2010: Síðustu jól - Jólatónleikar Baggalúts 2009
- 2011: Áfram Ísland!
- 2011: Crazy Fast Icelandic Banjo Picking Frenzy
- 2013: Mamma þarf að djamma
- 2015: Jólaland

=== Singles ===
- 2001: "Gleðileg jól"
- 2003: "Áfram Ísland"
- 2004: "Kósíheit par exelans"
- 2005: "Pabbi þarf að vinna í nótt"
- 2005: "Sagan af Jesúsi"
- 2006: "Allt fyrir mig"
- 2006: "Gamlárspartý"
- 2007: "Sof þú mér hjá"
- 2007: "Ísland, ég elska þig"
- 2008: "Kósíkvöld í kvöld"
- 2008: "Þjóðhátíð '93"
- 2008: "Það koma vonandi jól"
- 2009: "Saman við á ný"
- 2009: "Þetta er búið"
- 2010: "Gærkvöldið"
- 2011: "Ónáðið ekki"
- 2011: "Lesbískar ninjavampírur á flótta"
- 2012: "Heims um bóleró"
- 2013: "Mamma þarf að djamma" (with Jóhanna Guðrún)
- 2013: "Allt"
- 2013: "Ég fell bara fyrir flugfreyjum"
- 2014: "Inni í eyjum"
- 2014: "Kalt á toppnum" (with Prins Póló)
- 2015: "Nú mega jólin fara fyrir mér"
- 2017: "Grenja" (with Salka Sól)
- 2017: "Stúfur" (with Friðrik Dór)
