= Iceland in the Eurovision Song Contest 2008 =

- Eurovision Song Contest 2008
- Participating broadcaster: Ríkisútvarpið (RÚV)
- Country: Iceland
- Selection process: Söngvakeppni Sjónvarpsins 2008
- Selection date: 23 February 2008

Competing entry
- Song: "This Is My Life"
- Artist: Eurobandið
- Songwriters: Örlygur Smári; Paul Oscar; Peter Fenner

Placement
- Semi-final result: Qualified (8th, 68 points)
- Final result: 14th, 64 points

Participation chronology

Iceland was represented at the Eurovision Song Contest 2008 with the song "This Is My Life", written by Örlygur Smári, Paul Oscar, and Peter Fenner, and performed by the duo Euroband. The Icelandic participating broadcaster, Ríkisútvarpið (RÚV), selected its entry through Söngvakeppni Sjónvarpsins 2008. The selection consisted of eleven heats, a Second Chance round, four semi-finals and a final, held between 6 October 2007 and 23 February 2008. Eight songs ultimately competed in the final, where "This Is My Life" performed by Eurobandið emerged as the winner exclusively through public televoting. The duo was renamed as Euroband for the Eurovision Song Contest. Songwriter Paul Oscar represented Iceland in 1997 with the song "Minn hinsti dans" where he placed twentieth in the competition.

Iceland was drawn to compete in the second semi-final of the Eurovision Song Contest which took place on 22 May 2008. Performing as the opening entry for the show in position 12, "This Is My Life" was announced among the 10 qualifying entries of the second semi-final and therefore qualified to compete in the final on 24 May. This marked the first time that Iceland qualified to the final of the Eurovision Song Contest from a semi-final since the introduction of semi-finals in 2004. It was later revealed that the Iceland placed eighth out of the 19 participating countries in the semi-final with 68 points. In the final, Iceland performed in position 11 and placed fourteenth out of the 25 participating countries, scoring 64 points.

== Background ==
Prior to the 2008 contest, Ríkisútvarpið (RÚV) had participated in the Eurovision Song Contest representing Iceland twenty times since its first entry in 1986. Its best placing in the contest to this point was second, achieved in 1999 with the song "All Out of Luck" performed by Selma. Since the introduction of a semi-final to the format of the Eurovision Song Contest in 2004, it has, to this point, yet to qualify to the final. In 2007, its song "Valentine Lost" performed by Eiríkur Hauksson failed to qualify to the final.

As part of its duties as participating broadcaster, RÚV organises the selection of its entry in the Eurovision Song Contest and broadcasts the event in the country. The broadcaster confirmed its intentions to participate at the 2008 contest on 10 July 2007. Since 2006, RÚV has used a national final to select its entry, a method that continued for its 2008 participation.

== Before Eurovision ==
=== Söngvakeppni Sjónvarpsins 2008 ===
Söngvakeppni Sjónvarpsins 2008 was the national final format developed by RÚV in order to select its entry for the Eurovision Song Contest 2008. The seventeen shows in the competition were broadcast on RÚV during the television programme Laugardagslögin, hosted by Ragnhildur Steinunn Jónsdóttir and Gísli Einarsson. The first sixteen shows were held at the RÚV studios in Reykjavík and the final took place at the Vetrargarðinum in Kópavogur.

==== Format ====
Thirty-three songs in total competed in Söngvakeppni Sjónvarpsins 2008, where the winner was determined after fifteen shows: eleven heats, a Second Chance round, four semi-finals and a final. Three songs competed in each heat between 6 October and 15 December 2007. The winning song from each heat qualified to the semi-finals, and a wildcard act was selected out of the two remaining non-qualifying acts. RÚV selected three of the eleven wildcards to compete in the Second Chance round on 12 January 2008, and the winning song qualified to the semi-finals. Three songs competed in each semi-final on 19 January 2008, 26 January 2008, 2 February 2008 and 9 February 2008, and the top two songs qualified to the final which took place on 23 February 2008. The results of all shows, including the wildcard selection, were determined by 100% public televoting. The televoting for the wildcard selection in each heat took place via radio on Rás 2 for a week, with the results being announced during the Rás 2 radio programme Helgarútgáfunni.

==== Competing entries ====
On 10 July 2007, RÚV opened the submission period for interested songwriters to submit their entries until the deadline on 3 September 2007. Songwriters were required to be Icelandic, possess Icelandic citizenship or have permanent residency in Iceland by 1 October 2007, and had the right to submit up to three entries. At the close of the submission deadline, 146 entries were received. A selection committee was formed in order to select the top six entries, while additional twenty-seven entries came from nine composers invited by RÚV to each create three entries for the competition. The invited composers were:

- Andrea Gylfadóttir
- Barði Jóhannsson
- Guðmundur Jónsson
- Gunnar L. Hjálmarsson (Dr. Gunni)
- Hafdís Huld Þrastardóttir
- Magnús Eiríksson
- Magnús Þór Sigmundsson
- Margret Kristin Sigurðardóttir
- Svala Björgvinsdóttir

Among the competing artists were previous Icelandic Eurovision entrants Pálmi Gunnarsson, who represented Iceland in 1986 as part of ICY, Einar Ágúst Víðisson, who represented Iceland in 2000 as part of August and Telma, and Birgitta Haukdal, who represented Iceland in 2003.

Artist	Song	Songwriter(s)	Selection
Ali Mobli, Harold Burr, Hildur Guðný Þórhallsdóttir, Sigurður Þór Óskarsson and Soffía Karlsdóttir	"Friður á þessari jörð"	Barði Jóhansson	Invited by RÚV
Andrea Gylfadóttir	"Flower of Fire"	Andrea Gylfadóttir	Invited by RÚV
Andrea Gylfadóttir	"Vocalise"	Andrea Gylfadóttir	Invited by RÚV
Áslaug Helga Hálfdánardóttir	"Lífsins leið"	Áslaug Helga Hálfdánardóttir	Open submission
Baggalútur	"Hvað var það sem þú sást í honum?"	Magnús Eiríksson	Invited by RÚV
Birgitta Haukdal and Magni Ásgeirsson	"Núna veit ég"	Hafdís Huld Þrastardóttir	Invited by RÚV
Bjartur Guðjónsson	"The Girl in the Golden Dress"	Andrea Gylfadóttir	Invited by RÚV
Böðvar Rafn Reynisson and Tinna Marína Jónsdóttir	"Á ballið á"	Barði Jóhansson	Invited by RÚV
Davíð Þorsteinn Olgeirsson	"In Your Dreams"	Davíð Þorsteinn Olgeirsson	Open submission
Dr. Spock	"Hvar ertu nú?"	Gunnar L. Hjálmarsson	Invited by RÚV
Edgar Smári Atlason	"If I Fall In Love Again"	Svala Björgvinsdóttir	Invited by RÚV
Einar Ágúst Víðisson and Sigurjón Brink	"Straumurinn"	Guðmundur Jónsson	Invited by RÚV
Eurobandið	"Fullkomið líf"	Örlygur Smári	Open submission
Fabúla	"Bigger Shoes"	Margret Kristin Sigurðardóttir	Invited by RÚV
Fabúla and Martin Høybye	"Game Over"	Margret Kristin Sigurðardóttir	Invited by RÚV
Hafdís Huld Þrastardóttir	"Á gleymdum stað"	Hafdís Huld Þrastardóttir	Invited by RÚV
Hafdís Huld Þrastardóttir	"Boys and Perfume"	Hafdís Huld Þrastardóttir	Invited by RÚV
Haffi Haff	"The Wiggle Wiggle Song"	Svala Björgvinsdóttir	Invited by RÚV
Hara	"I Wanna Manicure"	Hallgrímur Óskarsson, Gerard James Borg	Open submission
Hrund Ósk Árnadóttir	"Í rússíbana"	Magnús Eiríksson	Invited by RÚV
Ína Valgerður Pétursdóttir, Seth Sharp and Berglind Ósk Guðgeirsdóttir	"Lullaby to Peace"	Magnús Þór Sigmundsson	Invited by RÚV
Menn ársins	"If You Were Here"	Þorarinn Freysson	Open submission
Merzedes Club	"Ho, Ho, Ho, We Say Hey, Hey, Hey"	Barði Jóhansson	Invited by RÚV
Páll Rósinkranz and Gospelkór Reykjavíkur	"Gef mér von"	Guðmundur Jónsson	Invited by RÚV
Pálmi Gunnarsson and Hrund Ósk Árnadóttir	"Leigubílar"	Magnús Eiríksson	Invited by RÚV
Ragnheiður Eiríksdóttir	"Ísinn"	Gunnar L. Hjálmarsson	Invited by RÚV
Ragnheiður Gröndal	"Don't Wake Me Up"	Margret Kristin Sigurðardóttir	Invited by RÚV
Ragnheiður Gröndal	"Skot í myrkri"	Magnús Þór Sigmundsson	Invited by RÚV
Seth Sharp	"I Won't Be Home Tonight"	Svala Björgvinsdóttir	Invited by RÚV
Seth Sharp	"Johnny"	Magnús Þór Sigmundsson	Invited by RÚV
Sigríður Thorlacius and Karl Sigurðsson	"Drepum tímann"	Gunnar L. Hjálmarsson	Invited by RÚV
Þóra Gísladóttir	"Að eilífu"	Guðmundur Jónsson	Invited by RÚV
Þóra Gísladóttir	"The Picture"	Hjörleifur Ingason	Open submission

==== Heats ====
The eleven heats took place between 6 October 2007 and 12 January 2008 where three acts presented their entries in each heat. The winning entry voted upon solely by public televoting qualified directly to the semi-finals, while one of the two remaining acts was awarded a wildcard following a separate televote.

Heat 1 – 6 October 2007
R/O	Artist	Song	Result
1	Hafdís Huld Þrastardóttir	"Boys and Perfume"	Wildcard
2	Fabúla and Martin Høybye	"Game Over"	—N/a
3	Páll Rósinkranz and Gospelkór Reykjavíkur	"Gef mér von"	Advanced

Heat 2 – 13 October 2007
R/O	Artist	Song	Result
1	Ragnheiður Eiríksdóttir	"Ísinn"	—N/a
2	Edgar Smári Atlason	"If I Fall In Love Again"	Wildcard
3	Pálmi Gunnarsson and Hrund Ósk Árnadóttir	"Leigubílar"	Advanced

Heat 3 – 20 October 2007
R/O	Artist	Song	Result
1	Ína Valgerður Pétursdóttir, Seth Sharp and Berglind Ósk Guðgeirsdóttir	"Lullaby to Peace"	Advanced
2	Andrea Gylfadóttir	"Vocalise"	—N/a
3	Böðvar Rafn Reynisson and Tinna Marína Jónsdóttir	"Á ballið á"	Wildcard

Heat 4 – 27 October 2007
R/O	Artist	Song	Result
1	Davíð Þorsteinn Olgeirsson	"In Your Dreams"	Advanced
2	Áslaug Helga Hálfdánardóttir	"Lífsins leið"	Wildcard
3	Þóra Gísladóttir	"The Picture"	—N/a

Heat 5 – 3 November 2007
R/O	Artist	Song	Result
1	Sigríður Thorlacius and Karl Sigurðsson	"Drepum tímann"	—N/a
2	Seth Sharp	"Johnny"	Wildcard
3	Merzedes Club	"Ho, Ho, Ho, We Say Hey, Hey, Hey"	Advanced

Heat 6 – 10 November 2007
R/O	Artist	Song	Result
1	Fabúla	"Bigger Shoes"	Wildcard
2	Baggalútur	"Hvað var það sem þú sást í honum?"	Advanced
3	Seth Sharp	"I Won't Be Home Tonight"	—N/a

Heat 7 – 17 November 2007
R/O	Artist	Song	Result
1	Einar Ágúst Víðisson and Sigurjón Brink	"Straumurinn"	Wildcard
2	Hafdís Huld Þrastardóttir	"Á gleymdum stað"	—N/a
3	Bjartur Guðjónsson	"The Girl in the Golden Dress"	Advanced

Heat 8 – 24 November 2007
R/O	Artist	Song	Result
1	Menn ársins	"If You Were Here"	—N/a
2	Eurobandið	"Fullkomið líf"	Advanced
3	Hara	"I Wanna Manicure"	Wildcard

Heat 9 – 1 December 2007
R/O	Artist	Song	Result
1	Dr. Spock	"Hvar ertu nú?"	Wildcard
2	Ragnheiður Gröndal	"Skot í myrkri"	—N/a
3	Birgitta Haukdal and Magni Ásgeirsson	"Núna veit ég"	Advanced

Heat 10 – 8 December 2007
R/O	Artist	Song	Result
1	Andrea Gylfadóttir	"Flower of Fire"	Wildcard
2	Þóra Gísladóttir	"Að eilífu"	—N/a
3	Ragnheiður Gröndal	"Don't Wake Me Up"	Advanced

Heat 11 – 15 December 2007
R/O	Artist	Song	Result
1	Ali Mobli, Harold Burr, Hildur Guðný Þórhallsdóttir, Sigurður Þór Óskarsson and Soffía Karlsdóttir	"Friður á þessari jörð"	—N/a
2	Hrund Ósk Árnadóttir	"Í rússíbana"	Wildcard
3	Haffi Haff	"The Wiggle Wiggle Song"	Advanced

==== Second Chance ====
Three of the eleven wildcards were selected to compete in the Second Chance round, which were announced on 6 January 2008. The three acts presented their entries in the Second Chance round on 12 January 2008 where "Hvar ertu nú?" performed by Dr. Spock was voted upon solely by public televoting to proceed to the semi-finals.

First Round – 6 January 2008
Artist	Song	Result
Andrea Gylfadóttir	"Flower of Fire"	—N/a
Áslaug Helga Hálfdánardóttir	"Lífsins leið"	—N/a
Böðvar Rafn Reynisson and Tinna Marína Jónsdóttir	"Á ballið á"	—N/a
Dr. Spock	"Hvar ertu nú?"	Advanced
Einar Ágúst Víðisson and Sigurjón Brink	"Straumurinn"	—N/a
Fabúla	"Bigger Shoes"	Advanced
Hafdís Huld Þrastardóttir	"Boys and Perfume"	Advanced
Hara	"I Wanna Manicure"	—N/a
Hrund Ósk Árnadóttir	"Í rússíbana"	—N/a
Pálmi Gunnarsson and Hrund Ósk Árnadóttir	"Leigubílar"	—N/a
Seth Sharp	"Johnny"	—N/a

Second Round – 12 January 2008
R/O	Artist	Song	Result
1	Hafdís Huld Þrastardóttir	"Boys and Perfume"	—N/a
2	Fabúla	"Bigger Shoes"	—N/a
3	Dr. Spock	"Hvar ertu nú?"	Advanced

==== Semi-finals ====
The four semi-finals took place on 19 January, 26 January, 2 February and 9 February 2008. In each semi-final three acts presented their entries, and the top two entries voted upon solely by public televoting proceeded to the final. Birgitta Haukdal, who was scheduled to perform her song with Magni Ásgeirsson in the first semi-final, did not appear during the show as she was on holiday.

Semi-Final 1 – 19 January 2008
R/O	Artist	Song	Result
1	Magni Ásgeirsson	"Núna veit ég"	Advanced
2	Ína Valgerður Pétursdóttir, Seth Sharp and Berglind Ósk Guðgeirsdóttir	"Lullaby to Peace"	—N/a
3	Páll Rósinkranz and Gospelkór Reykjavíkur	"Gef mér von"	Advanced

Semi-Final 2 – 26 January 2008
R/O	Artist	Song	Result
1	Davíð Þorsteinn Olgeirsson	"In Your Dreams"	Advanced
2	Bjartur Guðjónsson	"The Girl in the Golden Dress"	—N/a
3	Baggalútur	"Hvað var það sem þú sást í honum?"	Advanced

Semi-Final 3 – 2 February 2008
R/O	Artist	Song	Result
1	Pálmi Gunnarsson and Hrund Ósk Árnadóttir	"Leigubílar"	—N/a
2	Eurobandið	"Fullkomið líf"	Advanced
3	Dr. Spock	"Hvar ertu nú?"	Advanced

Semi-Final 4 – 9 February 2008
R/O	Artist	Song	Result
1	Haffi Haff	"The Wiggle Wiggle Song"	—N/a
2	Ragnheiður Gröndal	"Don't Wake Me Up"	Advanced
3	Merzedes Club	"Ho, Ho, Ho, We Say Hey, Hey, Hey"	Advanced

==== Final ====
The final took place on 23 February 2008 where the eight entries that qualified from the preceding four semi-finals competed. Eurobandið performed their entry in Icelandic in the heat and semi-final, however, they presented their entry in English in the final. The winner, "This Is My Life" performed Eurobandið, was determined solely by televoting that registered more than 100,000 votes. In addition to the performances of the competing artists, the show was opened by a medley featuring past Icelandic Eurovision entrants performing their songs.

Final – 23 February 2008
R/O	Artist	Song	Place
1	Davíð Þorsteinn Olgeirsson	"In Your Dreams"	—
2	Páll Rósinkranz and Gospelkór Reykjavíkur	"Gef mér von"	—
3	Eurobandið	"This Is My Life"	1
4	Ragnheiður Gröndal	"Don't Wake Me Up"	—
5	Merzedes Club	"Ho, Ho, Ho, We Say Hey, Hey, Hey"	2
6	Baggalútur	"Hvað var það sem þú sást í honum?"	—
7	Birgitta Haukdal and Magni Ásgeirsson	"Núna veit ég"	—
8	Dr. Spock	"Hvar ertu nú?"	3

==== Ratings ====
Viewing figures by show
Show	Air date	Viewing figures	
Show	Air date	Nominal	Share
Final	23 February 2008	184,100	79.8%

=== Promotion ===
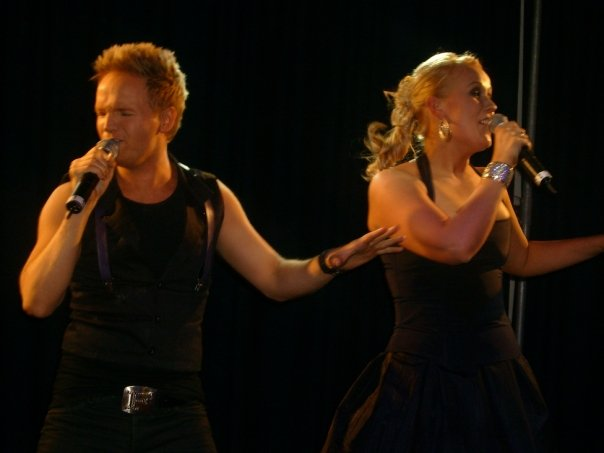
Euroband performing during the UKEurovision Preview Party in London

Euroband made several appearances across Europe to specifically promote "This Is My Life" as the Icelandic Eurovision entry. On 24 April, Euroband was one of the guest performers of 1995 Icelandic Eurovision entrant Björgvin Halldórsson's Jólagestir Björgvins concert which was held at the Circus Building in Copenhagen, Denmark. On 25 April, Euroband performed during the UKEurovision Preview Party event which was held at the Scala Club in London, United Kingdom and hosted by Paddy O'Connell.

== At Eurovision ==
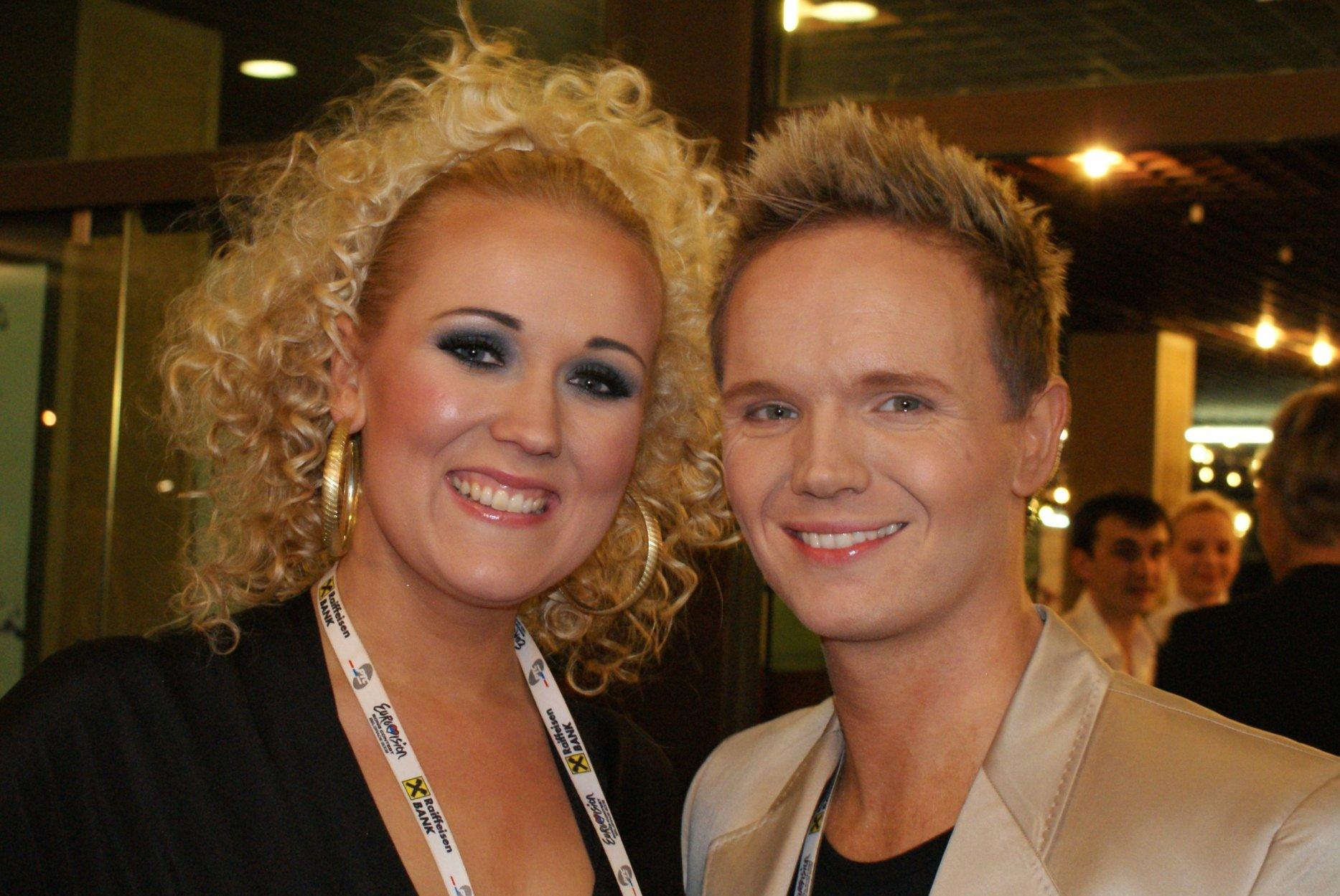
Euroband at the Eurovision Song Contest 2008

It was announced in September 2007 that the competition's format would be expanded to two semi-finals in 2008. According to Eurovision rules, all nations with the exceptions of the host country and the "Big Four" (France, Germany, Spain and the United Kingdom) are required to qualify from one of two semi-finals in order to compete for the final; the top nine songs from each semi-final as determined by televoting progress to the final, and a tenth was determined by back-up juries. The European Broadcasting Union (EBU) split up the competing countries into six different pots based on voting patterns from previous contests, with countries with favourable voting histories put into the same pot. On 28 January 2008, a special allocation draw was held which placed each country into one of the two semi-finals. Iceland was placed into the second semi-final, to be held on 22 May 2008. The running order for the semi-finals was decided through another draw on 17 March 2008 and Iceland was set to open the show and perform in position 1, before the entry from Sweden.

The two semi-finals and the final were broadcast in Iceland on RÚV with commentary by Sigmar Guðmundsson. RÚV appointed Brynja Þorgeirsdóttir as its spokesperson to announce the Icelandic votes during the final.

=== Semi-final ===
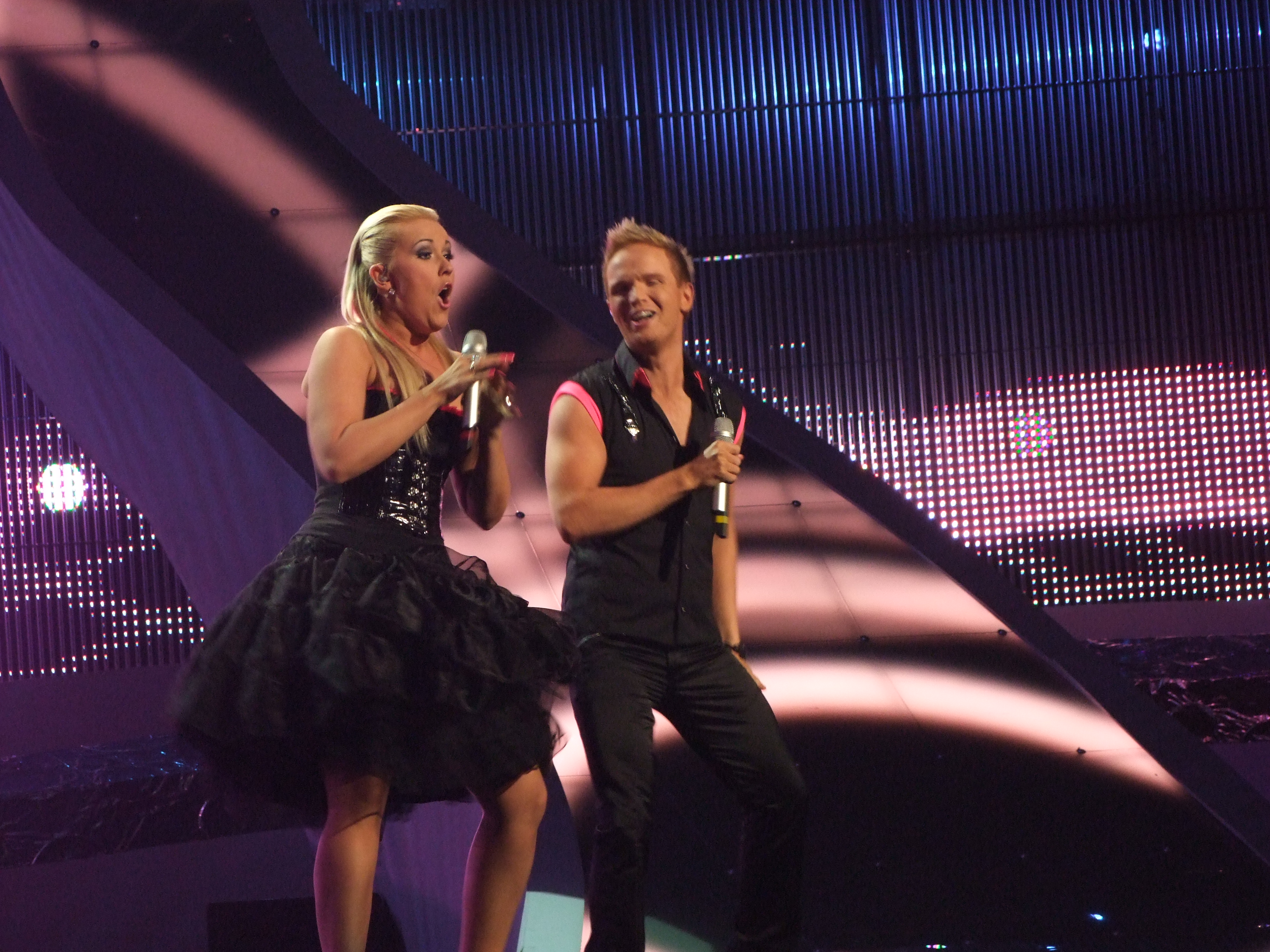
Euroband during a rehearsal before the second semi-final

Euroband took part in technical rehearsals on 13 and 16 May, followed by dress rehearsals on 21 and 22 May. The Icelandic performance featured the members of Euroband dressed in black and pink outfits and performing choreography, joined on stage by four backing vocalists in black outfits. The stage lighting were in deep blue and white colours. The backing vocalists that joined Euroband were: Grétar Örvarsson, Guðrún Gunnarsdóttir, Hera Björk Þórhallsdóttir and Pétur Örn Guðmundsson. Grétar Örvarsson previously represented Iceland in 1990 and 1992 as part of Stjórnin and Heart 2 Heart, respectively, while Hera Björk Þórhallsdóttir would go on to represent Iceland in 2010.

At the end of the show, Iceland was announced as having finished in the top 10 and subsequently qualifying for the grand final. This marked the first time that Iceland qualified to the final of the Eurovision Song Contest from a semi-final since the introduction of semi-finals in 2004. It was later revealed that Iceland placed eighth in the semi-final, receiving a total of 68 points.

=== Final ===
Shortly after the second semi-final, a winners' press conference was held for the ten qualifying countries. As part of this press conference, the qualifying artists took part in a draw to determine the running order of the final. This draw was done in the order the countries appeared in the semi-final running order. Iceland was drawn to perform in position 11, following the entry from Poland and before the entry from Turkey.

Euroband once again took part in dress rehearsals on 23 and 24 May before the final. The duo performed a repeat of their semi-final performance during the final on 24 May. At the conclusion of the voting, Iceland finished in fourteenth place with 64 points.

=== Voting ===
Below is a breakdown of points awarded to Iceland and awarded by Iceland in the second semi-final and grand final of the contest. The nation awarded its 12 points to Denmark in the semi-final and the final of the contest.

==== Points awarded to Iceland ====
Points awarded to Iceland (Semi-final 2)
Score	Country
12 points	
10 points	Denmark; Sweden
8 points	France
7 points	Hungary
6 points	
5 points	Albania; Malta; Portugal
4 points	Switzerland; United Kingdom
3 points	Turkey
2 points	Latvia; Lithuania
1 point	Belarus; Cyprus; Ukraine

Points awarded to Iceland (Final)
Score	Country
12 points	Denmark
10 points	
8 points	Norway; Sweden
7 points	Finland; Portugal
6 points	Malta; United Kingdom
5 points	
4 points	Israel; Spain
3 points	
2 points	Latvia
1 point	

==== Points awarded by Iceland ====
Points awarded by Iceland (Semi-final 2)
Score	Country
12 points	Denmark
10 points	Portugal
8 points	Sweden
7 points	Latvia
6 points	Ukraine
5 points	Bulgaria
4 points	Croatia
3 points	Malta
2 points	Georgia
1 point	Albania

Points awarded by Iceland (Final)
Score	Country
12 points	Denmark
10 points	Norway
8 points	France
7 points	Finland
6 points	Portugal
5 points	Ukraine
4 points	Latvia
3 points	Sweden
2 points	Serbia
1 point	Armenia
