= Bahama (song) =

Single by Ingó og Veðurguðirnir

from the album Góðar stundir
- Language: Icelandic
- Released: 2008
- Recorded: 2008
- Genre: Pop dance music
- Length: 3:39

Music video
- "Bahama" on YouTube

"Bahama" is an Icelandic 2008 summer hit song from the band Ingó og Veðurguðirnir showcasing Ingó Veðurguð on main vocals. The song also appears as track #2 on Ingó og Veðurguðirnir's 2009 album Góðar stundir.

The song stayed at the top of the Icelandic Singles Chart for 8 consecutive weeks during the summer of 2008.

== Charts ==
Chart performance for Bahama
Chart (2008)	Peak position
Iceland (Tonlist)	1
