= Mr. Jinx (song) =

Single by Quarashi

from the album Jinx
- Released: 2002
- Genre: Alternative hip hop
- Length: 4:10
- Label: Columbia/Time Bomb
- Producer: Sölvi Blöndal

Quarashi singles chronology
| "Stick 'Em Up" (2002) | "Mr. Jinx" (2002) | "Mess It Up" (2003) |

"Mr. Jinx" (titled as "Mr. Jinx (We've Got It Right)") is a 2002 hip-hop song by Quarashi, released as the second single from their U.S.-released debut album, Jinx. The song is remembered for its catchy, upbeat hook that was sampled from 1970s soul band New York City's song, "Sanity". The song also contains elements of funk, and has been described by Sölvi Blöndal, the producer of the Jinx album and a member of Quarashi, as sounding like something "made by a '60s brass band". Blöndal has said that "Mr. Jinx" is his favorite Quarashi song.

While "Mr. Jinx" was not a big hit for Quarashi (peaking at number 43 on Radio & Records' Alternative chart), the song has been used as background music for several TV shows, most notably as the song heard during commercials for NBA on TNT from 2003-2005. "Mr. Jinx" was also featured in the video game Madden NFL 2003.

== Music video ==
Directed by Charles Jensen and produced by Bob Sexton, the video is a homage to the 1998 film Run Lola Run, and stars Hössi Olafsson, one of the members of Quarashi, as himself, trying to get to a Quarashi gig on time. The music video for "Mr. Jinx" was released on September 3, 2002. It was voted as MTV's Viewers Pick for the week of September 20, 2002.
