= Ragnheiður Gröndal =

Icelandic singer (born 1984)

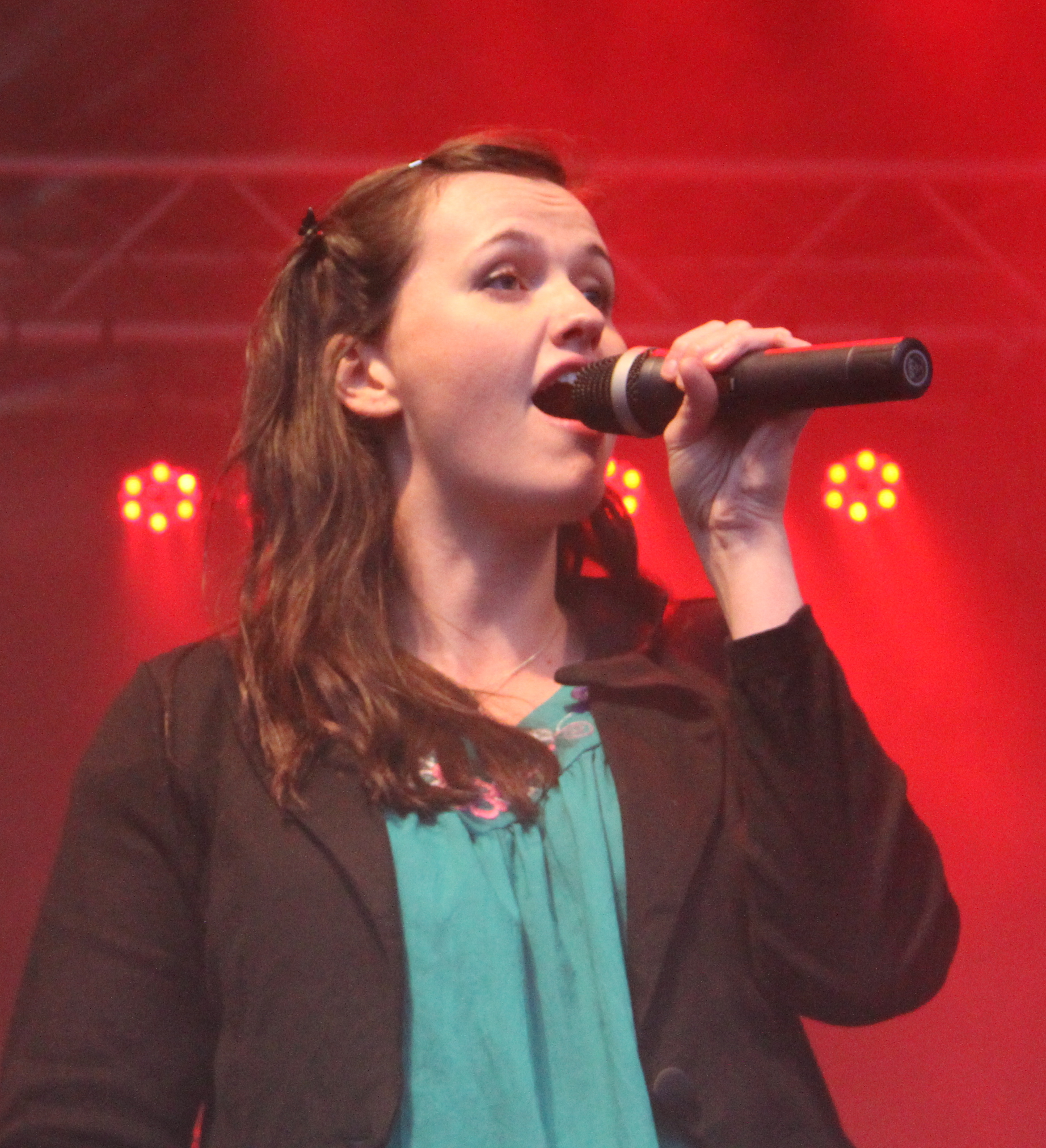
Ragnheiður Gröndal

Ragnheiður Gröndal or Ragga Gröndal (born 1984) is an Icelandic singer. She was described as Iceland's best-selling artist in 2006, and was named Icelandic Singer of the Year that same year. In 2007, she was a finalist in Söngvakeppni Sjónvarpsins; a competition looking for an artist to represent Iceland at the 2008 Eurovision Song Contest in Belgrade. She has collaborated with other Icelandic musicians, including the band, Ske, and Haukur Gröndal. She moved to Aalborg, Denmark in 2014.

== Discography ==
=== Albums ===
Solo

- 2005: After the Rain
- 2008: Bella & Her Black Coffee
- 2011: Astrocat Lullaby
- 2014: Svefnljóð
- 2019: Töfrabörn

Icelandic Folk Albums

- 2004: Vetrarljóð
- 2006: Þjóðlög
- 2009: Tregagás

=== Singles ===
- 2006: "Pabbi, gefðu mér íslenskan hest"
- 2014: "Svefnljóð"
