= Ske =

Icelandic band

- Also known as: Skárren Ekkert
- Origin: Iceland
- Years active: 1992–present
- Members: Eiríkur Þórleifsson; Frank Þórir Hall; Gudmundur Steingrimsson; Hrannar Ingimarsson; Jón Oddur Guðmundsson; Ágústa Eva Erlendsdóttir; Hössi Ólafsson
- Past members: Ragnheiður Gröndal; Kjartan Guðnason

Ske (formerly known as Skárren Ekkert) is an Icelandic band, founded in 1992 by Eiríkur Þórleifsson, Frank Þórir Hall, and Guðmundur Steingrímsson. They have released five albums under their original name and three as Ske.

== Band members ==
Current

- Eiríkur Þórleifsson
- Frank Þórir Hall
- Gudmundur Steingrimsson
- Hrannar Ingimarsson
- Jón Oddur Guðmundsson
- Ágústa Eva Erlendsdóttir
- Hössi Ólafsson

Past

- Ragnheiður Gröndal
- Kjartan Guðnason

== Discography ==
=== as Skárren Ekkert ===
- Kirsuberjagarðurinn (1994)
- Ein Stór Fjölskylda (1995)
- Konur Skelfa (1996)
- Ein (1997)
- NPK (1999)

=== as Ske ===
- Life, Death, Happiness & Stuff (2002)
- Feelings Are Great (2004)
- Love for You All (2009)
