= Kristnihald undir Jökli =

Studio album by Quarashi
- Released: 22 September 2001
- Recorded: 2001
- Genre: Soundtrack
- Length: 42:45
- Label: Sproti
- Producer: Sölvi Blöndal, Hössi Olafsson

Quarashi chronology
| 'Xeneizes' (1999) | Kristnihald undir Jökli (2001) | 'Jinx' (2002) |

Kristnihald undir Jökli is an album by Quarashi. It was released on 22 September 2001 in Iceland (see 2001 in music). The album contains mostly instrumental music written and produced by Quarashi founding members, Sölvi Blöndal and Hössi Olafsson as the soundtrack for the Halldór Laxness play, Kristnihald undir Jökli, itself based on his 1968 novel of the same title translated into English as Christianity at Glacier and republished since as Under the Glacier. The play was directed by Bergur Þór Ingólfsson, and ran in the Borgarleikhús in the winter of 2001.

== Track listing ==
1. "Úa" - 2:08
2. "Smíðavél" - 2:32
3. "Hulduhrútur" - 1:48
4. "Beitahúsamenn" - 3:47
5. "Prímus" - 5:02
6. "Godman Sýngmann" - 4:04
7. "Úrsúlulokkur" - 5:22
8. "Úrsúlugjá" - 2:15
9. "Umbi" - 5:11
10. "Prímus (80's)" - 3:09
11. "Umbi II" - 2:11
12. "Prímus (Vox)" - 2:31
13. "Úrsúlugjá (Instrumental)" - 2:13
