= Jinx (Quarashi album) =

Studio album by Quarashi
- Released: 9 April 2002
- Recorded: 2000–2001 at The Greenhouse, Green Garage Studios, Studio Syrland, and Sóltuni in Reykjavík, Iceland, The Crackhouse in New York City, and Ameraycan Studios in Los Angeles, California
- Genres: Rap metal; nu metal; alternative hip hop
- Length: 41:59/49:23 (Japanese release)
- Label: Columbia/Time Bomb Recordings
- Producers: Sölvi Blöndal, Brendan O' Brien, DJ Muggs

Quarashi chronology
Kristnihald undir Jökli (2001)	Jinx (2002)	Guerilla Disco (2004)

Singles from Jinx
- 1. "Mr. Jinx" Released: Summer 2002; 2. "Stick 'Em Up" Released: Winter 2002

Professional ratings
Review scores
Source	Rating
Allmusic	2.5/5 stars
Rockzone.com	B
Rolling Stone	2/5 stars

Jinx is the fourth album by Quarashi, and is the only album the group released on a major record label. It was released on 9 April 2002. It was their first album to receive an international release.

== Track listing ==
1. "Stick 'Em Up"
2. "Mr. Jinx"
3. "Baseline"
4. "Malone Lives"
5. "Tarfur"
6. "Copycat"
7. "Transparent Parents"
8. "Weirdo"
9. "Xeneizes"
10. "Fuck You Puto"
11. "Dive In"
12. "Bless"
13. "Into Your Arms" (Japanese release only)
14. "Switchstance" (Japanese release only)
