= Drífa Snædal =

Icelandic trade union leader and politician (born 1973)

President of Icelandic Confederation of Labour
- In office 2018 – August 10, 2022
- President: Guðni Th. Jóhannesson
- Preceded by: Gylfi Arnbjörnsson

Executive director of the Left-Green Movement
- In office 2006–2010
- President: Ólafur Ragnar Grímsson

Personal details
- Born: 5 June 1973 Reykjavík
- Education: Fjölbrautaskólinn in Breiðholt; University of Iceland; Lund University
- Occupation: trade union leader politician

Drífa Snædal (born 5 June 1973) is an Icelandic trade union leader and politician. She was the president of the Icelandic Confederation of Labour (ASÍ) (Icelandic: Alþýðusamband Íslands) 2018, until her resignation on August 10, 2022.

== Biography ==
Drífa was born in Reykjavík but grew up in Hella from the age of four and in Lund in Sweden from the age of six to eleven. In 1993, she graduated from Fjölbrautaskólinn in Breiðholt with a degree in sociology. She graduated as a technical draftsman from the Reykjavík Vocational School in 1998, from the University of Iceland with a business degree in 2003 and with a master's degree in labor market studies with an emphasis on labor law from Lund University in 2012.

Drífa became the director of education and promotion at the Association for Women's Shelters in 2003 and was the executive director of the association from 2004 to 2006. She worked as the executive director of the Left-Green Movement from 2006 to 2010. In 2012, she became the executive director of the Icelandic Trade Union Confederation.
