= Quarashi =

Icelandic rap rock band

- Origin: Reykjavík, Iceland
- Genres: Alternative hip hop; rap rock; nu metal; trip hop
- Years active: 1996–2005; 2016–present
- Labels: Sony; Lax; Pop Músík; Japis; Sproti; Columbia; Time Bomb; Skífan; Dennis
- Members: Hössi Ólafsson; Sölvi Blöndal; Egill Ólafur Thorarensen; Steinar Orri Fjeldsted; Ómar Örn Hauksson
- Website: www.quarashi.net at the Wayback Machine (archived 14 October 2008)

Quarashi is an Icelandic rap rock band from Reykjavík. The group consists of rappers Hössi Ólafsson (later replaced by Egill Olafur Thorarensen), Ómar Örn Hauksson, Steinar Orri Fjeldsted, and Sölvi Blöndal (who also acted as producer, keyboardist, percussionist, drummer and songwriter). For live shows, Quarashi was joined by guitarist Smári "Tarfur" Jósepsson, bassist Gaukur Úlfarsson, and DJ Dice (later replaced by DJ Magic). The group came back together in 2016 and is planning on releasing a new album.

In 2026, for the band's 30th anniversary, they played live in Reykjavík at Laugardalshöll, debuting a new single "Do It Again". Many prior collaborators, including Tarfur, made an onstage appearance.

The group released five studio albums from 1996 to 2005, with an upcoming four-track EP "Days of Strange" set to release in December 2026.

== History ==
On 31 August 2000, Quarashi announced that they had signed with Sony Music Entertainment Incorporated under the Columbia Records label. The deal was to last for six albums, the first of which would be produced in collaboration with Cypress Hill DJ, DJ Muggs, and Brendan O'Brien, who was the recording director for the Red Hot Chili Peppers breakthrough hit album, Blood Sugar Sex Magik, and helped produced three of Rage Against the Machine's hit albums, Evil Empire, The Battle of Los Angeles, and Renegades. Quarashi moved to New York City to begin making their American debut album.

After the recording of the album, Sölvi Blöndal and Hössi Ólafsson produced the soundtrack for the Halldór Laxness play, Kristnihald undir Jökli, which was directed by Bergur Þór Ingólfsson, and ran in the Borgarleikhús in the winter of 2001. The album, released on 22 September 2001, was filled with original music written and produced by Sölvi and Hössi, and was released under the Quarashi name.

Quarashi's first single from their American debut album, "Stick 'Em Up", was released in February 2002. The music video, which was a parody of the film Snatch, was in heavy rotation on MTV2.

On 9 April 2002, Jinx was released in America. Jinx was a collection of five new songs ("Mr. Jinx", "Baseline", "Malone Lives", "Copycat", and "Weirdo") and seven songs from Xeneizes ("Stick 'Em Up", "Tarfur", "Jivin' About", "Xeneizes", "Fuck You Puto", "Dive In" "Bless"). "Stick 'Em Up", "Tarfur", "Jivin' About", "Xeneizes", and "Fuck You Puto" were re-recorded with "Jivin' About" being retitled "Transparent Parents". Only "Dive In" and "Bless" remained unchanged.

Jinx received mixed reviews. Some critics loved the group's eclectic mix of rap, rock, and funk, while others saw the group as imitative of other, more successful rap/rock acts such as the Beastie Boys and Limp Bizkit. Despite "Stick 'Em Up" receiving heavy rotation on rock radio stations and MTV2, and reaching Number 27 on the Billboard Modern Rock Tracks chart, and despite Jinx receiving praise from several critics, Jinx débuted at Number 104 on the Billboard 200 albums chart, and then fell 40 spots to Number 144 one week later. Jinx never cracked the Top 40.

Quarashi encountered some problems during their time at Columbia Records. For one, complications in their contract delayed the release of Jinx. Originally scheduled for release in January 2001, the album was finally released in April 2002.

Quarashi were a part of ad campaigns for MTV2 and Levi's Low Rising Jeans. Spin Magazine named Quarashi one of the "Bands To Watch" in 2002. The singles from Jinx, "Stick 'Em Up" and "Mr. Jinx", have been used as background music in several film trailers and TV shows such as 2 Fast 2 Furious, Alias, Smallville and commercials for the NBA on TNT. Some of the songs from Jinx have appeared in several video games including Amplitude, NFL Blitz 2002, and Transworld Snowboarding, while "Mr. Jinx" was a part of the soundtrack for the best selling Madden NFL 2003 video game. The music video for "Mr. Jinx" was in regular rotation on MTV, MTV2, and MuchMusic (now Fuse TV), and was voted as the MTV Viewers Pick for the week of 20 September 2002, although the video would be shown on the three music video channels for about 3 months, and then was never shown on any of those channels ever again. "Stick 'Em Up" was nominated for a 2002 MTV Video Music Award for Best Art Direction (which they lost to Coldplay's "Trouble"). And perhaps most importantly, Quarashi was a part of the Vans Warped Tour in the summer of 2002, which featured NOFX, Good Charlotte, and the Mighty Mighty Bosstones.

After the Vans Warped Tour ended, Quarashi toured Japan, Australia and Europe.

After spending the summer and fall of 2002 performing around the world, Quarashi took a break in Reykjavík. In the end, Jinx ended up selling a little more than 100,000 copies in America.

=== Hössi leaves (2003) ===
Just before Christmas 2002, Hössi Ólafsson left the group to study at the University of Iceland. Quarashi produced "Mess It Up" in July 2003, a song which featured Steini trading verses with underground Icelandic rapper Opee (real name Ólafur Páll). The song was released only in Iceland, and was a hit, reaching Number 1 on the Icelandic Mainstream and Alternative Singles charts, and winning the Icelandic EFFEMM Award for 2003 Song Of The Year, and the EDDA Award for 2003 Video Of The Year. Opee did one more song with Quarashi, "Orð Morð" featuring Icelandic musician Jóhann G. Jóhannsson. Opee performed with Quarashi at Menningarnótt (Culture Night) in Reykjavík in August 2003 and also performed with Quarashi at the CMJ New Music Festival at Tobacco Road in New York City on 23 October 2003.

=== Tiny (2003–2004) ===
On 13 November 2003, Quarashi released a new song exclusively in Iceland, entitled "Race City". The rapper on the song, Egill Olafur Thorarensen, was nicknamed "Tiny". "Race City" reached Number 1 on the Icelandic Alternative Singles chart. Quarashi started an on-line blog in December 2003, to discuss the recording process and to announce upcoming dates. Tiny's first live performance with Quarashi occurred on 20 December 2003 at the club NASA in Reykjavík.

Quarashi travelled to Japan once again to perform at the two-day Sonicmania concert in Tokyo in January 2004, and then returned to Iceland to perform "Race City" at the 2004 EFFEMM Awards in February. Quarashi also performed during a long weekend in Iceland called "The Verslunarmanna Helgi", where they played gigs at Sauðárkrókur and Akureyri. Quarashi was the opening act for both 50 Cent and the Prodigy in Iceland.

On 24 February 2004, Columbia Records announced that they had dropped Quarashi from the label due to the disappointing sales of Jinx. Quarashi was also released from their EMI Publishing contract.

In April 2004, Quarashi began recording their next album, their first one with Tiny, under the working title of Payback. In June, Quarashi posted on their blog the first single off their new album: "Stun Gun".

=== Guerilla Disco (2004–05) ===
On 14 October 2004, Quarashi released Guerilla Disco in Iceland under the Skífan and Dennis Records labels. The album was met with mostly positive reviews, as fans embraced the new sound and style. Guerilla Disco was another hit album for Quarashi in Iceland.

Also in October 2004, Quarashi teamed up with the stars of the popular Popptíví (the MTV of Iceland) TV show, 70 Minutes, to make a song and music video called "Crazy Bastard". The video was a parody of several pop, rap, and rock acts like Britney Spears, and featured the stars of 70 Minutes rapping, with Omar and Tiny playing hype men. The song and video became a fan favourite, and when more copies of Guerilla Disco were made, "Crazy Bastard" was added as a bonus track on the CD.

On 3 March 2005, Quarashi released Guerilla Disco in Japan, through Sony Japan. The album became a huge hit, on the strength of the single "Payback". The album, slightly changed for the Japanese release, peaked at Number 2 on the Japan International Top 40 chart, selling 30,000 copies in its first month of release.

=== Breakup (2005) ===
Quarashi's final concert was on 15 April 2005, in Akureyri, Iceland. On 5 August 2005, Sölvi Blöndal did an interview in the Fréttablaðið where he announced that Quarashi had broken up.

Quarashi agreed to perform a one-off gig on 9 July 2011 at the Best Festival (Besta hátíðin). After the final concerts, Quarashi released the greatest hits album Anthology.

=== New album (2016) ===
In May 2016, during an interview on Icelandic television station RÚV, Sölvi and Steini confirmed that a new album was in the works that would include all five original members. Quarashi also released a new song and video with all five members called "Chicago".

=== Greatest Tricks (2021) ===
On 9 August 2021, the group announced on their Facebook page the release of a Limited Box Set titled "Greatest Tricks" to be released in December 2021. According to the comments made by the band on the announcement, the box set contains previously unreleased material. However, on 17 September 2021, when the pre-order for the boxset was released, it was revealed that the boxset does not contain any previously unreleased songs. "Greatest Tricks" vinyl version is essentially the first disc of Anthology, with two additional previously released songs "Rock On" and "Chicago", which were released in 2014 and 2016. The CD version does not include the songs "Pro", "Race City", or "Dive In". The box set includes double colored vinyl, CD, and cassette versions of the collection, along with stickers, key chains, tote bag, and a finger skateboard (finger-board).

=== New Material / "Wanna Snippet?" (2022) ===
On 25 July, the band posted on their Facebook page that they were working on new material. The post read: "Wanna snippet from a new song? 1000 likes and 300 comments and you'll have it". Despite the post not reaching the goal, several weeks later the band posted a video clip which contained a still image of the band with a red spray paint filter over it. The video also contained a few seconds of an audio clip of the new song. The clip was all Hössi singing what is presumably the chorus to the upcoming song. The clip did not contain any rapping by any of the members. However, a few days after posting the clip, the band removed the post. Though the previous "Wanna snippet" post still is on their page.

== Members ==
The final Quarashi line-up was as follows:

- Egill Olafur Thorarensen a.k.a. Tiny
- Ómar Örn Hauksson a.k.a. Ómar Swarez
- Steinar Orri Fjeldsted a.k.a. Steini a.k.a. Stoney
- Sölvi Blöndal

This was the group's lineup from 2003 until their breakup in 2005. Hössi Ólafsson founded the group with Sölvi and Steini in 1996, and served as the lead vocalist and frontman, but left in 2002. Egill Olafur Thorarensen replaced Hössi as a member of the group in 2003.

Frequent contributors to the band included:

- Gísli Galdur Thorgeirsson a.k.a. DJ Magic – DJ
- Bjössi Ingimundarson a.k.a. DJ Dice – DJ
- Gaukur Úlfarsson – Bass
- Smári "Tarfur" Jósepsson – Guitar
- Hrannar Ingimarsson – Guitar and Keyboard. Also mixer for the band.
- Magga Stína Blöndal – Vocals
- Vidar Hákon Gislason – Bass and guitar
- Richard Oddur Hauksson – DJ

== Discography ==
=== Albums ===
- Quarashi (1997), Lax Records/Pop Músík
- Xeneizes (1999), Japis
- Kristnihald undir Jökli (2001), Sproti
- Jinx (2002), Columbia/Time Bomb
- Guerilla Disco (2004–05), Skífan/Dennis Records/Sony Japan

=== Compilation albums ===
- Anthology (2011), Laxmenn Ehf
- Greatest Tricks (2021)

=== EPs ===
- Switchstance (1996), Lax Records

=== Singles ===
Year	Title	Chart positions					Album
Year	Title	US Hot 100	US Modern Rock	US Hot Hip Hop	US Hot Dance	UK	Album
1996	"Switchstance"	-	-	-	-	-	Switchstance
1997	"Thunderball"	-	-	-	-	-	Quarashi
1997	"Catch 22"	-	-	-	-	-	Quarashi
1999	"Stick 'Em Up" (featuring Omar Swarez)	-	-	-	-	-	Xeneizes
1999	"Surreal Rhyme"	-	-	-	-	-	Xeneizes
2002	"Stick 'Em Up"	-	27	-	-	-	Jinx
2002	"Mr. Jinx"	-	43	-	-	-	Jinx
2003	"Mess It Up" (featuring Opee)	-	-	-	-	-	-
2003	"Race City"	-	-	-	-	-	-
2004	"Stun Gun"	-	-	-	-	-	Guerilla Disco
2004	"Stars"	-	-	-	-	-	Guerilla Disco
2004	"Straight Jacket"	-	-	-	-	-	Guerilla Disco
2005	"Payback"	-	-	-	-	-	Guerilla Disco
2011	"Beat 'Em"	-	-	-	-	-	Anthology
2014	"Rock On"	-	-	-	-	-	
2016	"Chicago"	-	-	-	-	-	

=== Music videos ===
- "Baseline"
- "Chicago"
- "Crazy Bastard"
- "Malone Lives"
- "Mess It Up"
- "Mr. Jinx"
- "Orð Morð"
- "Payback"
- "Race City"
- "Rock On"
- "Stars"
- "Stick Em Up"
- "Stun Gun"
- "Surreal Rhyme"
- "Switchstance"
- "Weirdo"
- "Catch 22"
