= Yohanna =

Icelandic-Danish singer (born 1990)

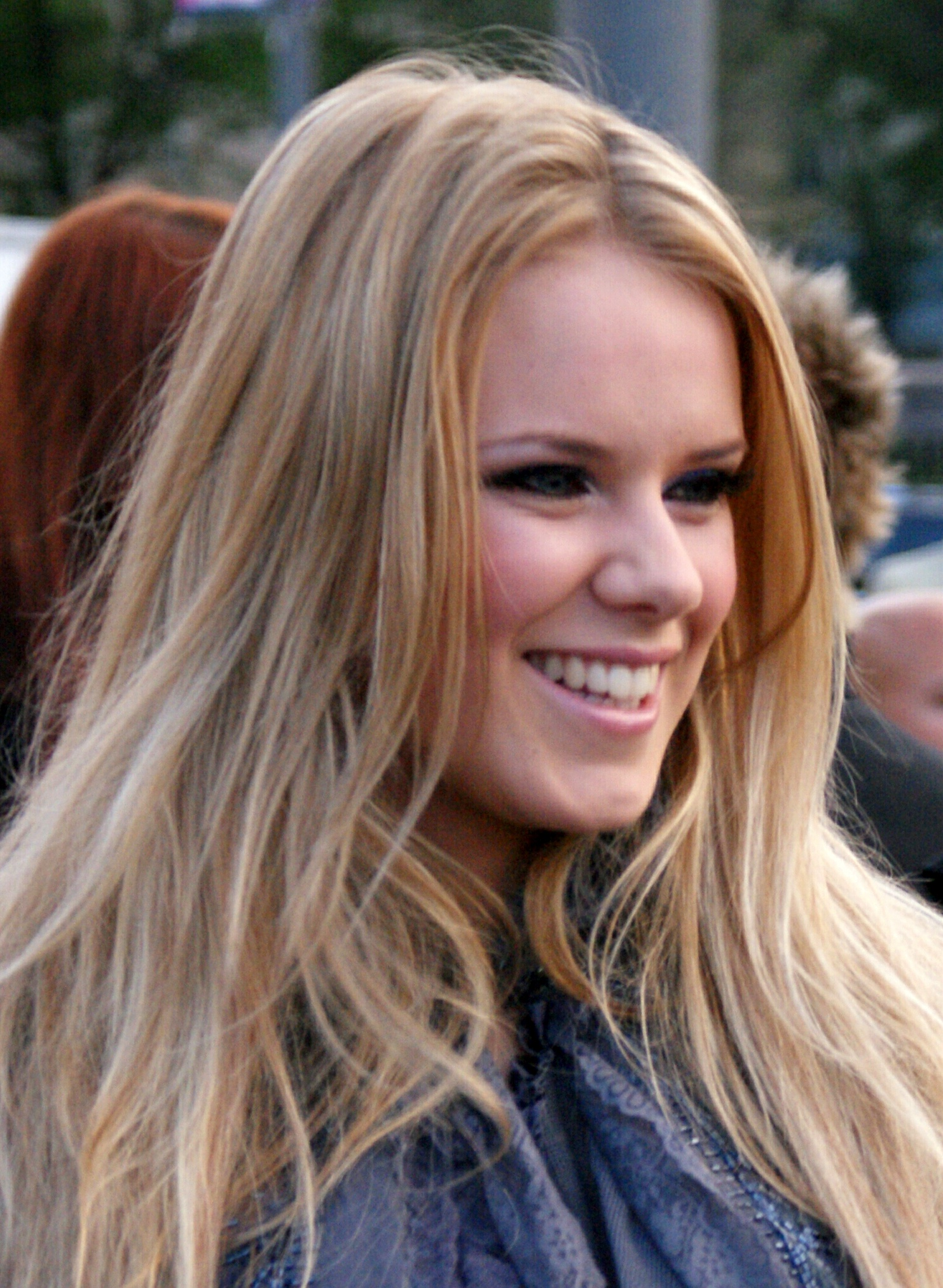
- Yohanna in Moscow in 2009
- Born: Jóhanna Guðrún Jónsdóttir; 16 October 1990 (age 35); Copenhagen, Denmark
- Other names: Jóhanna; Jóhanna Guðrún
- Children: 3
- Musical career
- Origin: Hafnarfjörður, Iceland
- Genres: Pop; soft rock
- Occupation: Singer
- Instrument: Vocals
- Years active: 2000–present
- Labels: Hljóðsmiðjan; Warner Music Sweden

Jóhanna Guðrún Jónsdóttir (born 16 October 1990), known outside Iceland as Yohanna, is an Icelandic singer. Beginning her music career as a child singer, Yohanna received international recognition after representing Iceland in the Eurovision Song Contest 2009 with the song "Is It True?", placing as the runner-up. This tied for the best result Iceland had ever achieved in the contest. Following the success at Eurovision, she released the studio album Butterflies and Elvis (2009).

Following Eurovision 2009, Yohanna has since attempted to represent Iceland again on two occasions. In 2011, she reached the finals of Söngvakeppni Sjónvarpsins 2011 with the song "Nótt", and later won the OGAE Second Chance Contest 2011 as well, while she failed to reach the finals in Söngvakeppnin 2013 with the song "Þú".

== Early life ==
Yohanna was born in Copenhagen to Icelandic parents Jón Sverrir Sverrison, an electrical engineer, and Margrét Steinþórsdóttir, a nurse. When she was two years old, the family returned to Iceland and settled in Reykjavík. They resided in Reykjavík for six years until moving to the nearby town of Hafnarfjörður. She began performing at age nine, when she started singing lessons.

== Career ==
=== 2000–2001: Career beginnings ===
Yohanna began her music career in 2000, at the age of nine, after signing with Icelandic record label Hljóðsmiðjan. As a child singer, she released two studio albums: Jóhanna Guðrún 9 in 2000, and Ég sjálf in 2001. The two albums contained mainly covers of international pop songs sung in the Icelandic language, such as "Torn", "Genie in a Bottle", and "I'll Be There". After the release of the latter album, Yohanna released a Christmas album in 2002, titled Jól með Jóhönnu, before stepping away from the music industry and public eye.

=== 2008–2013: Eurovision and Butterflies and Elvis ===
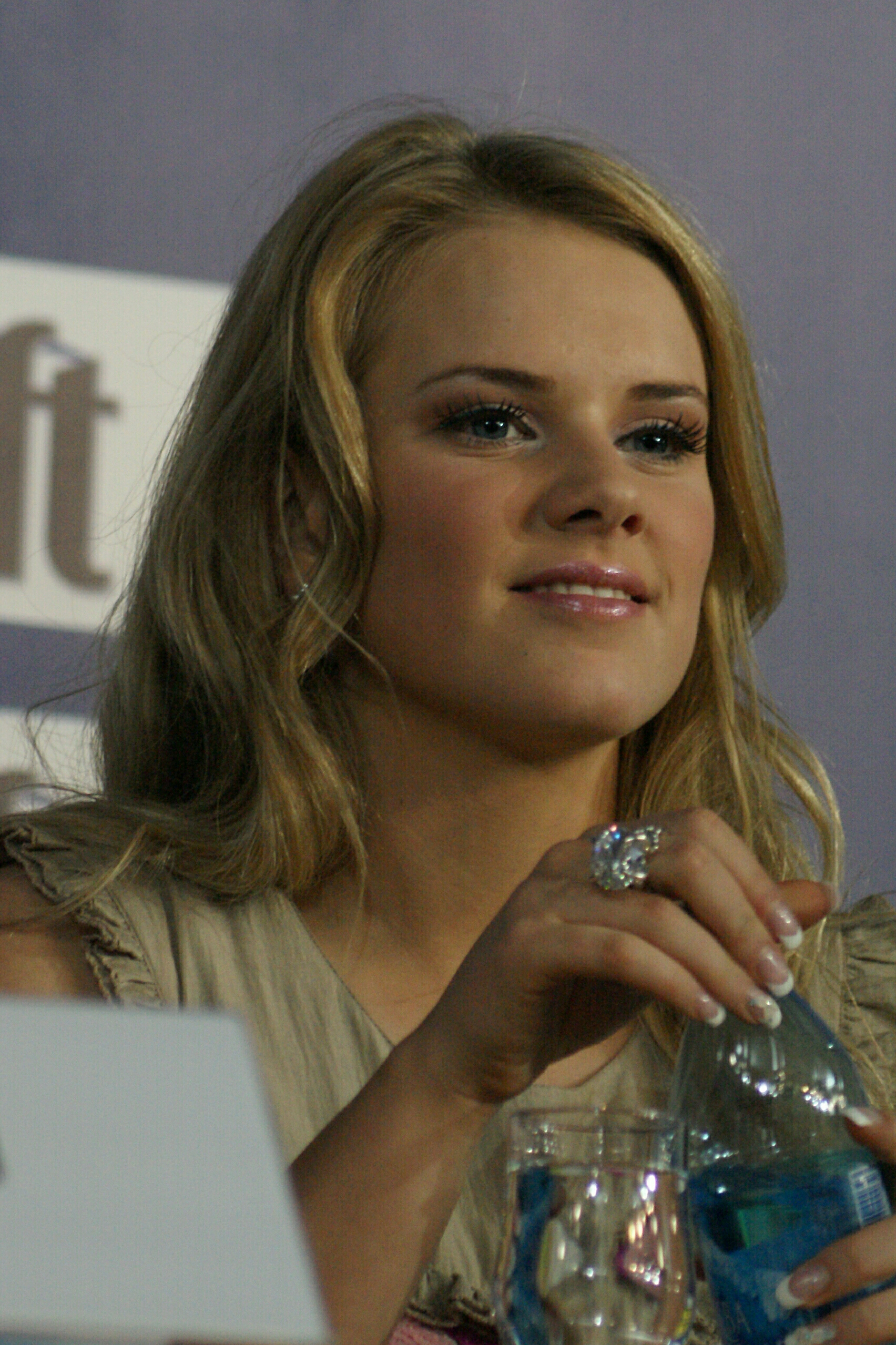
Yohanna in 2009 in Moscow, during a press conference for the Eurovision Song Contest 2009.

After a six-year break from the music industry, Yohanna returned to the public eye after being confirmed as a competitor in Söngvakeppni Sjónvarpsins 2009, the Icelandic national final for the Eurovision Song Contest 2009, in November 2008. She competed with the song Is It True?", composed by Óskar Páll Sveinsson. Yohanna advanced from the first semi-final on 10 January 2009, and ultimately won the final on 14 February. After winning Söngvakeppni Sjónvarpsins, Yohanna received the right to represent Iceland at the Eurovision Song Contest 2009, held in Moscow. In the lead-up to the competition, Yohanna went on a promotional tour around Europe to promote the song, additionally performing at the UKeurovision Preview Party in London and the Eurovision Promo Concert in Amsterdam.

Yohanna ultimately competed in the first semi-final of the Eurovision Song Contest on 12 May 2009. She won the semi-final and qualified to the final after receiving 174 points, including the maximum number of 12 points from seven of the participating countries. This was the best result Iceland had ever received in a Eurovision semi-final. After qualifying to the final, Yohanna placed second, receiving 218 points, behind only Alexander Rybak of Norway and the song "Fairytale". Her second place finish in the final tied for the best result Iceland had ever received in the competition; the only other time Iceland had finished this high was in the Eurovision Song Contest 1999, when Selma Björnsdóttir placed second with the song "All Out of Luck". "Is It True?" subsequently charted throughout Europe, becoming a number-one hit in Iceland, and also reaching the top ten in Finland, Norway, Sweden, and Switzerland, the top forty in Belgium, Denmark, and Ireland, in addition to charting in the United Kingdom.

Following her success in Eurovision, Yohanna signed with Warner Music Sweden and began work on her fourth studio album, her first album as an adult. The album, Butterflies and Elvis, was later released internationally in July 2009, where it peaked in the top twenty in Sweden. The album also produced the single "I Miss You", which became a top twenty hit in Iceland. Yohanna has since attempted to return to Eurovision on two separate occasions. In 2011, she competed in Söngvakeppni Sjónvarpsins 2011 with the song "Nótt", where she advanced to the finals but did not win. She subsequently was selected to represent Iceland in the OGAE Second Chance Contest 2011, where the local OGAE affiliates each select a song that competed in their country's national selection but did not win, and ended up winning the competition. She later returned in Söngvakeppnin 2013 with the song "Þú", but was eliminated in the semi-final. Yohanna achieved her second number-one single in Iceland in 2013, performing the song "Mamma þarf að djamma" with Baggalútur.

== Personal life ==
Yohanna resided in Iceland until 2012, when she moved to the city of Kongsvinger in Norway in order to be closer to the European continent. She has since returned to Iceland. Yohanna married Icelandic musician Davíð Sigurgeirsson in 2018; they have two children together, a daughter born in 2015, and a son born in 2019. Davíð previously had written Yohanna's 2013 single "Þú".

== Discography ==
=== Studio albums ===
Title	Album details	Peak chart positions
Title	Album details	SWE
Jóhanna Guðrún 9	Released: 2000; Label: Hljóðsmiðjan; Format: CD	—
Ég sjálf	Released: 2001; Label: Hljóðsmiðjan; Format: CD	—
Jól með Jóhönnu	Released: 2002; Label: Hljóðsmiðjan; Format: CD	—
Butterflies and Elvis	Released: 20 July 2009; Label: Warner Music Sweden; Format: CD, digital download	19
Jól með Jóhönnu	Released: 19 November 2020; Label: Alda Music; Format: CD, Vinyl, Download	—
Óskalögin mín	Released: September 2023; Label: Alda Music; Format: Download	—
Föstudagslögin (Vol 2) (with Halldór Gunnar)	Scheduled: 5 April 2024; Label: HGP Music; Format: Download	—

=== Singles ===
Year	Single	Peak chart positions									Album
Year	Single	ICE	BEL (Vl)	DEN	FIN	IRE	NOR	SWE	SWI	UK	Album
2009	"Is It True?"	1	23	16	4	28	3	2	9	49	Butterflies and Elvis
2009	"I Miss You"	18	—	—	—	—	—	—	—	—	Butterflies and Elvis
2011	"Nótt" / "Slow Down"	3	—	—	—	—	—	—	—	—	Non-album singles
2011	"I Think of Angels"	—	—	—	—	—	—	—	—	—	Non-album singles
2011	"Really Over"	—	—	—	—	—	—	—	—	—	Non-album singles
2012	"Indian Rope Trick"	—	—	—	—	—	—	—	—	—	Butterflies and Elvis
2012	"Coming Home"	—	—	—	—	—	—	—	—	—	Non-album singles
2013	"Þú"	—	—	—	—	—	—	—	—	—	Non-album singles
2013	"Mamma þarf að djamma" (with Baggalútur)	1	—	—	—	—	—	—	—	—	Non-album singles
2015	"Find a Better Man" (with ROK)	—	—	—	—	—	—	—	—	—	Non-album singles
2016	"Revolving Doors"	—	—	—	—	—	—	—	—	—	Non-album singles
2020	"Löngu liðnir dagar"	—	—	—	—	—	—	—	—	—	Jól með Jóhönnu
2021	"Ætla ekki að eyða þeim ein"	—	—	—	—	—	—	—	—	—	n/a
2022	"Jólin koma alltaf"	—	—	—	—	—	—	—	—	—	n/a
2023	"Best í heimi" (with Margrét Lilja)	—	—	—	—	—	—	—	—	—	Óskalögin mín
2024	"Töfrar"	—	—	—	—	—	—	—	—	—	TBA
2024	"Skiptir engu máli" (with Sverrir Bergmann)	—	—	—	—	—	—	—	—	—	TBA
2025	"Þú ert nú meiri "	—	—	—	—	—	—	—	—	—	TBA

Preceded by Euroband with "This Is My Life"	Iceland in the Eurovision Song Contest; 2009	Succeeded by Hera Björk with "Je ne sais quoi"
Preceded by (Sweden) Timoteij	OGAE Second Chance Contest winner 2011	Succeeded by (Spain) Pastora Soler
