= Iceland in the Eurovision Song Contest 2020 =

- Eurovision Song Contest 2020
- Participating broadcaster: Ríkisútvarpið (RÚV)
- Country: Iceland
- Selection process: Söngvakeppnin 2020
- Selection date: 29 February 2020

Competing entry
- Song: "Think About Things"
- Artist: Daði og Gagnamagnið
- Songwriters: Daði Freyr Pétursson

Placement
- Final result: Contest cancelled

Participation chronology

Iceland was set to be represented at the Eurovision Song Contest 2020, which was scheduled to be held in Rotterdam, Netherlands. Icelandic broadcaster Ríkisútvarpið (RÚV) held a televised selection process, Söngvakeppnin 2020, to choose its entry for the contest. Following two semi-finals and a final, "Think About Things", written by Daði Freyr Pétursson and performed by Daði og Gagnamagnið, emerged as the winner of the event in February 2020. In mid-March 2020, due to the spread across Europe of the coronavirus disease 2019 (COVID-19), the European Broadcasting Union (EBU) announced the contest's cancellation; six months later, RÚV announced that Daði og Gagnamagnið would instead represent Iceland in the 2021 contest.

During Söngvakeppnin 2020 and following its selection as Iceland's entry, "Think About Things" went on to become a viral phenomenon and was considered one of the favourites to win the contest before the cancellation. It went on to win several alternative contests, held by national broadcasters in place of Eurovision to determine their public's favourite song, including Austria's Der kleine Song Contest and Sweden's Sveriges 12:a.

== Background ==
Prior to the 2020 contest, Iceland had participated in the Eurovision Song Contest 32 times following its first entry in 1986 and had failed to participate on only two occasions since their debut. The contest has been broadcast in Iceland since as early as 1970, but the geographically-remote nation was prevented from competing until a stable satellite connection could be established to enable live transmission of it. Iceland had never won the contest ahead of the 2020 event, but had previously achieved two second place finishes, in 1999 with the song "All Out of Luck" performed by Selma and in 2009 with the song "Is It True?" performed by Yohanna. Following the introduction of semi-finals for the 2004 contest, Iceland's entries appeared in the final on nine occasions. In 2018, Iceland marked their fourth consecutive non-qualification when Ari Ólafsson and the song "Our Choice" placed 19th and last in the first semi-final, standing as the country's worst result at the contest. Iceland made its returned to the final in 2019, with Hatari and the song "Hatrið mun sigra" placing 10th with 232 points and bringing the nation back into the top 10 for the first time since 2009.

The Icelandic national broadcaster, Ríkisútvarpið (RÚV), broadcasts the event within Iceland and organises the selection process for the nation's entry. The Icelandic broadcaster has used various methods to select the Icelandic entry in the past, such as internal selections and televised national finals to choose the performer and song to compete at Eurovision. Since 2006 RÚV has chosen its entry for Eurovision through Söngvakeppnin, a televised music competition. RÚV confirmed its intention to participate at the 2020 contest on 13 September 2019 through a post on the official Söngvakeppnin Facebook page, and concurrently affirmed details for the production of Söngvakeppnin 2020 to select its entry as well as opening the song submission process.

== Before Eurovision ==
=== Söngvakeppnin 2020 ===
RÚV once again organised Söngvakeppnin ("The Singing Competition") to determine the Icelandic entry for the Eurovision Song Contest. The competition consisted of three shows held in the Icelandic capital Reykjavík, with two semi-finals held in the Háskólabíó on 8 and 15 February 2020 and the final held in the Laugardalshöll on 29 February. All three shows were broadcast on RÚV and online at the broadcaster's official website ruv.is and were hosted by Björg Magnúsdóttir, Benedikt Valsson and Fannar Sveinsson.

The 2020 contest was announced on 13 September 2019 and until 17 October, interested artists and songwriters were invited to submit entries for the contest through the Söngvakeppnin website. Alongside this open submission process RÚV also held discussions with experienced Icelandic songwriters inviting them to write entries for the competition. Each composer could submit up to two songs for consideration, while lyricists could be credited on an unlimited number of songs. A total of 157 songs were subsequently registered for the competition, 25 more than those entered for the previous contest; a seven-member panel consisting of individuals from the Icelandic Society of Authors and Composers (Icelandic: Félag tónskálda og textahöfunda; FTT) and the Icelandic Musicians' Union (Félag íslenskra hljómlistarmanna; FÍH) was tasked with selecting ten songs to compete in the semi-finals. In addition to winning the right to represent Iceland at the Eurovision Song Contest, any authors of the winning song received a prize of ISK 1,000,000.

Ahead of the contest, it was reported that RÚV had signed a sponsorship deal with American streaming platform Netflix worth ISK 10,000,000, which would contribute to Söngvakeppnin 2020. This was part of Netflix's ambitions to grow in the Nordics region and RÚV's plans to improve its media operations, as well as to better compete with international content providers. This agreement was reported soon after the conclusion of filming for Netflix's Eurovision-themed film Eurovision Song Contest: The Story of Fire Saga (2020), which was filmed in the town of Húsavík and other parts of Iceland.

==== Competing entries ====
The 10 competing artists and songs were revealed by RÚV on 18 January 2020, and were presented for the first time the same day through the special programme Kynningarþáttur Söngvakeppninnar ("Introductory Episode of the Song Competition"). The songs were initially leaked on Spotify a number of hours before the official presentation on RÚV, which inadvertently revealed the artists competing in the event. Per the rules of the contest, all entries were required to be performed in Icelandic in the semi-finals, with artists being given a free choice on language should their song reach the final.

Several of the competing artists had participated in previous editions of Söngvakeppnin: in addition to competing in the 2006, 2007, 2010 and 2011 editions of the contest, Matti Matt was also a member of the group Sjonni's Friends that represented Iceland at the Eurovision Song Contest 2011, where they placed 20th; Daði Freyr had previously competed in Söngvakeppnin 2017, where he placed second behind Svala; and Elísabet had participated in Söngvakeppnin 2016, where she qualified for the final and placed 6th.

Söngvakeppnin 2020 – Competing entries
Artist	Song		Songwriter(s)
Artist	Icelandic title	English title	Songwriter(s)
Brynja Mary	"Augun þín"	"In Your Eyes"	Brynja Mary Sverrisdóttir, Lasse Qvist, Kristján Hreinsson
Daði og Gagnamagnið	"Gagnamagnið"	"Think About Things"	Daði Freyr Pétursson
Dimma	"Almyrkvi"	—N/a	Dimma, Ingó Geirdal
Elísabet	"Elta þig"	"Haunting"	Elísabet Ormslev, Zoe Ruth Erwin, Daði Freyr Pétursson
Hildur Vala	"Fellibylur"	—N/a	Hildur Vala Einarsdóttir, Jón Ólafsson, Bragi Valdimar Skúlason
Ísold and Helga	"Klukkan tifar"	"Meet Me Halfway"	Birgir Steinn Stefánsson, Ragnar Már Jónsson, Stefán Hilmarsson
Iva	"Oculis Videre"		Iva Marín Adrichem, Richard Cameron
Kid Isak	"Ævintýri"	—N/a	Þormóður Eiríksson, Kristinn Óli Haraldsson, Jóhannes Damian Patreksson
Matti Matt	"Dreyma"	—N/a	Birgir Steinn Stefánsson, Ragnar Már Jónsson, Matthías Matthíasson
Nína	"Ekkó"	"Echo"	Þórhallur Halldórsson, Sanna Martinez, Einar Bárðarson, Christoph Baer, Donal Ryan

==== Shows ====
===== Semi-finals =====
Two semi-finals took place on 8 and 15 February 2020. In each semi-final five of the ten competing acts performed and two entries determined solely by the viewing public through telephone voting progressed to the final. Per the rules of the competition an additional optional qualifier could be selected by the contest organisers from among the non-qualifying acts, which would also progress to the final. This option was subsequently invoked by the organisers, meaning that a total of five acts qualified for the final.

A number of guest performances also featured during the two shows. The first semi-final featured performances by GDRN and 2003 Icelandic Eurovision entrant Birgitta Haukdal and an appearance by Icelandic actress Katrín Halldóra. The second semi-final featured performances by Flóni, who performed a rendition of the 1991 Icelandic Eurovision entry "Draumur um Nínu", and Elín Ey, who performed the 1974 Eurovision winning entry "Waterloo".

Semi-final 1 – 8 February 2020
R/O	Artist	Song	Votes	Place	Result
1	Kid Isak	"Ævintýri"	3,651	3	—N/a
2	Elísabet	"Elta þig"	1,989	5	—N/a
3	Brynja Mary	"Augun þín"	3,374	4	—N/a
4	Ísold and Helga	"Klukkan tifar"	6,654	2	Finalist
5	Dimma	"Almyrkvi"	14,984	1	Finalist

Semi-final 2 – 15 February 2020
R/O	Artist	Song	Votes	Place	Result
1	Daði og Gagnamagnið	"Gagnamagnið"	11,218	1	Finalist
2	Hildur Vala	"Fellibylur"	1,336	5	—N/a
3	Iva	"Oculis Videre"	10,924	2	Finalist
4	Nína	"Ekkó"	5,905	3	Wildcard
5	Matti Matt	"Dreyma"	5,634	4	—N/a

===== Final =====
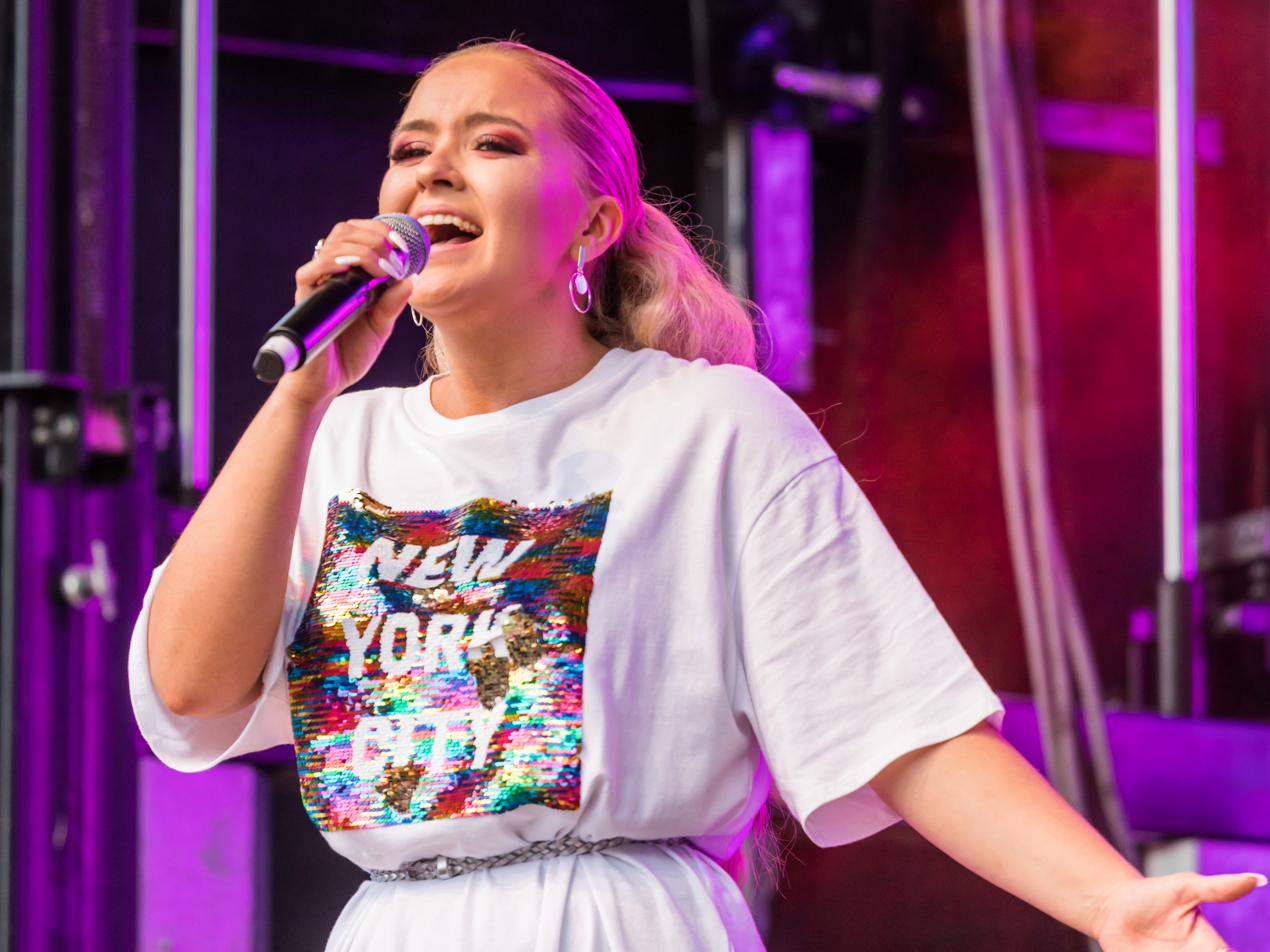
Alexandra Rotan, who represented Norway at Eurovision 2019 as a member of Keiino, was part of the Söngvakeppnin 2020 international jury.

The Söngvakeppnin 2020 final took place on 29 February 2020 and featured the five qualifiers from the semi-finals. In the final artists had a free choice in which language they could perform; three of the qualifiers subsequently performed their entries in English. "Oculis Videre" by Iva was originally scheduled to be performed in English, however the authors subsequently requested that the Icelandic version be featured in the final instead, a change which was subsequently approved by the contest organisers.

Two rounds of voting determined the winning song: in the first round, the votes of the viewing public through telephone voting and the votes of a 10-member international jury panel determined two entries which would progress to the second round. The public and jury each accounted for 50% of the result in the first round, with the rankings of each jury member being added to the number of televotes cast by the public. In the second round a further round of televoting was held, with the winner determined by aggregating the results of the first round to the votes received in the second round. Following both rounds of the competition, "Think About Things" performed by Daði og Gagnamagnið emerged the winner of Söngvakeppnin 2020 and was selected as Iceland's entry for the Eurovision Song Contest 2020. The full results of the semi-finals and the full breakdown of jury and televoting results in the final were revealed on 2 March 2020.

A number of guests performances also featured during the show. Stjórnin, who represented Iceland in the Eurovision Song Contest 1990, performed their Eurovision song "Eitt lag enn" to mark 30 years since its first performance. The reigning Söngvakeppnin champions Hatari, and 2019 Norwegian Eurovision entrants Keiino also performed during the show, with Hatari reprising their Eurovision entry "Hatrið mun sigra" with a children’s choir and Keiino performing their latest single "Black Leather".

Final – First Round – 29 February 2020
R/O	Artist	Song	Jury	Public	Total	Place	Result
1	Ísold and Helga	"Meet Me Halfway"	17,170	5,568	22,738	4	—N/a
2	Daði og Gagnamagnið	"Think About Things"	24,289	36,035	60,324	1	Advanced
3	Nína	"Echo"	15,286	6,515	21,801	5	—N/a
4	Iva	"Oculis Videre"	18,426	19,072	37,498	3	—N/a
5	Dimma	"Almyrkvi"	14,867	22,848	37,715	2	Advanced

Jury members (sorted by country)
- Albania: Kleart Duraj
- Denmark: Christina Schilling
- Greece: Eirini Giannara
- Iceland: Klemens Nikulásson Hannigan
- Iceland: Regína Ósk Óskarsdóttir
- Iceland: Unnsteinn Manuel Stefánsson
- Lithuania: Audrius Giržadas
- Norway: Alexandra Rotan
- Spain: Ana María Bordas
- Sweden: Edward af Sillén

Detailed Jury Votes
Song	Juror										Total
Song	1	2	3	4	5	6	7	8	9	10	Total
"Meet Me Halfway"	2,512	2,093	1,466	1,676	1,676	1,676	1,466	1,256	1,676	1,676	17,170
"Think About Things"	2,093	2,512	2,512	2,512	2,512	2,512	2,093	2,512	2,512	2,512	24,289
"Echo"	1,676	1,256	1,256	1,466	1,466	1,256	1,256	2,093	1,466	2,093	15,286
"Oculis Videre"	1,466	1,676	2,093	2,093	2,093	2,093	2,512	1,676	1,256	1,466	18,426
"Almyrkvi"	1,256	1,466	1,676	1,256	1,256	1,466	1,676	1,466	2,093	1,256	14,867

Final – Second Round
R/O	Artist	Song	Votes			Place
R/O	Artist	Song	First Round	Second Round	Total	Place
1	Daði og Gagnamagnið	"Think About Things"	60,324	58,319	118,643	1
2	Dimma	"Almyrkvi"	37,715	42,468	80,183	2

=== Promotion ===
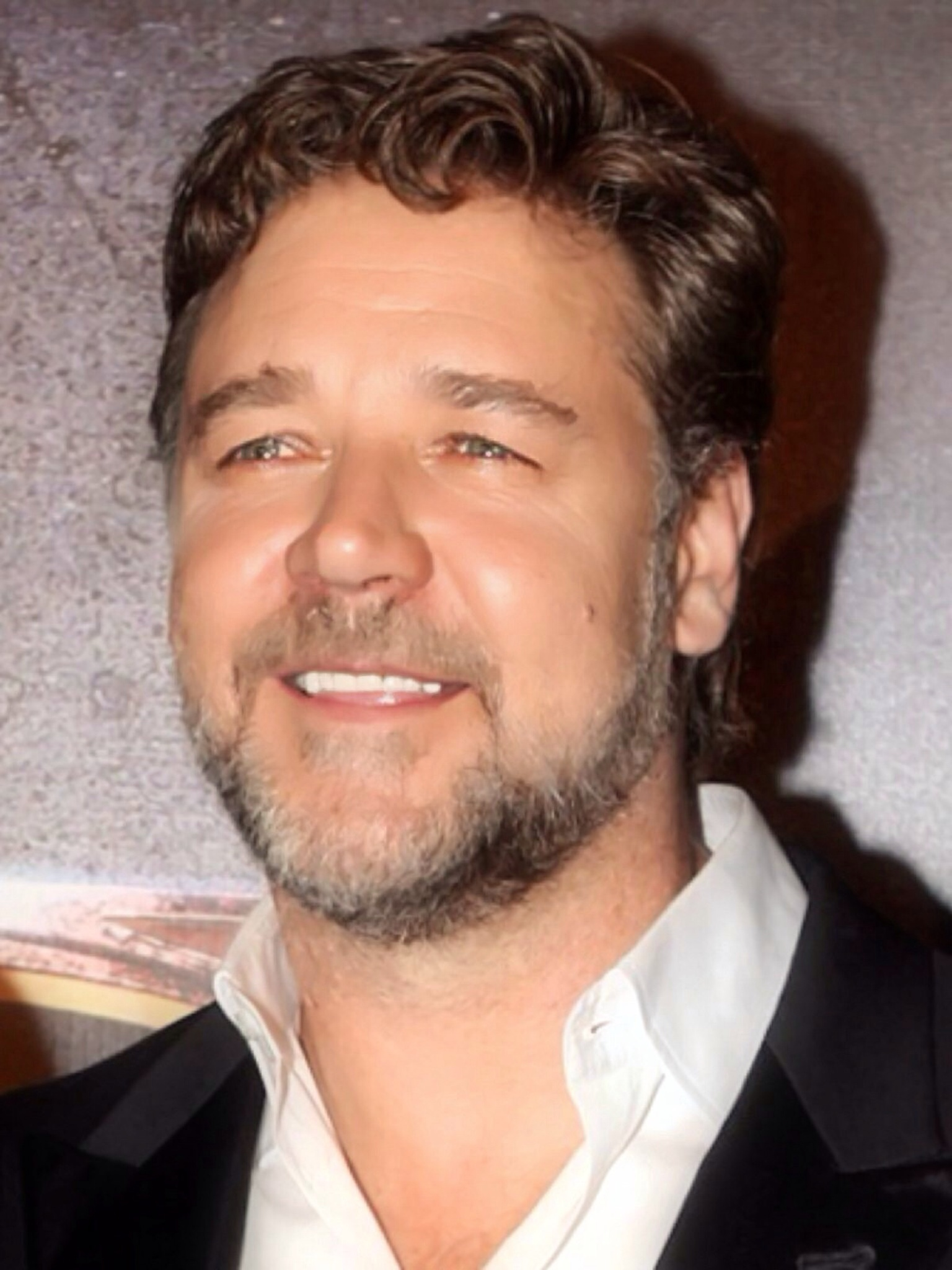
Academy Award-winning actor Russell Crowe showed his support for Daði og Gagnamagnið when he tweeted about their entry with just the word "Song."

Shortly after Daði og Gagnamagnið's victory in Söngvakeppnin 2020, Iceland quickly became one of the favourites to win the contest according to bookmakers. Even before the final of Söngvakeppnin however, "Think About Things" gained great attention online and became a viral phenomenon following the release of the song's music video ahead of the contest's second semi-final. Following their performance at the Söngvakeppnin semi-final, the track and performance gained traction online, and was shared on Twitter by several well-known personalities, including UK television presenters Rylan Clark-Neal and India Willoughby, and German journalist Stefan Niggemeier and satirist Jan Böhmermann. The song also gained the attention of Irish comedian Dara Ó Briain and New Zealand Academy Award-winning actor Russell Crowe, the latter who tweeted his support for the group with simply the word "Song."

Before the contest each year, many Eurovision fan clubs host events with some of the participating acts from that year's event. The Swedish branch of OGAE held its event, Melfest WKND 2020 on 6 March 2020, which featured Daði og Gagnamagnið alongside a number of other acts confirmed for the 2020 contest. However, several other pre-events, including Israel Calling in Tel Aviv, the PrePartyES in Madrid and the Eurovision in Concert in Amsterdam were subsequently cancelled or postponed indefinitely in March 2020 due to the rising severity of the COVID-19 pandemic in Europe, preventing further promotional activities in person.

== At Eurovision ==
The Eurovision Song Contest 2020 was originally scheduled to take place at Rotterdam Ahoy in Rotterdam, Netherlands and consist of two semi-finals on 12 and 14 May, and a final on 16 May 2020. According to Eurovision rules, each country, except the host nation and the "Big Five" (France, Germany, Italy, Spain and the United Kingdom), would have been required to qualify from one of two semi-finals to compete for the final; the top 10 countries from each semi-final would have progressed to the final. On 28 January 2020, the allocation draw was held at Rotterdam City Hall, placing Iceland into the first half of the second semi-final. However, due to the COVID-19 pandemic in Europe, the contest was cancelled on 18 March 2020. The EBU announced soon after that entries intended for 2020 would not be eligible for the following year, though each broadcaster would be able to send either their 2020 representative or a new one. Although the contest was cancelled, its producers revealed an official running order for the two semi-finals; had the contest gone ahead as originally planned, Iceland would have performed in the second semi-final in position number 9.

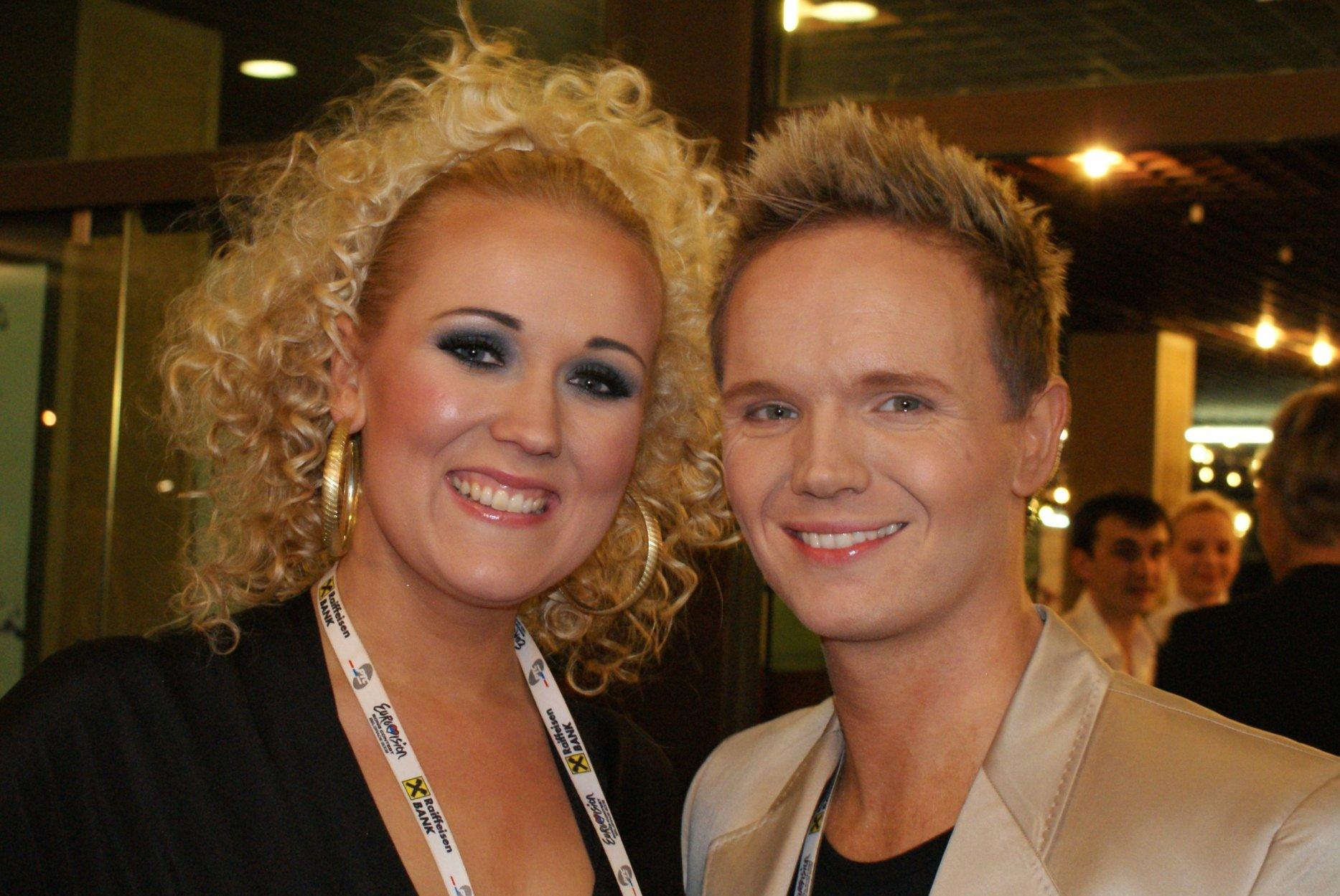
As part of its alternative Eurovision programming, RÚV broadcast a "Eurovision Party" hosted by Eurobandið.

Following the contest's cancellation, RÚV announced a packed schedule of Eurovision programming which they would broadcast over the traditional Eurovision week. This included Alla leið!, an alternative contest to determine Iceland's favourite song from the 2020 contest and the hypothetical recipient of its 12 points; a live broadcast of the EBU's replacement special Eurovision: Europe Shine a Light, which showcased all the artists and songs which would have competed in the contest; a "Eurovision Party" broadcast live from the Harpa concert hall in Reykjavík, hosted by 2008 Icelandic Eurovision entrants Eurobandið and featuring the group and guest artists performing past Eurovision entries; and re-broadcasts of several Eurovision contests from the past. Daði also participated in a number of events organised by the EBU, featuring in an episode of Eurovision Home Concerts where Eurovision artists performed from home during various lockdowns across Europe, and taking part in Eurovision 2020 online host Nikkie de Jager's Eurovisioncalls video series on the official Eurovision YouTube channel and in Europe Shine a Light.

=== Alternative contests ===
Some of the broadcasters scheduled to take part in the Eurovision Song Contest 2020 organised alternative competitions following its cancellation. Austria's ORF broadcast Der kleine Song Contest in April 2020, which saw every entry being assigned to one of three semi-finals. A jury consisting of 10 singers that had represented Austria at Eurovision before was hired to rank each song; the best-placed entry in each semi-final advanced to the final round. Iceland performed in the first semi-final on 14 April and emerged the winner, achieving 75 points. The final on 18 April saw the Austrian public selecting its favourite act of the three qualified entries; Iceland was crowned the winner with 48% of the vote. Iceland's song also partook in Sveriges Television's Sveriges 12:a on 14 May; After qualifying for the final Daði og Gagnamagnið emerged as Sweden's favourite act, gaining maximum points from both the jury and Swedish public, and receiving an invitation to perform at the 2021 edition of Sweden's national selection, Melodifestivalen. Iceland was also ranked as the favourite song of both Australia and Finland, with Daði og Gagnamagnið crowned the winner of Eurovision 2020: Big Night In! on 14 May and Yle Olohuone on 16 May 2020, respectively. Iceland also competed in Germany's Eurovision 2020 – das deutsche Finale; after progressing through the semi-final on 9 May, "Think About Things" was one of 10 songs competing to be voted Germany's favourite song of 2020 in the final on 16 May. Daði gave a live performance of his Eurovision song during the show held at the Elbphilharmonie in Hamburg, subsequently finishing in second place behind Lithuania's The Roop.

== Following the cancellation ==
Following the contest's cancellation, Daði subsequently revealed in an interview with Icelandic radio station Bylgjan that he would be interested in representing Iceland at Eurovision in 2021 but only if invited to do so by RÚV, stating he would not participate in Söngvakeppnin again. On 15 September 2020, Iceland's Head of Delegation Felix Bergsson confirmed RÚV's intention to compete at the Eurovision Song Contest 2021, but at the time he did not reveal whether Daði would be re-selected to represent Iceland again or Söngvakeppnin would make its return. Daði subsequently announced on 23 October 2020 through his Twitter account that he had been selected as Iceland's entrant for the 2021 contest, slated be again joined by Gagnamagnið; RÚV subsequently confirmed this and revealed that Söngvakeppnin would not return in 2021, with Daði og Gagnamagnið's Eurovision entry also being chosen internally.

"Think About Things" went on to enter the music charts in several European countries, reaching number two in the Netherlands, number three in Belgium, the top four in Ireland and the top 40 in both Sweden and the United Kingdom. The song also gained popularity on several Internet media providers, with the song racking up over 17 million views on YouTube, over 75 million plays on Spotify and entering the UK Top 50 and US Viral charts, and featuring on over 115,000 videos on TikTok by May 2020. The song's popularity continued to rise throughout 2020, being used in programming such as the BBC's Strictly Come Dancing in the UK, and in December 2020 "Think About Things" was listed by Time magazine as one of its "10 Best Songs of 2020".
