= Daði Freyr =

Icelandic musician (born 1992)

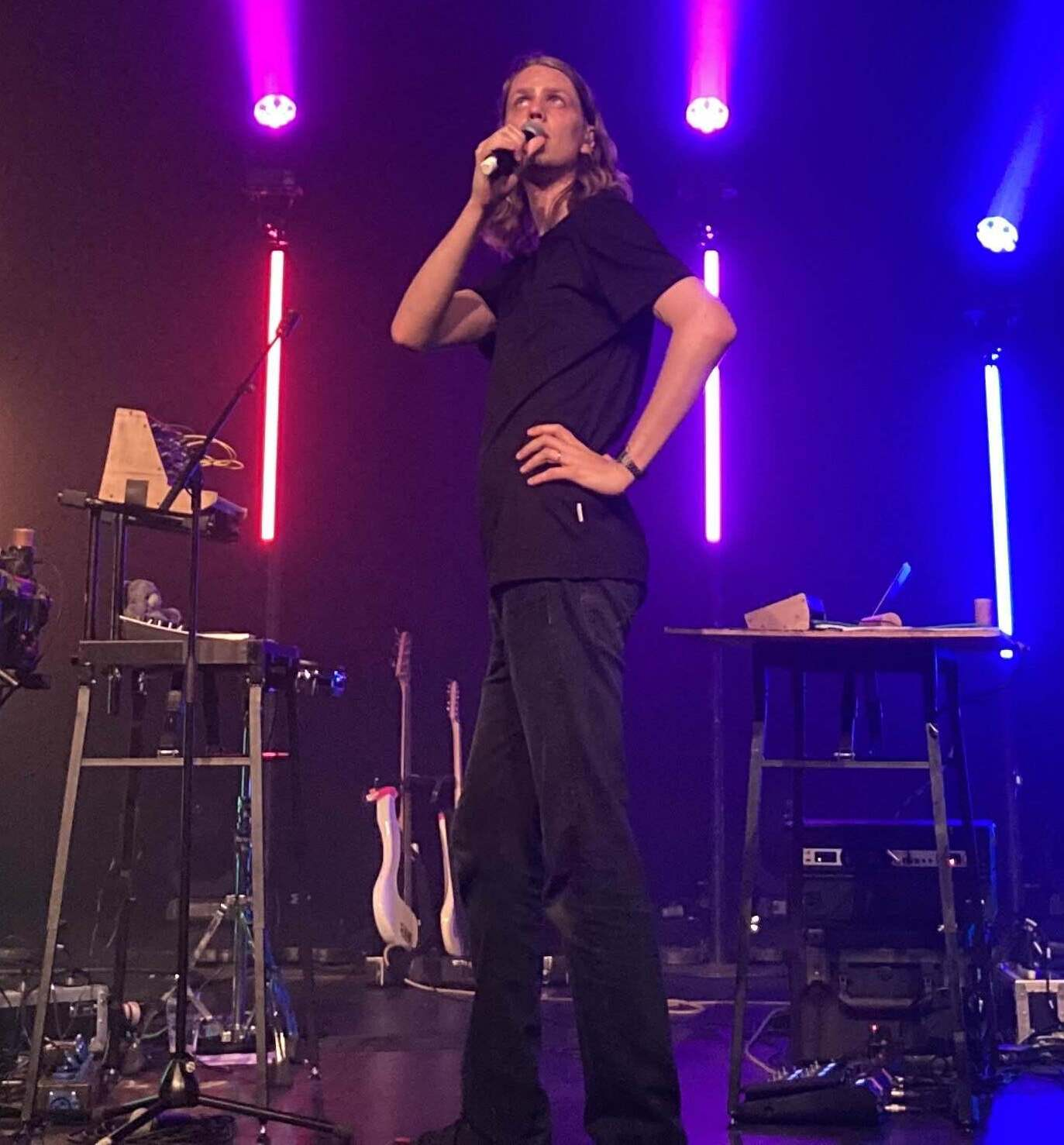
- Daði Freyr performing in 2022

Background information
- Born: Daði Freyr Pétursson; 30 June 1992 (age 34); Reykjavík, Iceland
- Occupation: Musician
- Instruments: Vocals; keyboards; bass; guitar; drums
- Years active: 2012–present
- Website: dadifreyr.com

Daði Freyr Pétursson (Icelandic: [ˈtaːðɪ freiːr̥ ˈpʰjɛːtʏr̥sɔn]; born 30 June 1992), known professionally as Daði Freyr or simply Daði, is an Icelandic musician. As the frontman of Daði & Gagnamagnið (Icelandic: Daði og Gagnamagnið [ˈtaːðɪ ɔɣ ˈkaknaˌmaknɪθ]), he was due to represent Iceland in the Eurovision Song Contest 2020 with the song "Think About Things", before the event was cancelled in response to the COVID-19 pandemic. Instead, he represented Iceland in the Eurovision Song Contest 2021 with the song "10 Years", finishing in fourth place.

== Early life ==
Daði was born in Reykjavík but grew up in Denmark until the age of nine, then his family moved to Iceland and settled in the Southern Region, first in Laugaland and later in Ásahreppur. Daði graduated from Fjölbrautaskóli Suðurlands ("College of the Southern Region") in 2012. In 2014, he moved to Berlin, where he received a BA in music management and audio production at the Catalyst Institute for Creative Arts and Technology in 2017.

== Music career ==
In his youth, Daði practiced drums and studied piano and bass guitar. He co-founded the band RetRoBot with his friend Kristján Pálmi. Later, singer Gunnlaugur Bjarnason and guitarist Guðmundur Einar Vilbergsson, whom he had met at the South Iceland Multicultural School, joined the band. In 2012, the band RetRoBot won the Músíktilraunir ("Music Experiments") and Daði was chosen as the best electronic musician of the year. RetRoBot released one album, Blackout, a year later.

=== Söngvakeppnin and Eurovision ===
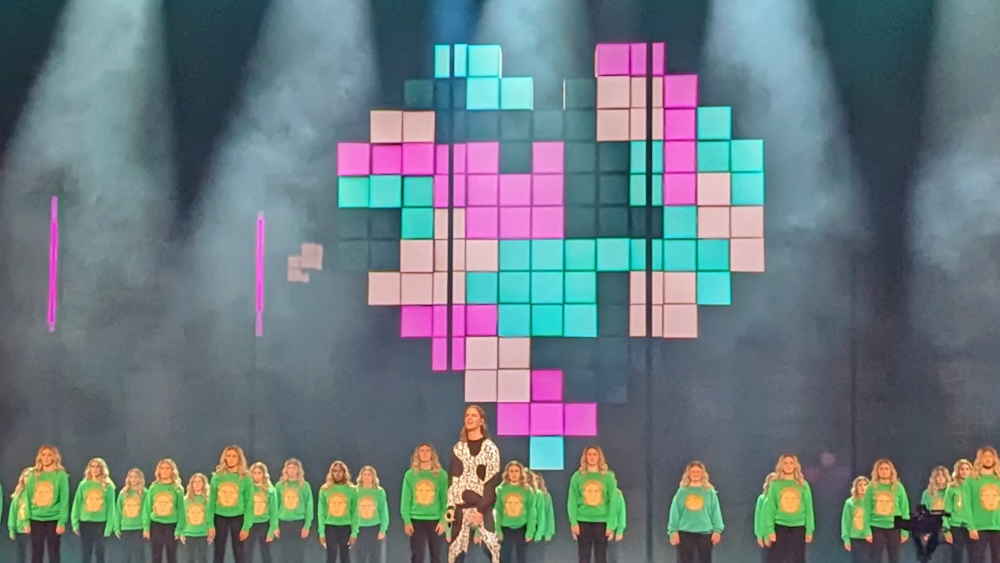
Daði performing in the final of the Eurovision Song Contest 2023 in Liverpool as part of an interval act

==== 2017–2019 ====
In 2017, Daði participated in Söngvakeppnin (competing to represent Iceland in the Eurovision Song Contest 2017) with the song "Is This Love?" (Icelandic: Hvað með það?). In performances, he was supported onstage by a group known as Gagnamagnið, consisting of his sister Sigrún Birna Pétursdóttir (backing vocalist), wife Árný Fjóla Ásmundsdóttir (dancer), and friends Hulda Kristín Kolbrúnardóttir (backing vocalist), Stefán Hannesson (dancer), and Jóhann Sigurður Jóhannsson (dancer). They were characterized by their signature teal green sweaters, which have pixel art portraits of themselves printed on them, as well as their faux "instruments" made of household items and discarded objects that Stefán, Jóhann, and Árný utilize. Daði came in second after Svala Björgvinsdóttir, who performed the song "Paper".

In June 2019, Daði released his debut album, & Co., an avant-garde pop record that has drawn comparisons to French electronic duo Daft Punk for its retro disco sound.

==== 2020–2021 ====
Daði took part in the 2020 Söngvakeppnin with the song "Think About Things" (the alternate Icelandic version also titled "Gagnamagnið"), about his newborn daughter. As in Söngvakeppnin 2017, he performed with his group Gagnamagnið, now collectively credited as Daði & Gagnamagnið. The music video for the song went viral on YouTube, with actor Russell Crowe sharing it online.

They won the 2020 Söngvakeppnin competition and were set to represent Iceland in the Eurovision Song Contest 2020, but the event was cancelled due to the COVID-19 pandemic. Several countries that would have participated in the 2020 contest held their own alternative competitions, broadcasting the entries and crowning a winner. Daði & Gagnamagnið won six such competitions, in Austria (Der kleine Song Contest), Australia, Denmark, Finland, Norway, and Sweden.

On 23 October 2020, it was announced that Daði & Gagnamagnið would remain as Icelandic representatives at the 2021 Eurovision Song Contest. They performed the song "10 Years", the lyrics referencing the length of Daði's relationship with his wife and Gagnamagnið member Árný. They were forced to use a prerecorded performance from the second rehearsal during the semi-final and final, due to a member of the group testing positive for COVID-19. After qualifying for the final, they finished fourth, with 378 points, equaling Iceland's best performance at the competition in terms of points scored.

=== Post-Eurovision ===
Following Eurovision, Daði toured Europe and the United States. He collaborated with Australia's 2021 Eurovision representative Montaigne on their single "make me feel so..." and with German pop rock band Tokio Hotel on the single "Happy People".

In 2023, he performed a cover of Atomic Kitten's "Whole Again" as an interval act during the final of the Eurovision Song Contest 2023, held in Liverpool, alongside a large number of look-alikes as well as his wife.

The same year, he released his second studio record I Made an Album.

On 1 August 2024, he performed at Lollapalooza in Chicago.

On 8 May 2026, he released his third studio album Too Much Not Enough.

== Personal life ==
Daði is married to musician Árný Fjóla Ásmundsdóttir. Their daughter, Áróra Björg, born in 2019, was the inspiration for the lyrics of the song "Think About Things". The couple's second daughter, Kría Sif, was born in 2021.

Daði is 2.08 metres (6 ft 9.9 in) tall. He has his own app called "Neon Planets". His father was a bongo player for Katla Maria in Söngvakeppni 1993, where they placed ninth out of ten contestants with the song "Samba".

== Discography ==
=== Studio albums ===
| Title | Details | Peak chart positions | | |
| Title | Details | SCO | UK Indie | UK Sales |
|---|---|---|---|---|
| & Co. | Released: 12 June 2019; Format: CD, digital download, streaming; Label: Samlist ehf | — | — | — |
| I Made an Album | Released: 25 August 2023; Format: CD, LP, digital download, streaming; Label: AWAL | 38 | 10 | 20 |
| Too Much Not Enough | Released: 8 May 2026; Format: CD, LP, digital download, streaming; Label: Samlist | — | — | — (Note: Too Much Not Enough did not enter the UK Albums Sales chart but peaked at number 92 on the UK Album Downloads chart.) |
"—" denotes an album that did not chart or was not released in that territory.

=== EPs ===
| Title | Details | Peak chart positions | |
| Title | Details | FIN | UK Indie |
|---|---|---|---|
| Næsta skref | Released: 26 October 2017; Format: CD, digital download, streaming; Label: Self-released | — | — |
| Welcome | Released: 21 May 2021; Format: Digital download, streaming; Label: AWAL | 23 | 22 |
| I'm Making an Album 1/3 | Released: 17 March 2023; Format: Digital download, streaming; Label: AWAL | — | — |
| I'm Still Making an Album 2/3 | Released: 26 May 2023; Format: Digital download, streaming; Label: AWAL | — | — |
| How Daði Stole Christmas | Released: 15 November 2024; Format: Digital download, streaming; Label: Samlist | — | — |
"—" denotes an extended play that did not chart or was not released in that territory.

=== Singles ===
==== As lead artist ====
| Title | Year | Peak chart positions | | | | | | | | | Certifications | Album or EP |
| Title | Year | ICE | BEL (FL) | BEL (WA) | IRE | NLD | NOR | SCO | SWE | UK | Certifications | Album or EP |
|---|---|---|---|---|---|---|---|---|---|---|---|---|
| "Seinni tíma vandamál" | 2018 | — | — | — | — | — | — | — | — | — | | Non-album singles |
| "Skiptir ekki máli" | 2018 | — | — | — | — | — | — | — | — | — | | Non-album singles |
| "Allir dagar eru jólin með þér" | 2018 | — | — | — | — | — | — | — | — | — | | Non-album singles |
| "Heyri ekki" (featuring Don Tox) | 2019 | — | — | — | — | — | — | — | — | — | | & Co. |
| "Endurtaka mig" (featuring Blaer) | 2019 | — | — | — | — | — | — | — | — | — | | & Co. |
| "Ég er að fíla mig (Langar ekki að hvíla mig)" | 2019 | — | — | — | — | — | — | — | — | — | | Non-album single |
| "Think About Things" (as Daði og Gagnamagnið) | 2020 | 1 | 53 | — (Note: "Think About Things" did not enter the Tipparade of Walloon but did enter the Bubbling Under.) | 3 | — (Note: "Think About Things" did not enter the Top 40 of Netherlands, but did reach number 16 in the Tipparade.) | — | 10 | 33 | 34 | BPI: Gold | Welcome |
| "Where We Wanna Be" | 2020 | — | — (Note: "Where We Wanna Be" did not enter the Tipparade of Flanders, but did enter the Bubbling Under.) | — | — | — | — | — | — | — | | Non-album singles |
| "Every Moment Is Christmas with You" | 2020 | — | — | — | — | — | — | — | — | — | | Non-album singles |
| "Feel the Love" (with Ásdís) | 2021 | 18 | — | — | — | — | — | — | — | — | | Welcome |
| "10 Years" (as Daði og Gagnamagnið) | 2021 | 1 | — (Note: "10 Years" did not enter the Flemish Ultratop 50, but did peak at number six on the Ultratip chart.) | — | 38 | 15 | 33 | — | 23 | 43 | | Welcome |
| "Somebody Else Now" | 2021 | — | — | — | — | — | — | — | — | — | | Welcome |
| "Something Magical" | 2021 | — | — | — | — | — | — | — | — | — | | Non-album singles |
| "Sabada" (with Filous) | 2022 | — | — | — | — | — | — | — | — | — | | Non-album singles |
| "I'm Fine" | 2022 | — | — | — | — | — | — | — | — | — | | I Made an Album |
| "Whole Again" | 2023 | 2 | — | — | — | — | — | — | — | — (Note: "Whole Again" did not enter the official UK Singles Chart but peaked at No. 24 on the UK Singles Downloads Chart.) | | Non-album single |
| "Moves to Make" | 2023 | — | — | — | — | — | — | — | — | — | | I Made an Album |
| "I'm Not Bitter" | 2024 | — | — | — | — | — | — | — | — | — | | Non-album singles |
| "Outside" | 2024 | — | — | — | — | — | — | — | — | — | | Non-album singles |
| "Fuck City" | 2024 | — | — | — | — | — | — | — | — | — | | Non-album singles |
| "Together" | 2024 | — | — | — | — | — | — | — | — | — | | Non-album singles |
| "I Don't Wanna Talk" | 2025 | 20 | — | — | — | — | — | — | — | — | | Too Much Not Enough |
| "Me and You" | 2025 | 40 | — | — | — | — | — | — | — | — | | Too Much Not Enough |
| "Number One Feeling" (with Louis Futon) | 2025 | — | — | — | — | — | — | — | — | — | | Non-album single |
| "Good Enough" | 2026 | * | — | — | — | — | — | — | — | — | | Too Much Not Enough |
| "Hot Damn" | 2026 | * | — | — | — | — | — | — | — | — | | Too Much Not Enough |
"—" denotes a recording that did not chart or was not released. " * " denotes that the chart did not exist at that time.

==== As featured artist ====
| Title | Year | Album |
|---|---|---|
| "make me feel so..." (Montaigne featuring Daði Freyr) | 2022 | Making It! |
| "Happy People" (Tokio Hotel featuring Daði Freyr) | 2022 | 2001 |

=== Remixes ===
| Title | Original artist | Year | Album |
|---|---|---|---|
| "I Thought I'd Be More Famous by Now" | Special-K | 2018 | Non-album singles |
| "Eye of the Storm" | Millie Turner | 2020 | Non-album singles |

== Awards and achievements ==
| Year | Award | Category | Nominee | Result | Ref. |
|---|---|---|---|---|---|
| 2018 | Icelandic Music Awards | Pop Song of the Year | "Hvað með það" | Nominated | |
| 2021 | Icelandic Music Awards | Best Pop Song | "Think About Things" | Won | |
| 2021 | Hlustendaverðlaunin | Best Music Video | "Think About Things" | Won | |
| 2021 | Hlustendaverðlaunin | Singer of the Year | Himself | Won | |
| 2021 | Sögur Children's Awards | Song of the Year | "10 Years" (with Gagnamagnið) | Won | |
| 2021 | Sögur Children's Awards | Musician of the Year | Himself | Won | |
| 2021 | Sögur Children's Awards | Television Star of the Year | Himself | Nominated | |
| 2021 | Eurovision Awards | Best Dressed | Himself (with Gagnamagnið) | Nominated | |
| 2021 | Eurovision Awards | Most Iconic Prop | Himself (with Gagnamagnið) | Runner-up | |
| 2021 | Eurovision Awards | Best Choreography | Himself (with Gagnamagnið) | Nominated | |
| 2021 | Eurovision Awards | Best Official Video | "10 Years" (with Gagnamagnið) | Runner-up | |
| 2024 | Reykjavík Grapevine Music Awards | Artist of the Year | Himself | Runner-up | |

== Notes ==
| Preceded by Hatari with "Hatrið mun sigra" | Iceland in the Eurovision Song Contest; 2020 (cancelled) (as Daði og Gagnamagnið) | Succeeded by Himself with "10 Years" |
| Preceded by Himself with "Think About Things" | Iceland in the Eurovision Song Contest; 2021 (as Daði og Gagnamagnið) | Succeeded by Systur with "Með hækkandi sól" |
