= Feel the Love =

Feel the Love may refer to:

- "Feel the Love" (Rudimental song), 2012
- "Feel the Love" (Ayumi Hamasaki song), 2013
- "Feel the Love" (Kids See Ghosts song), 2018
- "Feel the Love" (Daði Freyr and Ásdís song), 2021
- "Feel the Love (Oomachasaooma)", a 1983 song by 10cc
- "Feel the Love", a 2022 song by Riker Lynch which represented Colorado in the American Song Contest
- "Feel the Love", a 2023 song by Bananarama
