= Iceland in the Eurovision Song Contest 2019 =

- Eurovision Song Contest 2019
- Participating broadcaster: Ríkisútvarpið (RÚV)
- Country: Iceland
- Selection process: Söngvakeppnin 2019
- Selection date: 2 March 2019

Competing entry
- Song: "Hatrið mun sigra"
- Artist: Hatari
- Songwriters: Einar Hrafn Stefánsson; Klemens Nikulásson Hannigan; Matthías Tryggvi Haraldsson

Placement
- Semi-final result: Qualified (3rd, 221 points)
- Final result: 10th, 232 points

Participation chronology

Iceland was represented at the Eurovision Song Contest 2019 with the song "Hatrið mun sigra" written by Einar Hrafn Stefánsson, Klemens Nikulásson Hannigan and Matthías Tryggvi Haraldsson. The song was performed by the group Hatari. The Icelandic entry for the 2019 contest in Tel Aviv, Israel was selected through the national final Söngvakeppnin 2019, organised by the Icelandic broadcaster Ríkisútvarpið (RÚV). The selection consisted of two semi-finals and a final, held on 9 February, 16 February and 2 March 2019, respectively. Five songs competed in each semi-final with the top two as selected by a public televote alongside a jury wildcard advancing to the final. In the final, the winner was selected over two rounds of voting: the first involved a 50/50 combination of jury voting and public televoting, which reduced the five competing entries to two superfinalists and the second round selected the winner exclusively through public televoting. "Hatrið mun sigra" performed by Hatari emerged as the winner after gaining 57.71% of the public vote.

Iceland was drawn to compete in the first semi-final of the Eurovision Song Contest which took place on 14 May 2019. Performing during the show in position 13, "Hatrið mun sigra" was announced among the top 10 entries of the first semi-final and therefore qualified to compete in the final on 18 May. It was later revealed that Iceland placed third out of the 17 participating countries in the semi-final with 221 points. In the final, Iceland performed in position 17 and placed tenth out of the 26 participating countries, scoring 232 points.

== Background ==
Prior to the 2019 contest, Iceland had participated in the Eurovision Song Contest thirty-one times since its first entry in 1986. Iceland's best placing in the contest to this point was second, which it achieved on two occasions: in 1999 with the song "All Out of Luck" performed by Selma and in 2009 with the song "Is It True?" performed by Yohanna. Since the introduction of a semi-final to the format of the Eurovision Song Contest in 2004, Iceland has, to this point, failed to qualify to the final seven times. In 2018, Iceland failed to qualify to the final with the song "Our Choice" performed by Ari Ólafsson.

The Icelandic national broadcaster, Ríkisútvarpið (RÚV), broadcasts the event within Iceland and organises the selection process for the nation's entry. Despite calls to boycott the contest due to the ongoing Israeli–Palestinian conflict, which included a petition that collected over 27,000 signatures, RÚV confirmed their intentions to participate at the 2019 Eurovision Song Contest on 13 September 2018. Since 2006, Iceland has used a national final to select their entry for the Eurovision Song Contest, a method that continued for their 2019 participation.

== Before Eurovision ==
=== Söngvakeppnin 2019 ===
Söngvakeppnin 2019 was the national final format developed by RÚV in order to select Iceland's entry for the Eurovision Song Contest 2019. The three shows in the competition were hosted by Fannar Sveinsson and Benedikt Valsson and all took place in Reykjavík: the two semi-finals were held at the Háskólabíó venue and the final took place at the Laugardalshöll. The semi-finals and final were broadcast on RÚV and online at the broadcaster's official website ruv.is.

==== Format ====
Ten songs in total competed in Söngvakeppnin 2019 where the winner was determined after two semi-finals and a final. Five songs competed in each semi-final on 9 and 16 February 2019. The top two songs from each semi-final, as determined by public televoting qualified to the final which took place on 2 March 2019. A jury also selected a wildcard act for the final out of the remaining non-qualifying acts from both semi-finals. The winning entry in the final was determined over two rounds of voting: the first to select the top two via 50/50 public televoting and jury voting and the second to determine the winner with 100% televoting. All songs were required to be performed in Icelandic during the semi-final portion of the competition. In the final, the song was required to be performed in the language that the artist intended to perform in at the Eurovision Song Contest in Tel Aviv. In addition to selecting the Icelandic entry for Eurovision, a monetary prize of one million Icelandic króna was awarded to the songwriters responsible for the winning entry.

==== Competing entries ====
On 20 September 2018, RÚV opened the submission period for interested songwriters to submit their entries until the deadline on 22 October 2018. Songwriters were required to be Icelandic, possess Icelandic citizenship or have permanent residency in Iceland between 1 September 2018 and 19 May 2019. However, exceptions would be made for minor collaborations with foreign songwriters as long as two-thirds of the composition and half of the lyrics are by Icelandic composers/lyricists. Composers had the right to submit up to two entries, while lyricists could contribute to an unlimited amount of entries. At the close of the submission deadline, 132 entries were received. A total of ten entries were selected from the submissions by a seven-member selection committee formed under consultation with the Association of Composers (FTT) and the Icelandic Musicians' Union (FÍH), as well as from entries created by composers invited by RÚV for the competition. The ten competing artists and songs were revealed and presented by the broadcaster during the television programme Kynningarþáttur Söngvakeppninnar on 26 January 2019. Among the competing artists are previous Icelandic Eurovision entrants Friðrik Ómar, who represented Iceland in 2008 as member of Euroband, and Hera Björk, who represented Iceland in 2010.

Artist	Song		Songwriter(s)
Artist	Icelandic Title	English Title	Songwriter(s)
Daníel Óliver	"Samt ekki"	"Licky Licky"	Daníel Óliver Svensson, Linus Emanuel Josefsson, Peter Henning Göransson von Arbin
Elli Grill, Skaði, Glymur	"Jeijó, keyrum alla leið"	—N/a	Barði Jóhannsson
Friðrik Ómar	"Hvað ef ég get ekki elskað?"	"What If I Can't Have Love?"	Friðrik Ómar Hjörleifsson, Sveinbjörn I. Baldvinsson
Hatari	"Hatrið mun sigra"	—N/a	Einar Hrafn Stefánsson, Klemens Nikulásson Hannigan, Matthías Tryggvi Haraldsson
Heiðrún Anna Björnsdóttir	"Helgi"	"Sunday Boy"	Heiðrún Anna Björnsdóttir, Sævar Sigurgeirsson
Hera Björk	"Eitt andartak"	"Moving On"	Örlygur Smári, Hera Björk Þórhallsdóttir, Valgeir Magnússon
Ívar Daníels	"Þú bætir mig"	"Make Me Whole"	Stefán Þór Steindórsson, Richard Micallef, Nikos Sofis
Kristina Skoubo Bærendsen	"Ég á mig sjálf"	"Mama Said"	Sveinn Rúnar Sigurðsson, Valgeir Magnússon
Tara Mobee	"Betri án þín"	"Fighting for Love"	Andri Þór Jónsson, Eyþór Úlfar Þórisson, Tara Mobee
Þórdís Imsland	"Nú og hér"	"What Are You Waiting For?"	Svala Björgvinsdóttir, Bjarki Ómarsson, Stefán Hilmarsson

==== Semi-finals ====
The two semi-finals took place on 9 and 16 February 2019. In each semi-final five acts presented their entries, and the top two entries voted upon solely by public televoting proceeded to the final. "Ég á mig sjálf" performed by Kristina Skoubo Bærendsen was awarded the jury wildcard and also proceeded to the final. The second semi-final also featured a guest performance by Bríet who covered the 2012 Eurovision winning entry "Euphoria".

Semi-final 1 – 9 February 2019
R/O	Artist	Song	Televote	Place	Result
1	Hatari	"Hatrið mun sigra"	12,069	1	Advanced
2	Þórdís Imsland	"Nú og hér"	4,271	4	—N/a
3	Daníel Óliver	"Samt ekki"	2,198	5	—N/a
4	Kristina Skoubo Bærendsen	"Ég á mig sjálf"	4,779	3	Wildcard
5	Hera Björk	"Eitt andartak"	8,408	2	Advanced

Semi-final 2 – 16 February 2019
R/O	Artist	Song	Televote	Place	Result
1	Elli Grill, Skaði, Glymur	"Jeijó, keyrum alla leið"	2,572	5	—N/a
2	Ívar Daníels	"Þú bætir mig"	3,519	3	—N/a
3	Heiðrún Anna Björnsdóttir	"Helgi"	2,772	4	—N/a
4	Tara Mobee	"Betri án þín"	3,819	2	Advanced
5	Friðrik Ómar	"Hvað ef ég get ekki elskað?"	14,968	1	Advanced

==== Final ====
The final took place on 2 March 2019 where the five entries that qualified from the preceding two semi-finals competed. In the semi-finals, all competing entries were required to be performed in Icelandic; however, entries competing in the final were required to be presented in the language they would compete with in the Eurovision Song Contest. Two entries remained in Icelandic ("Hvað ef ég get ekki elskað?" performed by Friðrik Ómar and "Hatrið mun sigra" performed by Hatari), while the other three entries competed in English. In the first round of voting, votes from a ten-member international and Icelandic jury panel (50%) and public televoting (50%) determined the top two entries. The top two entries advanced to a second round of voting, the superfinal, where the winner, "Hatrið mun sigra" performed by Hatari, was determined by aggregating the televotes from the first round to the televotes of the second.

The jury panel that voted in the first round consisted of:

- Anders M. Tangen (Norway) – television and radio host
- Birgit Simal (Belgium) – television producer
- Eleni Foureira (Greece) – singer, dancer, 2018 Cypriot Eurovision entrant
- Jan Bors (Czech Republic) – Eurovision Head of Delegation
- Karin Gunnarsson (Sweden) – music consultant
- Konstantin Hudov (Ukraine) – Head of Press for the Azerbaijani Eurovision Delegation
- Haraldur Freyr Gíslason (Iceland) – musician, member of the band and 2014 Icelandic Eurovision entrant Pollapönk
- Molly Plank (Denmark) – Eurovision Head of Delegation
- Sigríður Thorlacius (Iceland) – singer, composer, member of the band Hjaltalín
- Þorsteinn Hreggviðsson (Iceland) – program director for Rás 2

In addition to the performances of the competing artists, the interval acts featured guest performances by 2018 Icelandic Eurovision entrant Ari Ólafsson, and Eleni Foureira.

Final – 2 March 2019
R/O	Artist	Song	Jury	Televote	Total	Place
1	Friðrik Ómar	"Hvað ef ég get ekki elskað?"	21,061	25,356	46,417	2
2	Kristina Skoubo Bærendsen	"Mama Said"	20,582	17,391	37,937	3
3	Tara Mobee	"Fighting for Love"	16,274	3,170	19,444	5
4	Hera Björk	"Moving On"	20,102	9,488	29,590	4
5	Hatari	"Hatrið mun sigra"	24,891	47,513	72,404	1

Detailed Jury Votes
R/O	Song	Juror										Total
R/O	Song	1	2	3	4	5	6	7	8	9	10	Total
1	"Hvað ef ég get ekki elskað?"	1,915	1,915	1,675	2,872	2,393	1,436	2,393	1,675	1,915	2,872	21,061
2	"Mama Said"	1,436	2,393	2,872	1,915	1,915	1,915	1,675	2,393	2,393	1,675	20,582
3	"Fighting for Love"	1,675	1,436	1,915	1,675	1,436	1,675	1,915	1,436	1,675	1,436	16,274
4	"Moving On"	2,393	1,675	2,393	2,393	1,675	2,393	1,436	1,915	1,436	2,393	20,102
5	"Hatrið mun sigra"	2,872	2,872	1,436	1,436	2,872	2,872	2,872	2,872	2,872	1,915	24,891

Superfinal – 2 March 2019
R/O	Artist	Song	Votes			Place
R/O	Artist	Song	First Round	Second Round	Total	Place
1	Friðrik Ómar	"Hvað ef ég get ekki elskað?"	46,417	52,134	98,551	2
2	Hatari	"Hatrið mun sigra"	72,404	62,088	134,492	1

== At Eurovision ==
According to Eurovision rules, all nations with the exceptions of the host country and the "Big Five" (France, Germany, Italy, Spain and the United Kingdom) are required to qualify from one of two semi-finals in order to compete for the final; the top ten countries from each semi-final progress to the final. The European Broadcasting Union (EBU) split up the competing countries into six different pots based on voting patterns from previous contests, with countries with favourable voting histories put into the same pot. On 28 January 2019, a special allocation draw was held which placed each country into one of the two semi-finals, as well as which half of the show they would perform in. Iceland was placed into the first semi-final, to be held on 14 May 2019, and was scheduled to perform in the second half of the show.

Once all the competing songs for the 2019 contest had been released, the running order for the semi-finals was decided by the shows' producers rather than through another draw, so that similar songs were not placed next to each other. Iceland was set to perform in position 13, following the entry from Australia and before the entry from Estonia.

The two semi-finals and the final were broadcast in Iceland on RÚV with commentary by Gísli Marteinn Baldursson. Alex Elliott also provided English commentary on RÚV 2 for the semi-finals and for the online broadcast of the final. The Icelandic spokesperson, who announced the top 12-point score awarded by the Icelandic jury during the final, was Jóhannes Haukur Jóhannesson.

=== Semi-final ===
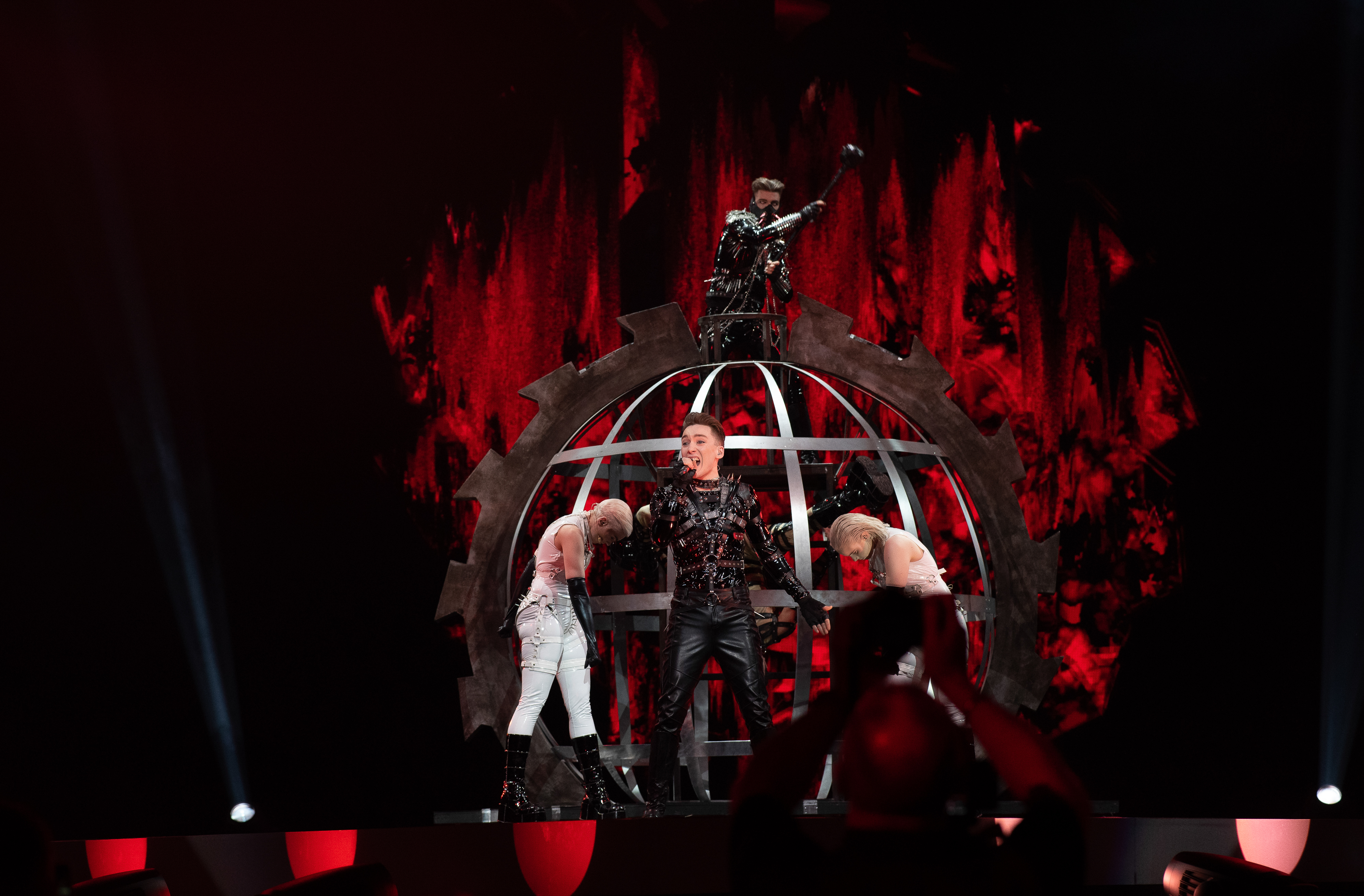
Hatari during a rehearsal before the first semi-final

Hatari took part in technical rehearsals on 3 and 6 May, followed by dress rehearsals on 9 and 10 May. This included the jury show on 9 May where the professional juries of each country watched and voted on the competing entries.

The Icelandic performance featured the members of Hatari dressed in rubber outfits with harnesses and chains, designed by designers Karen Briem and Andri Hrafn Unnarsson, with drummer Einar Hrafn Stefánsson placed on top of a metal globe on stage and joined by three dancers: Sólbjört Sigurðardóttir, Andrean Sigurgeirsson and Ástrós Guðjónsdóttir. The performance began with Sigurðardóttir in the globe, of which she then broke out of the main stage. The LED screens displayed red chains pulling vertically up and down. The performance also featured pyrotechnic effects. The creative director for the performance was Lee Proud, who also completed the choreography.

At the end of the show, Iceland was announced as having finished in the top 10 and subsequently qualifying for the grand final. It was later revealed that Iceland placed third in the semi-final, receiving a total of 221 points: 151 points from the televoting and 70 points from the juries.

=== Final ===
Shortly after the first semi-final, a winners' press conference was held for the ten qualifying countries. As part of this press conference, the qualifying artists took part in a draw to determine which half of the grand final they would subsequently participate in. This draw was done in the order the countries were announced during the semi-final. Iceland was drawn to compete in the second half. Following this draw, the shows' producers decided upon the running order of the final, as they had done for the semi-finals. Iceland was subsequently placed to perform in position 17, following the entry from United Kingdom and before the entry from Estonia.

Hatari once again took part in dress rehearsals on 17 and 18 May before the final, including the jury final where the professional juries cast their final votes before the live show. The group performed a repeat of their semi-final performance during the final on 18 May. Iceland placed tenth in the final, scoring 232 points: 186 points from the televoting and 46 points from the juries. While the televoting points for Iceland were announced, members of Hatari unveiled banners displaying the Palestinian flag, which was met with loud booing throughout the arena. RÚV was later fined €5,000 by the EBU due to breaking the no-politics rule, with the broadcaster stating that they were "dissatisfied with the handling of the case and the proposed outcome" as the group's actions were their own responsibility.

=== Voting ===
Voting during the three shows involved each country awarding two sets of points from 1–8, 10 and 12: one from their professional jury and the other from televoting. Each nation's jury consisted of five music industry professionals who are citizens of the country they represent, with their names published before the contest to ensure transparency. This jury judged each entry based on: vocal capacity; the stage performance; the song's composition and originality; and the overall impression by the act. In addition, no member of a national jury was permitted to be related in any way to any of the competing acts in such a way that they cannot vote impartially and independently. The individual rankings of each jury member as well as the nation's televoting results were released shortly after the grand final.

Below is a breakdown of points awarded to Iceland and awarded by Iceland in the first semi-final and grand final of the contest, and the breakdown of the jury voting and televoting conducted during the two shows:

==== Points awarded to Iceland ====
Points awarded to Iceland (Semi-final 1)
Score	Televote	Jury
12 points	Australia; Belarus; Finland; Poland	France
10 points	France; Hungary; Slovenia; Spain	Australia; Belgium
8 points	Portugal	Cyprus
7 points	Belgium; Greece; San Marino	San Marino
6 points	Czech Republic; Estonia; Georgia; Montenegro; Serbia	
5 points		Poland
4 points		Finland; Montenegro; Slovenia
3 points	Israel	
2 points		Estonia; Greece
1 point	Cyprus	Belarus; Hungary

Points awarded to Iceland (Final)
Score	Televote	Jury
12 points	Finland; Hungary; Poland	
10 points	Australia; Norway	Belgium
8 points	Sweden; United Kingdom	Australia
7 points	Belarus; Italy; Latvia; Netherlands; Russia; Slovenia	
6 points	Austria; Czech Republic; Ireland; Lithuania	Lithuania; San Marino
5 points	Estonia; Romania; Serbia	France
4 points	Denmark	Czech Republic
3 points	Armenia; Belgium; Croatia; Georgia; Portugal; Spain	Poland
2 points	Germany; Greece; Montenegro; San Marino	North Macedonia; Russia
1 point	France; Malta; Moldova	

==== Points awarded by Iceland ====
Points awarded by Iceland (Semi-final 1)
Score	Televote	Jury
12 points	Czech Republic	Australia
10 points	Australia	Czech Republic
8 points	Poland	Greece
7 points	Estonia	Estonia
6 points	Belarus	Serbia
5 points	Slovenia	Slovenia
4 points	San Marino	Belgium
3 points	Hungary	Belarus
2 points	Finland	San Marino
1 point	Belgium	Cyprus

Points awarded by Iceland (Final)
Score	Televote	Jury
12 points	Norway	Sweden
10 points	Australia	Australia
8 points	Sweden	North Macedonia
7 points	Switzerland	Netherlands
6 points	Italy	Czech Republic
5 points	Netherlands	Switzerland
4 points	Denmark	Azerbaijan
3 points	Estonia	Italy
2 points	Czech Republic	Serbia
1 point	San Marino	France

==== Detailed voting results ====
The following members comprised the Icelandic jury:

- Hrafnhildur Halldórsdóttir (jury chairperson) – radio host, singer
- Óskar Einarsson
- María Ólafsdóttir – singer, represented Iceland in the 2015 contest
- Jóhann Hjörleifsson – drummer
- Lovísa Árnadóttir – communication manager

Detailed voting results from Iceland (Semi-final 1)
R/O	Country	Jury							Televote	
R/O	Country	H. Halldórsdóttir	Ó. Einarsson	M. Ólafsdóttir	J. Hjörleifsson	L. Árnadóttir	Rank	Points	Rank	Points
01	Cyprus	12	12	4	13	4	10	1	11	
02	Montenegro	11	15	13	15	16	15		16	
03	Finland	13	9	10	14	14	13		9	2
04	Poland	7	11	12	6	7	12		3	8
05	Slovenia	8	4	5	10	3	6	5	6	5
06	Czech Republic	10	3	2	3	1	2	10	1	12
07	Hungary	9	6	8	11	6	11		8	3
08	Belarus	14	7	3	7	8	8	3	5	6
09	Serbia	6	8	6	1	11	5	6	14	
10	Belgium	5	10	7	9	2	7	4	10	1
11	Georgia	16	13	14	12	13	14		15	
12	Australia	4	2	1	2	5	1	12	2	10
13	Iceland									
14	Estonia	1	5	11	5	10	4	7	4	7
15	Portugal	15	16	16	16	15	16		13	
16	Greece	3	1	9	8	9	3	8	12	
17	San Marino	2	14	15	4	12	9	2	7	4

Detailed voting results from Iceland (Final)
R/O	Country	Jury							Televote	
R/O	Country	H. Halldórsdóttir	Ó. Einarsson	M. Ólafsdóttir	J. Hjörleifsson	L. Árnadóttir	Rank	Points	Rank	Points
01	Malta	15	16	8	7	21	15		12	
02	Albania	25	20	24	18	23	23		23	
03	Czech Republic	10	10	3	2	9	5	6	9	2
04	Germany	14	24	5	22	16	17		22	
05	Russia	9	6	12	24	17	14		18	
06	Denmark	8	13	13	6	20	12		7	4
07	San Marino	19	23	25	20	25	24		10	1
08	North Macedonia	3	9	11	1	8	3	8	16	
09	Sweden	2	1	1	4	3	1	12	3	8
10	Slovenia	16	19	15	15	5	16		15	
11	Cyprus	23	17	9	19	12	18		19	
12	Netherlands	7	3	4	17	4	4	7	6	5
13	Greece	22	21	21	23	18	22		21	
14	Israel	24	25	23	14	24	21		25	
15	Norway	17	5	14	8	13	11		1	12
16	United Kingdom	21	18	18	11	14	19		24	
17	Iceland									
18	Estonia	4	15	17	12	15	13		8	3
19	Belarus	18	14	16	21	19	20		17	
20	Azerbaijan	5	7	10	9	6	7	4	13	
21	France	11	11	6	13	7	10	1	14	
22	Italy	12	8	20	16	1	8	3	5	6
23	Serbia	13	12	7	3	11	9	2	20	
24	Switzerland	6	4	19	10	2	6	5	4	7
25	Australia	1	2	2	5	10	2	10	2	10
26	Spain	20	22	22	25	22	25		11	
