= Where We Wanna Be =

Single by Daði Freyr
- Released: 21 May 2020
- Length: 2:33
- Label: AWAL
- Songwriter: Daði Freyr
- Producer: Daði Freyr

Daði Freyr singles chronology
"Think About Things" (2020)	"Where We Wanna Be" (2020)	"Every Moment Is Christmas with You" (2020)

"Where We Wanna Be" is a song by Icelandic singer Daði Freyr. The song was released as a digital download on 21 May 2020 by AWAL. The song was written and produced by Daði Freyr.

== Background ==
Talking about the song, Daði Freyr said, "This song is about having people in your life that you love when faced with difficult times. [...] I wrote 'Where We Wanna Be' from start to finish in my home studio in Berlin, when there was a 2-person maximum in Germany. Spending so much time without meeting any new people can be tough, so I was really lucky to be stuck with my two favourite people in the world: my wife Árný and our daughter."

== Music video ==
A music video to accompany the release of "Where We Wanna Be" was first released onto YouTube on 21 May 2020. The video was directed by his wife Árný Fjóla. The video shows Daði Freyr dancing to the song in his living room.

== Track listing ==
Digital download
No.	Title	Length
1.	"Where We Wanna Be"	2:33
2.	"Think About Things"	2:53

== Charts ==
Chart (2020)	Peak position
Belgium (Ultratip Flanders)	—N/a (Note: "Where We Wanna Be" did not reach the Flemish Ultratop 50 chart, but was registered on the Ultratip Bubbling Under ranking, although its peak position was not revealed.)

== Release history ==
Region	Date	Format	Label
Various	21 May 2020	Digital download; streaming	AWAL
