= Hatari (band) =

Icelandic band and performance art group

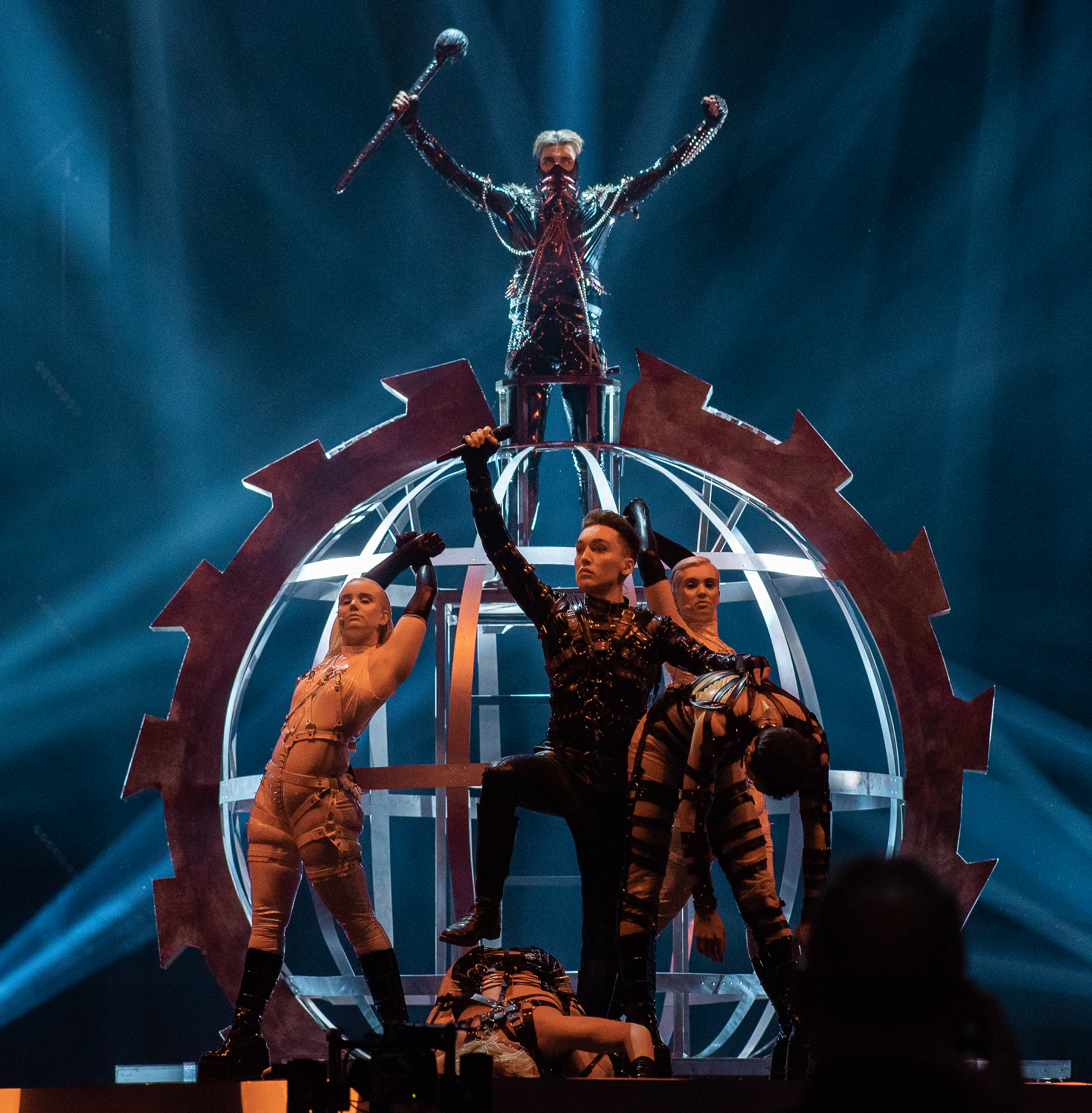
- Hatari performing at the Eurovision Song Contest 2019 in Tel Aviv, Israel

Background information
- Origin: Reykjavík, Iceland
- Genres: Techno; industrial; punk rock; aggrotech
- Years active: 2015–present
- Label: Svikamylla ehf.
- Members: Klemens Hannigan; Davíð Katrínarson; Einar Stefánsson
- Past members: Matthías Haraldsson
- Website: hatari.is

Hatari (Icelandic pronunciation: [ˈhaːtarɪ]; lit. 'Hater') are an Icelandic techno, industrial and punk rock band and performance art group from Reykjavík. Their public image incorporates elements of anti-capitalism and BDSM attire. The band currently consists of Klemens Hannigan, Einar Stefánsson and Davíð Katrínarson, the latter of whom replacing original member Matthías Haraldsson in 2023. They have released an album and an extended play, encompassing several singles. Hatari represented Iceland in the Eurovision Song Contest 2019 with their song "Hatrið mun sigra", finishing tenth.

== History ==
=== Early history (2015–2018) ===
Hatari was formed in mid-2015 by cousins Klemens Hannigan and Matthías Haraldsson. At the time, Klemens had begun writing electronic music that Matthías would provide screaming vocals for. Klemens later presented the songs to Einar Stefánsson, who joined the duo as their drummer. Klemens and Einar, together with drummer Sólrún Mjöll Kjartansdóttir, had previously also formed the band Kjurr in late 2012; in the band, Klemens played the guitar and provided vocals, while Einar played the bass. Throughout 2016, Hatari performed five times, including appearances in Reykjavík, at Eistnaflug, at LungA Festival, and at Norðanpaunk, prior to their break-out performances at Iceland Airwaves, held at Kex Hostel in Reykjavík, on 31 October and 6 November 2016. The band's debut extended play (EP), named Neysluvara, was released through Svikamylla ehf. via Spotify and Bandcamp on 31 October 2017. Leading up to the EP's release, the band also released music videos for two songs from the EP, "Ódýr" and "X". In December 2017, Hatari was featured on the song "Hlauptu", released on the album Horror by Cyber.

On 21 December 2018, Hatari announced that the board of directors of Svikamylla ehf. had passed a resolution to dissolve the band. However, Hatari did not dissolve as they appeared at Eurosonic Noorderslag, a music event held in the Netherlands, shortly after that. Simultaneous to the dissolution announcement, Hatari released the music video for a new single, "Spillingardans".

=== Eurovision Song Contest (2019) ===
In January 2019, Hatari was confirmed as one of the ten acts competing in Söngvakeppnin 2019, Iceland's national selection for its entry in the Eurovision Song Contest 2019, with their new song "Hatrið mun sigra". Hatari won Söngvakeppnin 2019 in March that year, and thus represented Iceland in the Eurovision Song Contest in May.

In the lead-up to the competition, Hatari made headlines with a number of political statements over the Israeli occupation of Palestine and other matters, resulting in Jon Ola Sand, the executive supervisor of the European Broadcasting Union (EBU), warning them that they had reached the limit of the EBU's patience, and would be disqualified should they choose to bring its political statements to the stage. However, when Iceland's televote score was announced at the end of the final, members of Hatari held up banners displaying the flag of Palestine. As a result, the EBU imposed on RÚV the minimum possible fine of €5,000. Overall, Hatari received 232 points in the final, finishing in 10th place.

=== Subsequent releases and tours (2019–present) ===
On 23 May 2019, the day of their homecoming concert, Hatari released "Klefi / Samed", a single featuring Palestinian musician Bashar Murad, with a music video. The video was filmed in the desert by Jericho, Palestine, and the song features lyrics in Icelandic and Arabic. A further single, "Klámstrákur", was released that October. Hatari's first album, Neyslutrans, was released on 17 January 2020, also featuring the four prior singles. A remix album, Neyslutrans Remixed, was released on 19 February 2021.

On 17 July 2019, Hatari announced their 2020 "Europe Will Crumble" tour, with Cyber as their supporting act. On 29 January 2020, a few hours before their concert at the Copenhagen venue Vega, a fire broke out, but nobody was hurt. The second of two tour legs was cancelled due to the COVID-19 pandemic. It was replaced by the "Dance or Die" tour, which was announced in November 2020 and advertised with a "post-human experience".

== Members ==
Hatari primarily consists of musicians Klemens Hannigan, Davíð Katrínarson, and Einar Stefánsson, as well as several contributors.

=== Klemens Hannigan ===
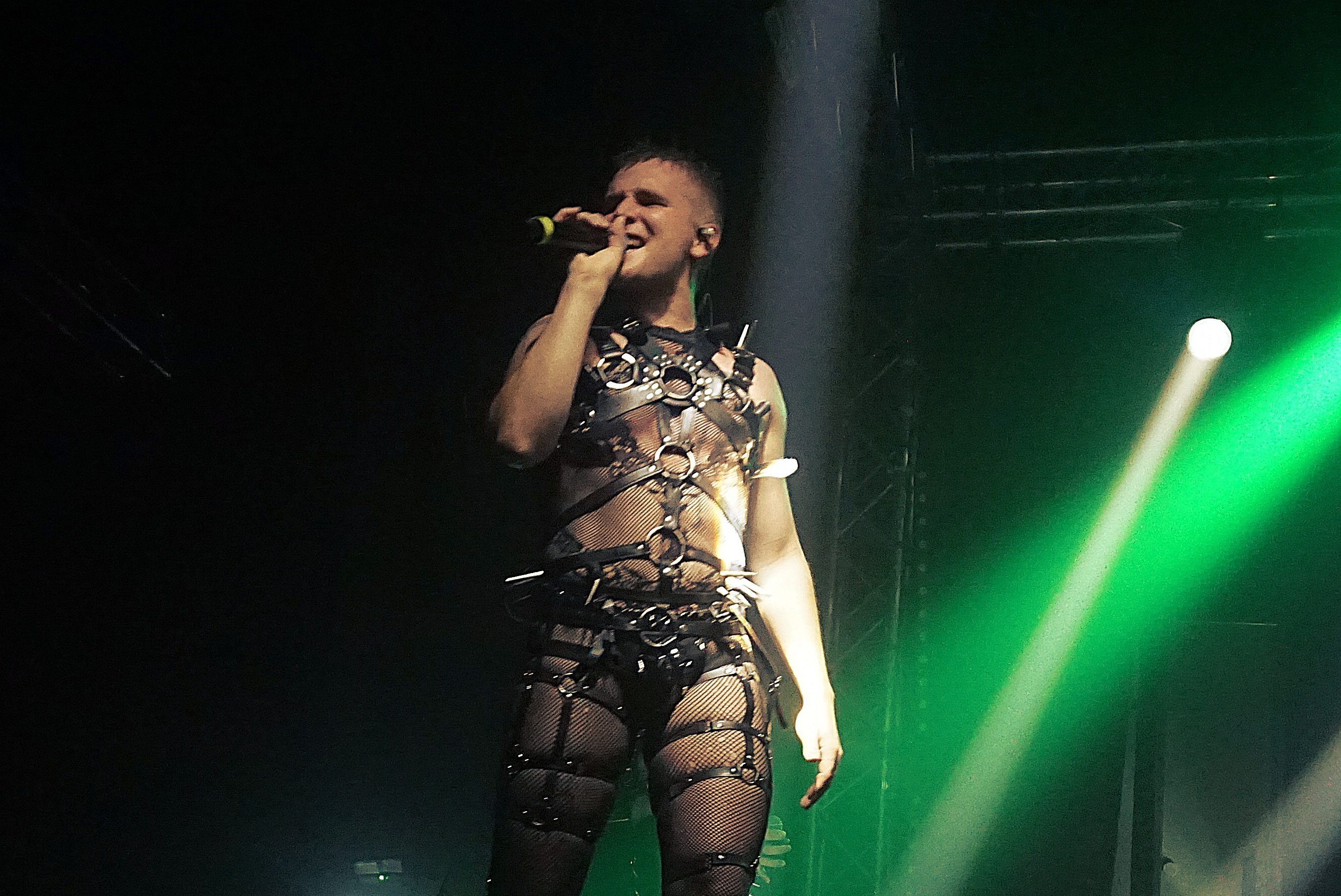
Klemens Hannigan with Hatari at The Dome in Tufnell Park, London

Klemens Nikulásson Hannigan (born 20 December 1994) is the group's vocalist and is the cousin of Matthías. He is the son of Nikulás Hannigan, the head of the trade office division at Iceland's Ministry for Foreign Affairs, and Rán Tryggvadóttir, a lawyer for legal firm LMB Mandat. Klemens has three daughters and married Ronja Mogensen on Christmas 2023. He graduated from Tækniskólinn as a furniture maker.

=== Davíð Katrínarson ===
Davíð Þór Katrínarson (also known as David Thor, born 23 March 1993) is a vocalist for the group who joined in 2023, following the departure of Matthías Haraldsson. He has performed with the group since 2017, and appeared as the lead vocalist on the song Helvíti on the band's 2020 album Neyslutrans, credited under his stagename Svarti Laxness. He was announced as a member via social media, and made his first appearance with the band as a member at the 2023 edition of Iceland Airwaves. He is also an actor, and has appeared in shows such as Trapped.

=== Einar Stefánsson ===
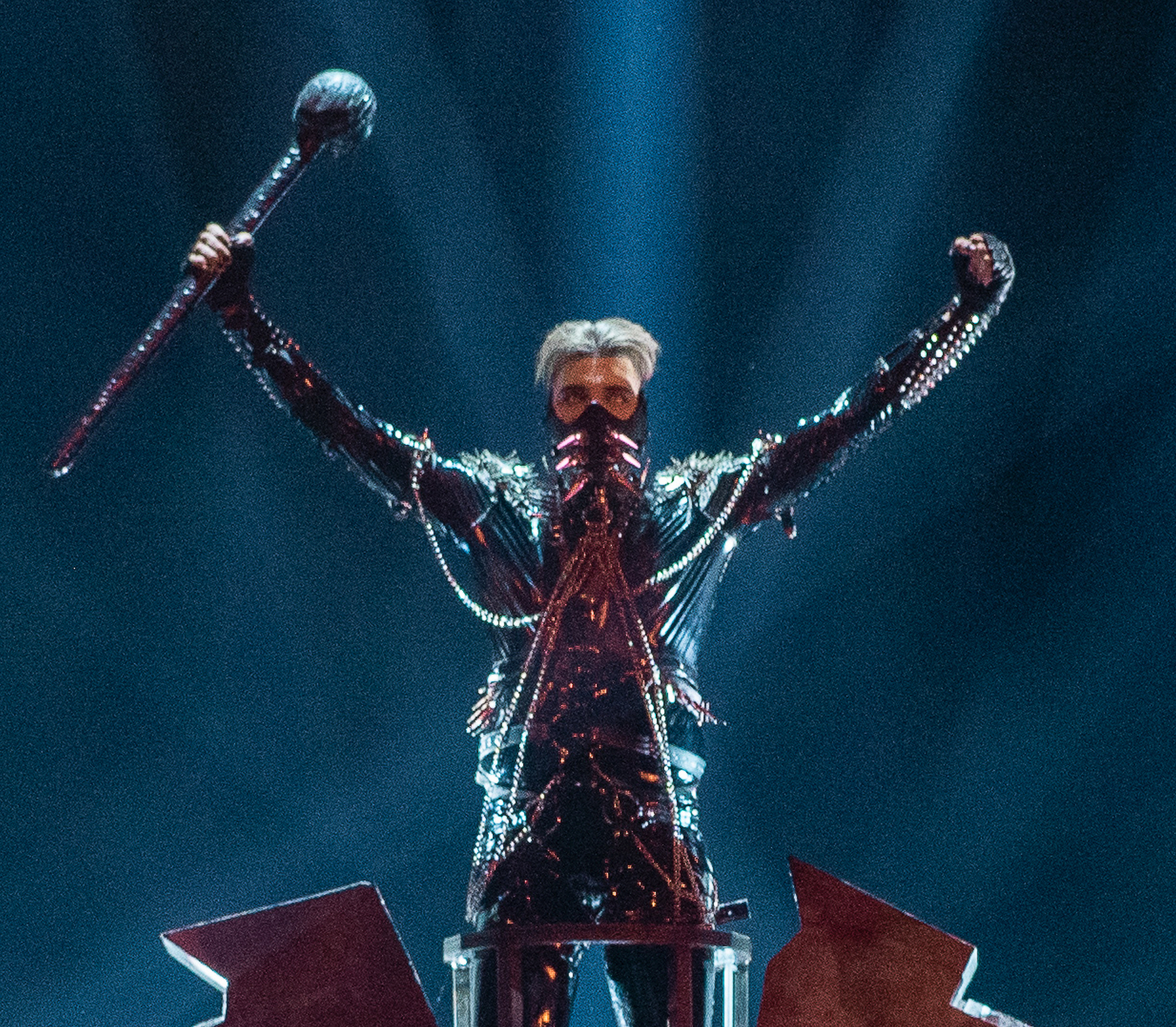
Einar Stefánsson with Hatari at Eurovision 2019 in Tel Aviv, Israel.

Einar Hrafn Stefánsson (also known as Einar Stef, born 1 September 1992) is the drummer and producer for the group. He is the son of Stefán Haukur Jóhannesson, the Icelandic ambassador to Japan, and former ambassador to the United Kingdom. Outside Hatari, he is also the bassist of Vök, an Icelandic indie pop and electronica group formed in 2013. Einar married Sólbjört, a dancer for the group, on 30 July 2023, and they have 2 children together as of 2026.

=== Matthías Haraldsson ===
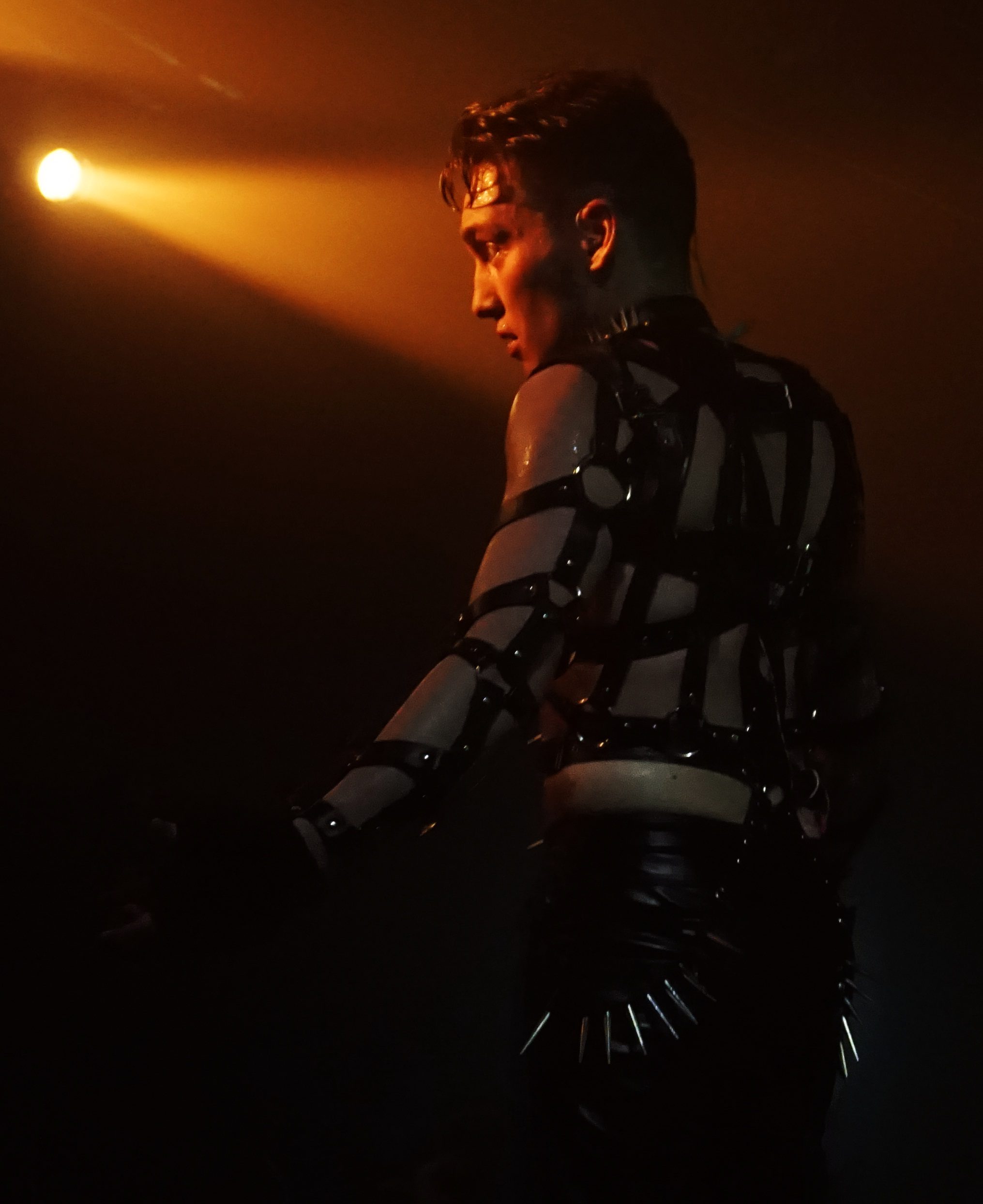
Matthías Haraldsson with Hatari at The Dome in Tufnell Park, London

Matthías Tryggvi Haraldsson (born 17 February 1994) is a former vocalist for the group and is the cousin of Klemens. He is the son of Gunnhildur Hauksdóttir, an artist, and Haraldur Flosi Tryggvason, the owner of LMB Mandat and brother of Klemens' mother, Rán. Outside of Hatari, Matthías is a playwright; he graduated from the Iceland University of the Arts with a one-man play entitled Griðastaður (transl. Sanctuary), which was later shown at the Tjarnarbíó theatre in Reykjavík. Matthías subsequently won the "Newcomer of the Year" award at the Grímuverðlaunin 2019. He also acted as a news reporter for Icelandic broadcaster RÚV. He married Brynhildur Karlsdóttir on 19 August 2023. They have 2 daughters. He announced his departure from the group in March 2023.

=== Contributors ===
Contributors for Hatari include Sólbjört Sigurðardóttir, Sigurður Andrean Sigurgeirsson, Ástrós Guðjónsdóttir, Ronja Mogensen and Birta Ásmundsdóttir, all of whom are considered part of Hatari. All five act as choreographers and dancers for the group, while Sólbjört and Ástrós also provide backing vocals. Sólbjört first joined the group as a dancer in 2016, acting alongside Ronja, who had previously done the group's make-up. The backing line-up changed several times; the line-up with Sólbjört, Andrean and Ástrós was arranged by Sólbjört in the preparations for Söngvakeppnin 2019. Andri Hrafn Unnarsson and Karen Briem are costume designers for Hatari, and Ingi Kristján Sigurmarsson acts as their graphic artist. In 2022, Íris Tanja Flygenring joined Hatari as a touring dancer, filling in for Ástrós who could not participate in the tour due to pregnancy, while Andrean did not participate in the tour for personal reasons.

== Discography ==
=== Albums ===
Title	Details
Neyslutrans	Released: 17 January 2020; Label: Svikamylla ehf.; Format: CD, LP, digital download

=== Extended plays ===
Title	Details
Neysluvara	Released: 31 October 2017; Label: Svikamylla ehf.; Format: CD, digital download

=== Remix albums ===
Title	Details
Neyslutrans Remixed	Released: 19 February 2021; Label: Svikamylla ehf.; Format: Digital download

=== Singles ===
Title	Year	Peak chart positions		Album
Title	Year	SCO	UK Down.	Album
"Spillingardans"	2019	—	—	Neyslutrans
"Hatrið mun sigra"	2019	92	85	Neyslutrans
"Klefi / Samed" (featuring Bashar Murad)	2019	—	—	Neyslutrans
"Klámstrákur"	2019	—	—	Neyslutrans
"Dansið eða deyið"	2022	—	—	Non-album singles
"Breadcrumbs"	2024	—	—	Non-album singles
"Quantity Control"	2025	—	—	Non-album singles
"MORE"	2025	—	—	Non-album singles
"Fuck You Look Good"	2026	—	—	Non-album singles
"—" denotes a release that did not chart or was not released in that territory.

== Awards and nominations ==
Year	Award	Category	Recipient	Result	Ref.
2017	Grapevine Music Awards 2017	Best Live Performance	Hatari	Won	
2018	Grapevine Music Awards 2018	Best Live Performance	Hatari	Won	
2018	Icelandic Music Awards	Song of the Year – Rock	"Spillingardans"	Nominated	
2018	Icelandic Music Awards	Performer of the Year	Hatari	Won	
2020	Grapevine Music Awards 2020	Singer of the Year, Male	Klemens Hannigan	Nominated	
2020	Grapevine Music Awards 2020	Song of the Year	"Hatrið mun sigra"	Won	
2020	Grapevine Music Awards 2020	Lyricist of the Year	Hatari	Nominated	
2020	Grapevine Music Awards 2020	Composer of the Year	Hatari	Nominated	
2020	Grapevine Music Awards 2020	Musical Event of the Year	Hatari at Eurovision	Nominated	

Preceded by Ari Ólafsson with "Our Choice"	Iceland in the Eurovision Song Contest; 2019	Succeeded by Daði & Gagnamagnið with "Think About Things"
