= Eyjaa =

Danish-Icelandic music duo

- Origin: Iceland and Denmark
- Genres: Pop; country
- Years active: 2021–present
- Members: Brynja Mary Sverrisdóttir; Sara Victoria Sverrisdóttir

Eyjaa (stylised in all caps) are a Danish-Icelandic duo consisting of sisters Brynja Mary and Sara Victoria Sverrisdóttir.

== History ==
=== Early life ===
Brynja Mary and Sara Victoria grew up in a family of eight siblings. In an interview, they said that they have lived in six countries and speak five languages, because when they were young, they moved to other countries repeatedly.

=== Musical career ===
Both of the sisters played music since they were young, they sang and played on both guitar on piano when they were just children. The two sisters describe their music sound as "Light, modern pop - with a clear Nordic feel". The older sister, Brynja Mary, previously participated in the Icelandic selection for Eurovision 2020, Söngvakeppnin 2020, but failed to qualify to the final.

In 2017 Sara Victoria Competed in Voice Junior, and sang the song A Thousand Years by Christina Perri.

In February 2021, they released their debut single "Don't Forget About Me", which peaked at number 2 in the Danish radio charts. In October of the same year, they released their second single, titled "The Wrecking Crew", this song reached number 11 in the radio charts.

In 2022, the duo released three more singles. The first of the three was called "Ultraviolet", the second, "Big Feelings" (which peaked at number 10 in the Danish radio charts), and the third was entitled "10".

On 19 January 2023, it was announced that the duo will participate in Dansk Melodi Grand Prix 2023, the Danish national selection for the Eurovision Song Contest 2023 with the song "I Was Gonna Marry Him". In the competition, the song didn't make it to the superfinal, meaning that they were out of the Top 3. Many viewers complained that there was a malfunction during the voting in the show, where it showed the same voting number for Eyjaa (who performed second) as the first performer, Frederik Leopold, so they couldn't vote for Eyjaa. The organizer of the competition, Erik Sturve Hansen, claimed that the error didn't affect the results of the competition.

== Discography ==
=== Singles ===
- 2021 – "Don't Forget About Me"
- 2021 – "The Wrecking Crew"
- 2022 – "Ultraviolet"
- 2022 – "Big Feelings"
- 2022 – "10"
- 2023 – "I Was Gonna Marry Him"
- 2023 – "Summer Hungover"
- 2024 – "Should've Loved Me Better"

== Externtal links ==
- Eyjaa at AllMusic
