= Ásdís (singer) =

Icelandic singer and songwriter (born 1993)

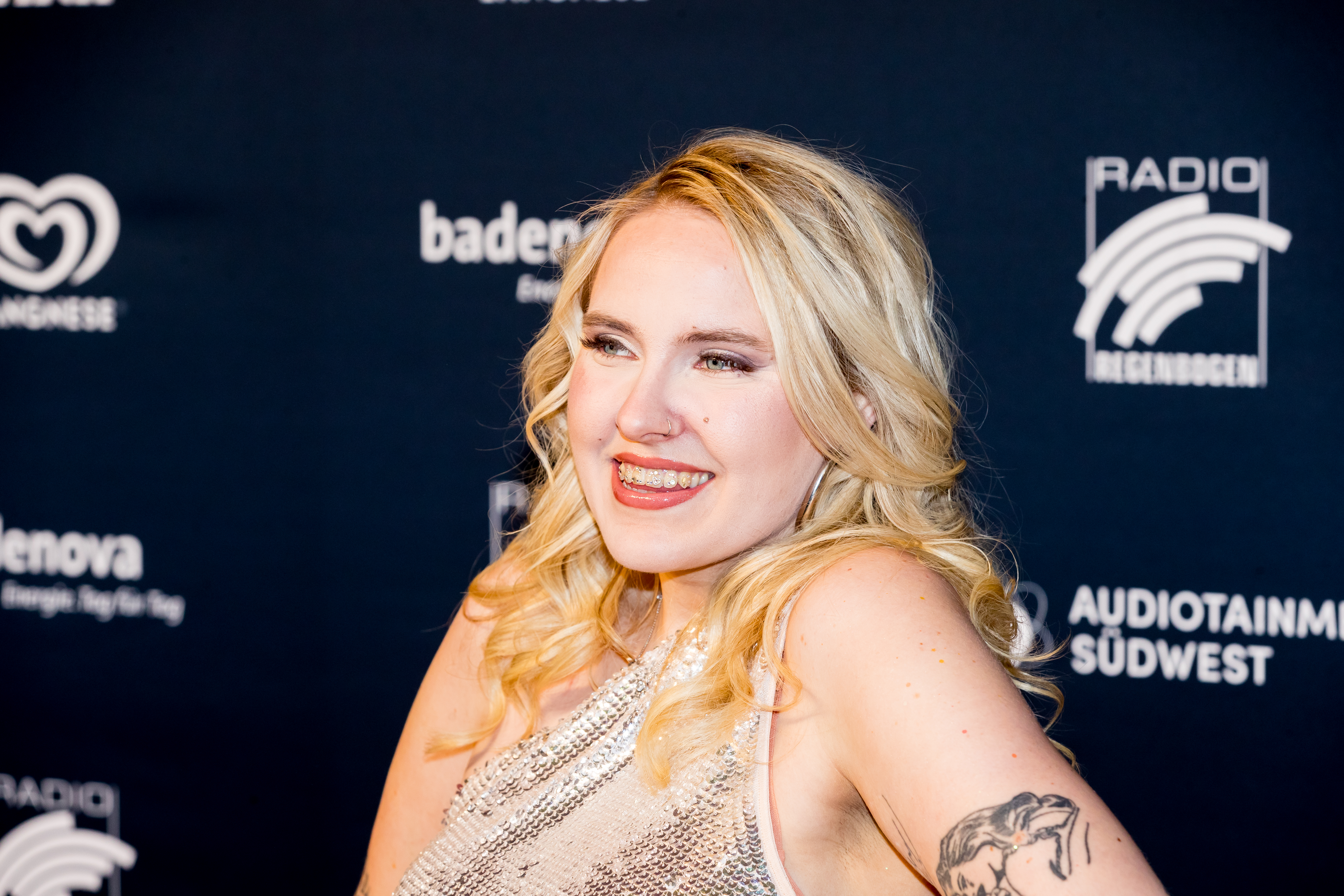
- Ásdís in 2024

Background information
- Born: Ásdís María Viðarsdóttir; 24 August 1993 (age 33); Reykjavík, Iceland
- Genres: Pop
- Occupations: Singer, songwriter
- Instrument: Vocals

Ásdís María Viðarsdóttir (born 24 August 1993), known mononymously as Ásdís, is an Icelandic singer and songwriter.

== Biography ==
Ásdís comes from the Icelandic capital Reykjavík. In 2014, she took part in the Eurovision Song Contest preliminary round Söngvakeppnin 2014 with the song "Amor". She managed to proceed from the semi-finals to the finals, held on 15 February 2014, but did not qualify to the superfinal.

Since 2020, Ásdís has been releasing her music via Spotify and Instagram, among others. In 2021, Budde Music announced that it had signed the Icelandic artist. The first success was the song "Worth It" together with Gromee, which reached number 1 in the Polish airplay charts. "Feel the Love" was also successful together with the Icelandic Eurovision Song Contest candidate Daði Freyr, whose video was released on 1 January 2021. Ásdís was already featured on Daði's album & Co (2019) and has been friends with him for a long time. The single "Release" with DJ and record producer 220 Kid was released on 22 April 2022. "Dirty Dancing" was released on 20 June 2022, on which she collaborated with the German house project Glockenbach. The song reached number 24 in the German charts.

Ásdís released her debut solo single "Angel Eyes" on 23 June 2023 by Universal Music.

She is one of the songwriters of the Icelandic entry for the Eurovision Song Contest 2024 "Scared of Heights", performed by Hera Björk.

== Personal life ==
Ásdís has lived in Berlin for several years and is a member of the queer community there.

== Discography ==
=== Singles ===
==== As lead artist ====
Title	Year	Peak chart positions							Certifications	Album or EP
Title	Year	ICE	BEL (Fl)	BEL (Wa)	GER	HUN Air.	POL Air.	SLO Air.	Certifications	Album or EP
"Feel the Love" (with Daði Freyr)	2021	18	—	—	—	—	—	—	—N/a	Welcome
"Release" (with 220 Kid)	2022	—	—	—	—	—	—	—	—N/a	Non-album singles
"Gravity" (with twocolors)	2023	—	—	—	—	—	—	—	—N/a	Non-album singles
"Angel Eyes"	2023	—	—	—	— (Note: "Angel Eyes" did not appear on the official German Singles Chart, but peaked at number one on the German Airplay Chart.)	—	—	—	—N/a	Non-album singles
"Beat of Your Heart" (with Purple Disco Machine)	2024	—	11	24	50	2	8	—	MAHASZ: Platinum; ZPAV: Gold	Non-album singles
"Flashback"	2024	—	—	—	— (Note: "Flashback" did not appear on the official German Singles Chart, but peaked at number two on the German Airplay Chart.)	—	—	—	—N/a	Non-album singles
"Touch Me"	2024	25	—	—	— (Note: "Touch Me" did not appear on the official German Singles Chart, but peaked at number one on the German Airplay Chart.)	—	53	16	—N/a	Non-album singles
"Pick Up"	2025	—	—	—	— (Note: "Pick Up" did not appear on the official German Singles Chart, but peaked at number four on the German Airplay Chart.)	—	—	—	—N/a	Non-album singles
"Half of My Heart" (with Michael Schulte)	2025	—	—	—	— (Note: "Half of My Heart" did not appear on the official German Singles Chart, but peaked at number five on the German Airplay Chart.)	—	—	—	—N/a	Non-album singles
"Electrified"	2025	—	—	—	— (Note: "Electrified" did not appear on the official German Singles Chart, but peaked at number seven on the German Airplay Chart.)	—	—	—	—N/a	Non-album singles
"The Art of Letting Go"	2026	—	—	—	— (Note: "The Art of Letting Go" did not appear on the official German Singles Chart, but peaked at number 93 on the German Airplay Chart.)	—	—	—	—N/a	Non-album singles
"—" denotes a recording that did not chart or was not released in that territory.

==== As featured artist ====
Title	Year	Peak chart positions				Certifications	Album or EP
Title	Year	AUT	GER	POL Air.	SWI	Certifications	Album or EP
"Worth It" (Gromee featuring Ásdís)	2020	—	—	1	—	ZPAV: Gold	Tiny Sparks
"Only Wanna Dance With You" (Zac Tenenbaum featuring Ásdís)	2020	—	—	—	—	—N/a	Non-album singles
"DNGRS" (Besomorph featuring Ásdís)	2020	—	—	—	—	—N/a	Non-album singles
"Stories" (Say Say featuring Ásdís)	2021	—	—	—	—	—N/a	Non-album singles
"Dirty Dancing" (Glockenbach featuring Ásdís)	2022	32	24	—	79	BVMI: Gold; IFPI SWI: Gold	Non-album singles
"Wow" (Toby Romeo, Keanu Silva, and Izko featuring Ásdís)	2022	—	—	—	—	—N/a	Non-album singles
"Smells Like Summer" (Tokio Hotel featuring Ásdís)	2022	—	—	—	—	—N/a	2001
"Not Even Love" (Seven Lions and Illenium featuring Ásdís)	2024	—	—	—	—	—N/a	Non-album single
"—" denotes a recording that did not chart or was not released in that territory.
