= 10 Years (song) =

2021 song by Daði og Gagnamagnið

Single by Daði og Gagnamagnið

from the EP Welcome
- Released: 13 March 2021
- Length: 2:46
- Label: Samlist; AWAL
- Songwriter(s): Daði Freyr Pétursson

Daði og Gagnamagnið singles chronology
"Feel the Love" (2021)	"10 Years" (2021)	"Somebody Else Now" (2021)

Eurovision Song Contest 2021 entry
- Country: Iceland
- Artist(s): Daði og Gagnamagnið
- Composer(s): Daði Freyr Pétursson
- Lyricist(s): Daði Freyr Pétursson

Finals performance
- Semi-final result: 2nd
- Semi-final points: 288
- Final result: 4th
- Final points: 378

Entry chronology
- ◄ "Think About Things" (2020)
- "Með hækkandi sól" (2022) ►

Music video
- "10 Years" on YouTube

"10 Years" is a song by Icelandic singer Daði Freyr and his band Gagnamagnið, released on 13 March 2021. The song represented Iceland in the Eurovision Song Contest 2021 in Rotterdam, the Netherlands.

== Music video ==
The music video for "10 Years" was released on Daði Freyr's YouTube channel on 29 March 2021, and was directed and produced by Guðný Rós Þórhallsdóttir. The music video begins with Daði watching "Think About Things" in his room when suddenly, the Mayor of Iceland, played by Ólafur Darri Ólafsson, calls Daði for help. He says that a new monster has emerged in Iceland is heading towards Reykjavík, and they have done all they can to stop it, to no avail. He goes on to say that the only hope to stop the monster now is Daði's "sweet, sweet dance moves" and to gather up the rest of the Gagnamagnið. Daði agrees to help, and sounds a siren.

Meanwhile, the Gagnamagnið are all together, playing video games (a game made by Daði himself, Daði and Gagnamagnið: Think About Aliens!) and are cleaning up the room when the alarm sounds. The screen goes to black, and 10 Years starts to play. Daði runs to the room where the Gagnamagnið where they rush to devise a plan to defeat the monster. The group dress up for battle, instruments and all, and fly to the monster with jetskis. When they arrive, the monster is shown to be destroying houses in the area. Daði is now faced with the monster, and is nervous. They do the 10 Years dance to gather up energy. Once done, they fire a laser, but it backfires as the monster uses the energy to fire it back at the group. The group survives by Daði's shield, and flee. Meanwhile, the monster decides to destroy a farm. The group head to a secluded place in the mountains, and team up to create a robot to defeat the monster. The group once again performs the 10 Years dance, to finally defeat the monster. The credits show the monster dancing in the mountains.

== Eurovision Song Contest ==
=== Internal selection ===
On 23 October 2020, RÚV confirmed that Daði og Gagnamagnið would represent Iceland in the 2021 contest. The song, entitled "10 Years", was released on 13 March 2021.

=== At Eurovision ===
The 65th edition of the Eurovision Song Contest took place in Rotterdam, the Netherlands and consisted of two semi-finals on 18 May and 20 May 2021, and the grand final on 22 May 2021. According to the Eurovision rules, all participating countries, except the host nation and the "Big Five", consisting of France, Germany, Italy, Spain and the United Kingdom, are required to qualify from one of two semi-finals to compete for the final, although the top 10 countries from the respective semi-final progress to the grand final. On 17 November 2020, it was announced that Iceland would be performing in the first half of the second semi-final of the contest.

On 20 May 2021, the entry qualified to participate in the grand final, having placed in the top 10 in the second semi-final. On 22 May they finished in 4th place in the final.

== Charts ==
Chart performance for "10 Years"
Chart (2021)	Peak position
Belgium (Ultratip Bubbling Under Flanders)	6
Finland (Suomen virallinen lista)	8
Greece (IFPI)	33
Iceland (Tónlistinn)	1
Ireland (IRMA)	38
Lithuania (AGATA)	11
Netherlands (Single Top 100)	15
Norway (VG-lista)	33
Sweden (Sverigetopplistan)	23
Switzerland (Schweizer Hitparade)	80
UK Singles (OCC)	43
UK Indie (OCC)	5
