= Dimma (band) =

Icelandic rock/metal band

Dimma is an Icelandic rock / metal band based in Reykjavík that has released six studio albums.

== Members ==
The band is currently made up of two members, brothers and founders of the band Ingó and Silli Geirdal.

- Ingó Geirdal – Guitar
- Silli Geirdal – Bass

=== Former members ===
- Stefán Jakobsson – Vocals
- Hjalti Ómar Ágústsson – Vocals
- Birgir Jónsson – Drums
- Egill Örn Rafnsson – Drums

== Discography ==
=== Albums ===
- 2005: Dimma
- 2008: Stigmata
- 2012: Myrkraverk
- 2014: Vélráð
- 2017: Eldraunir
- 2021: Þögn

Live albums

- 2013: Myrkraverk í Hörpu
- 2015: "Guði gleymdir"

=== Singles ===
- 2014: "Ljósbrá"
- 2014: "Vélráð"
- 2014: "Ég brenn"
