= Feel the Love (Daði Freyr and Ásdís song) =

Single by Daði Freyr and Ásdís

from the EP Welcome
- Released: 1 January 2021
- Genre: Pop
- Label: AWAL
- Songwriters: Daði Freyr Pétursson; Ásdís María Viðarsdóttir; Marcus Brosch; Jonas Shandel

Daði Freyr singles chronology
"Every Moment Is Christmas with You" (2020)	"Feel the Love" (2021)	"10 Years" (2021)

Ásdís singles chronology
"Worth It" (2020)	"Feel the Love" (2021)	"Release" (2022)

Music video
- "Feel the Love" on YouTube

"Feel the Love" is a song by Icelandic singers Daði Freyr and Ásdís. It was released on January 1, 2021, through Awal Recordings. The song was written by Freyr, Ásdís, Jonas Shandel and Marcus Brosch, with production handled by the aforementioned artists.

== Critical reception ==
The piece described, among others Will Richards from NME website. Andy Wors of the Nordic Music Review called "Feel the Love" "a heart-warming song".

== Credits and personnel ==
Credits adapted from Tidal.

- Daði Freyr Pétursson – production, songwriting, composition
- Ásdís María Viðarsdóttir – songwriting, composition
- Marcus Brosch – songwriting, composition
- Jonas Shandel – songwriting, composition

== Charts ==
Chart performance for "Feel the Love"
Chart (2021)	Peak position
Iceland (Tónlistinn)	18

== Release history ==
Release dates and formats for "Feel the Love"
Region	Date	Format(s)	Version	Label(s)	Ref.
Various	January 1, 2021	Digital download; streaming	Original	AWAL	
