= Think About Things =

2020 single by Daði Freyr

Single by Daði & Gagnamagnið

from the EP Welcome
- Released: 10 January 2020
- Length: 2:53
- Label: AWAL
- Songwriter: Daði Freyr Pétursson

Daði singles chronology
"Ég Er Að Fíla Mig (Langar Ekki Að Hvíla Mig)" (2019)	"Think About Things" (2020)	"Where We Wanna Be" (2020)

Eurovision Song Contest 2020 entry
- Country: Iceland
- Artists: Daði & Gagnamagnið
- Language: English
- Composer: Daði Freyr Pétursson
- Lyricist: Daði Freyr Pétursson

Finals performance
- Semi-final result: Contest cancelled

Entry chronology
- ◄ "Hatrið mun sigra" (2019)
- "10 Years" (2021) ►

Music video
- "Think About Things" on YouTube

"Think About Things" is a song by Icelandic singer Daði Freyr and his band Gagnamagnið. The song was released on 10 January 2020 with the Icelandic title "Gagnamagnið" (lit. 'The datavolume'), the name of the band. It was selected to represent Iceland in the Eurovision Song Contest 2020 in Rotterdam, the Netherlands on 29 February 2020. The band planned to compete in Eurovision with the English version of their song. Prior to the cancellation of the contest, the song was considered one of the favourites to win. The song became a viral hit, receiving acclaim by multiple international celebrities.

The song won Der kleine Song Contest, Sveriges 12:a, ESC: Norge bestemmer and Eurovision 2020: Big Night In!, the Austrian, Swedish, Norwegian and Australian alternative versions of the Eurovision Song Contest 2020 respectively.

== Background and composition ==
The song has two different-language versions – one in Icelandic ("Gagnamagnið"; released 10 January 2020) and one in English ("Think About Things"). The meanings of the two versions' lyrics differ. In an interview, Daði stated that the Icelandic version's lyrics "talk about Gagnamagnið (the fictional band we perform as in Söngvakeppnin) coming from the future and outer space to save the world with their brand new dance".

The band intended to compete in Eurovision with the English version of their song. Daði has stated that he considers the English-language lyrics to be "the real version of the song". Daði has described how the English lyrics of the song are about his infant daughter:

The lyrics in Think About Things are some of the most personal I have written. The song is about my little girl who was born in April of last year. I am talking about the feeling you get in the first few days and weeks where you know that you love this person with all your heart even though you don’t really get that much interaction. In the start she doesn’t do so much, so I am very excited to know what she thinks about all kinds of things. Now she is almost 10 months and has become such a character so the lyrics don’t really apply as much anymore, she is starting to let us know what she is thinking.

== Music video and promotion ==
The music video of the English version of the song was released on 14 February 2020. Daði has stated that the "nerdy aesthetic" of Gagnamagnið originated from the fake instruments made from computer parts, which were in turn inspired by The Brett Domino Trio. The dancing during the chorus was inspired by the video for "Skibidi" by Russian rave band Little Big, who were also set to compete in that year's Eurovision with their song Uno.

After Daði's Söngvakeppnin victory, many people uploaded clips on social media in which they danced to the song. This phenomenon started after a 'quarantine video' featuring the song, posted on Twitter, went viral, earning 348,200 likes and 7.9 million views (as of 10 June 2020). The song received critical acclaim of several international celebrities, and some of them, including Jennifer Garner and San Antonio Spurs mascot Coyote, uploaded their own dance videos to the song on social media platforms. On the day prior to the broadcast of Eurovision: Europe Shine a Light, a replacement show for the cancelled Eurovision Song Contest, Daði uploaded a fan video of Think About Things, featuring many of those clips, on YouTube. During Europe Shine A Light, he told that the response to his song was "overwhelming".

== Eurovision Song Contest ==
The song was scheduled to represent Iceland in the Eurovision Song Contest 2020, after Daði & Gagnamagnið was selected through Söngvakeppnin 2020, the music competition that selects Iceland's entries for the Eurovision Song Contest. On 28 January 2020, a special allocation draw was held which placed each country into one of the two semi-finals, as well as which half of the show they would perform in. Iceland was placed into the second semi-final, to be held on 14 May 2020, and was scheduled to perform in the first half of the show.

== Charts ==
The song reached number 34 on the UK Singles Chart, making it the first Eurovision entry to reach the Top 40 in UK since "Heroes" by Måns Zelmerlöw in 2015.

=== Weekly charts ===
Chart performance for "Think About Things"
Chart (2020–2021)	Peak position
Belgium (Ultratip Bubbling Under Flanders)	3
Iceland (Tónlistinn)	1
Ireland (IRMA)	3
Latvia Airplay (Radiomonitor)	17
Lithuania (AGATA)	72
Netherlands (Single Tip)	2
San Marino (SMRRTV Top 50)	48
Scotland Singles (OCC)	10
Sweden (Sverigetopplistan)	33
UK Singles (OCC)	34
UK Indie (OCC)	4

=== Year-end charts ===
Chart (2020)	Position
Ireland (IRMA)	47

== Certifications ==
Region	Certification	Certified units/sales
United Kingdom (BPI)	Gold	400,000^{‡}
^{‡} Sales+streaming figures based on certification alone.
