= Iva Marín Adrichem =

Dutch-Icelandic singer

Iva
- Born: Iva Marín Adrichem; 18 July 1998 (age 28); Reykjavík, Iceland
- Origin: Amsterdam, Netherlands
- Genres: Classical music; Operatic pop
- Occupations: Singer, songwriter
- Years active: 2011–present

Iva Marín Adrichem (born 18 July 1998), known simply as Iva, is a Dutch-Icelandic singer and songwriter.

== Career ==
=== Early career ===
In 2011, at the age of 13, Iva participated in the first edition of Jólastjarnan ("Christmas Star"), an Icelandic singing competition for children, broadcast by Stöð 2. She auditioned with the song "Je hebt een vriend" by the Belgian girl group K3, which she had translated to Icelandic as "Þú átt þér vin". In 2012, Iva had a role in the opera La bohème, staged by The Icelandic Opera in the concert hall Harpa in Reykjavík. She later also played in their production of Carmen. In 2015, she represented her school Hamrahlíð Junior College in the Söngkeppni framhaldsskólanna with the song "Lovin' You", originally by Minnie Riperton. In 2016, she was a contestant in the second season of The Voice Iceland. She auditioned with the song "Wuthering Heights" by Kate Bush, but did not advance to the next round.

=== 2020: Söngvakeppnin ===
In 2020, Iva was selected by the Icelandic broadcaster Ríkisútvarpið (RÚV) to participate in Söngvakeppnin, the national preselection for the Eurovision Song Contest 2020. She competed in the second semi-final on 15 February 2020 with the song "Oculis Videre" (Latin for "to see with the eyes"), and qualified for the final which took place on 29 February 2020 in the Laugardalshöll in Reykjavík. The song was performed in Icelandic in the semi-final and was initially going to be sung in English in the final, but it was later decided that the song would be kept in Icelandic. In the final, she received a total of 37,498 votes from the jury and televote, placing third out of five finalists.

== Personal life ==
Iva was born in Reykjavík, Iceland to a Dutch father and an Icelandic mother. She was born with a genetic eye disorder and is blind. Her Dutch family is originally from Ens in the province of Flevoland. She grew up in Amsterdam, but moved to Iceland when she was 9 years old. In 2018, Iva moved back to the Netherlands to study classical singing at the Codarts Conservatory in Rotterdam.

== Discography ==
=== Singles ===
Title	Year	Album
"Oculis Videre"	2020	Söngvakeppnin 2020
"Oculis Videre" (English version)	2020	Söngvakeppnin 2020
"Open & Free"	2020	Non-album singles
"Barn" (with Már Gunnarsson)	2020	Non-album singles
"To Reach You"	2020	Non-album singles
"Vinurinn vor" (with Már Gunnarsson)	2021	Non-album singles
