= Hatrið mun sigra =

2019 song by Hatari

Single by Hatari

from the album Neyslutrans
- Released: 1 February 2019
- Genre: Aggrotech
- Length: 2:59
- Label: Ríkisútvarpið
- Songwriters: Einar Hrafn Stefánsson; Klemens Nikulásson Hannigan; Matthías Tryggvi Haraldsson

Hatari singles chronology
"Spillingardans" (2018)	"Hatrið mun sigra" (2019)	"Klefi / صامد" (2019)

Music video
- "Hatrið mun sigra" on YouTube

Eurovision Song Contest 2019 entry
- Country: Iceland
- Artist: Hatari
- Language: Icelandic
- Composers: Einar Hrafn Stefánsson; Klemens Nikulásson Hannigan; Matthías Tryggvi Haraldsson
- Lyricists: Einar Hrafn Stefánsson; Klemens Nikulásson Hannigan; Matthías Tryggvi Haraldsson

Finals performance
- Semi-final result: 3rd
- Semi-final points: 221
- Final result: 10th
- Final points: 232

Entry chronology
- ◄ "Our Choice" (2018)
- "Think About Things" (2020) ►

"Hatrið mun sigra" (Icelandic: [ˈhaːtrɪð mʏːn ˈsɪɣra]; transl. "Hatred will prevail") is a song by Icelandic band Hatari. It won Söngvakeppnin 2019 and finished 10th at the Eurovision Song Contest 2019 in Tel Aviv, Israel. The song was the first Eurovision Song Contest entry to be performed in Icelandic since 2013. An extended version of the song is included in the band's debut studio album, Neyslutrans (2020).

== Eurovision Song Contest ==
The song was chosen to represent Iceland in the Eurovision Song Contest 2019 after Hatari was selected through Söngvakeppnin 2019, the national selection process organised by the Icelandic National Broadcasting Service. On 28 January 2019, a special allocation draw was held which placed each country into one of the two semi-finals, as well as which half of the show they would perform in. Iceland was placed into the first semi-final, to be held on 14 May 2019, and was scheduled to perform in the second half of the show. Once all the competing songs for the 2019 contest had been released, the running order for the semi-finals was decided by the show's producers rather than through another draw, so that similar songs were not placed next to each other. Iceland was set to perform in position 13. It was performed during the first semi-final on 14 May 2019, and qualified for the final, where it finished in 10th place with 232 points.

== Charts ==
Chart (2019)	Peak position
Iceland (Tónlistinn)	2
Lithuania (AGATA)	17
Scotland Singles (Official Charts)	92
UK Singles Downloads (Official Charts)	85
